= Great Neck Park District =

Park district in Nassau County, New York, United States

Coordinates: 40°48′15″N 73°44′12″W

- Seal of the Great Neck Park District

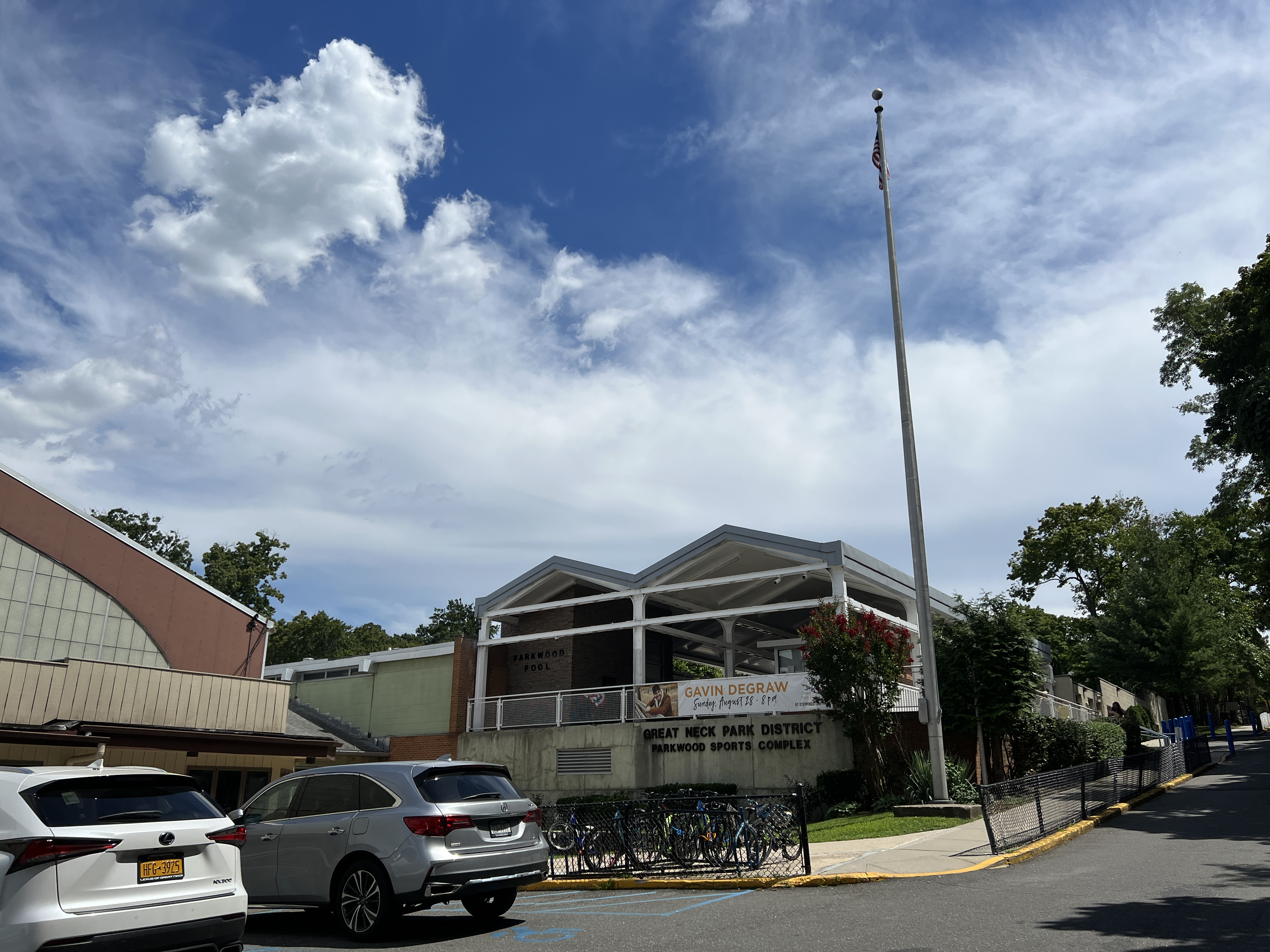
- The entrance to the Parkwood Pool & Sports Complex – one of the district's major facilities – in 2022

Park district overview
- Formed: August 14, 1916
- Status: Active
- Headquarters: 65 Arrandale Avenue, Great Neck, New York 11024
- Website: https://www.gnparks.org/

Map
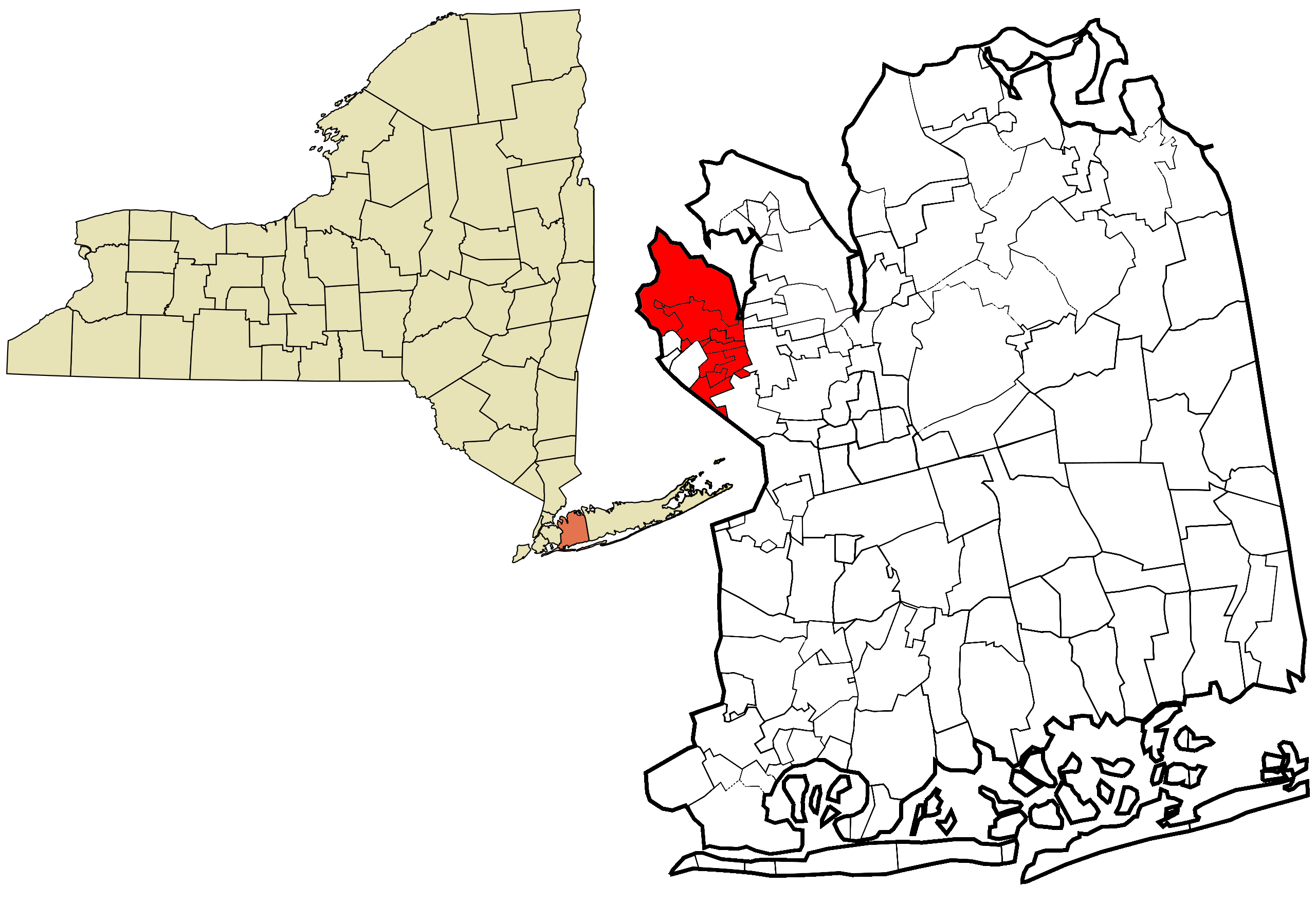
- Map of the Great Neck Park District, highlighted in red.

The Great Neck Park District (also known as Great Neck Parks and abbreviated as GNPD) is a park district serving much of the Great Neck Peninsula of Nassau County, on Long Island, New York, United States. It is the oldest park district in the State of New York and is headquartered a 65 Arrandale Avenue, in the Village of Great Neck.

== History ==
The Great Neck Park District was established on August 14, 1916, by Great Neck resident Roswell Eldridge. It was created only a few months after a law was passed by lawmakers in Albany allowing towns to establish park districts; the Great Neck Park District was the first such district of its type to be established anywhere in the State of New York.

In 1942, the Great Neck Park District gave some of its public beach in Kings Point to the United States government for the United States Merchant Marine Academy.

In 1973, the Town of North Hempstead gave approval for the Great Neck Park District to purchase Creek Park through a $270,000 (1973 USD) bond. The park, which has a total size of roughly 2.5 acres (1.0 ha), was purchased from a private developer and created a greenbelt connecting Cutter Mill Park and the Russell Gardens Park (the latter being owned by the Russell Gardens Association).

In 1977, community parents came together to construct an indoor play facility for children in an abandoned locker room at Steppingstone Park. The equipment installed during the project, which was hand-crafted, painted, and assembled by the locals, included a boat (named the USS Boat) and a rocket ship. Each room was painted by the locals with unique themes and murals related to that theme. The materials cost around $1,800 (1977 USD); parents volunteered with the assembly and painting of the playhouse facilities.

In the 1980s, the beach at Steppingstone Park reopened. It had been closed for over 30 years due to pollution in the Long Island Sound caused by sewage plants operated by the City of New York.

In the 2000s, the Great Neck Park District renovated Parkwood Pool. The renovations included creating a water park.

== Service area ==
The Great Neck Park District serves the following communities in Great Neck:

=== Incorporated villages ===
- Great Neck
- Great Neck Plaza
- Kensington
- Kings Point
- Russell Gardens
- Thomaston

=== Unincorporated hamlets ===
- Great Neck Gardens
- University Gardens

Additionally, the Great Neck Park District serves the area of Spinney Hill in Manhasset zoned for the Great Neck Union Free School District.

== District facilities ==
=== Parks ===
The Great Neck Park District operates the following parks and recreational facilities:

==== Major parks ====
- Allenwood Park
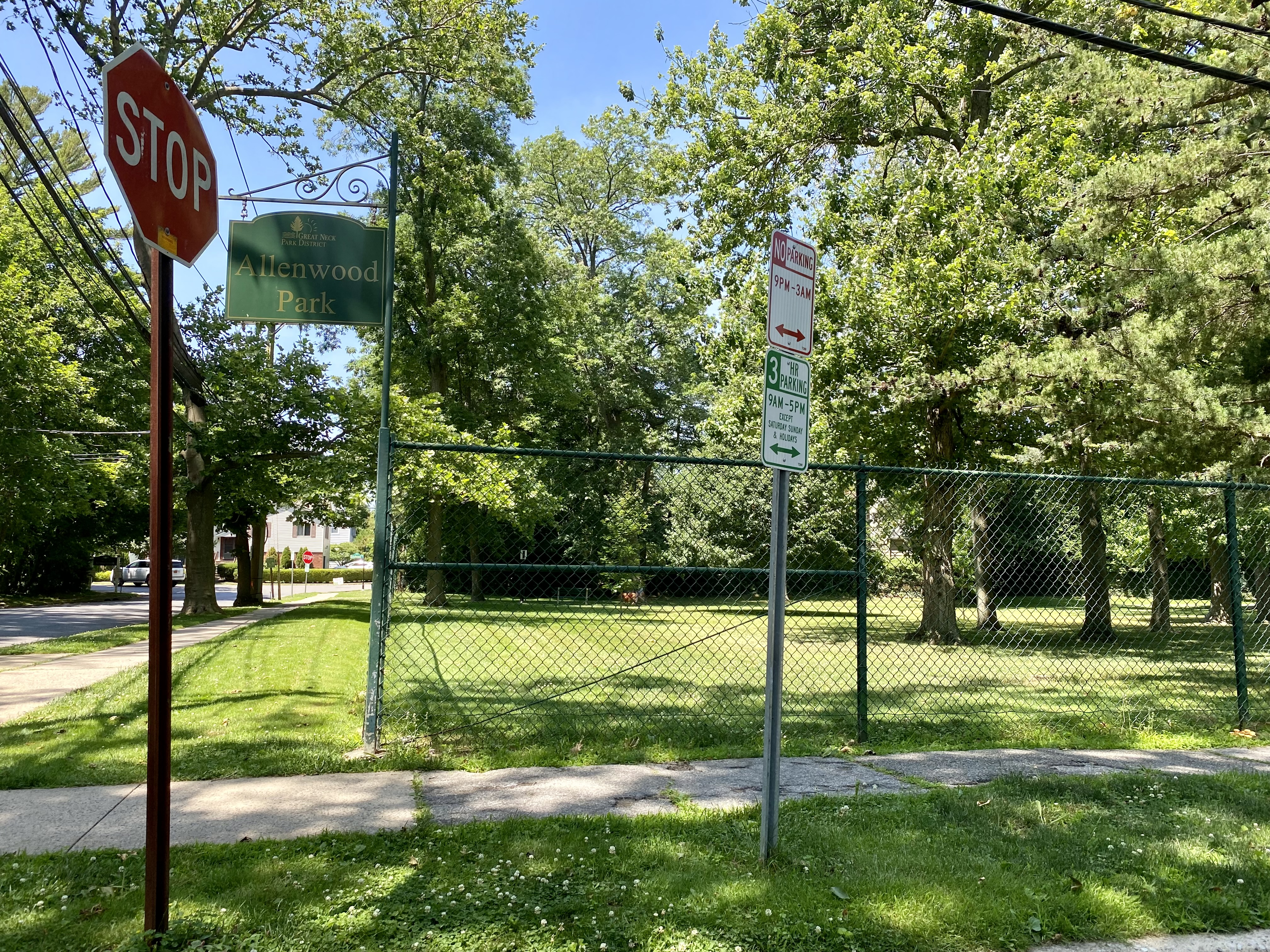
  Allenwood Park from the street on June 28, 2021.
- Kings Point Park
- Memorial Field
- Parkwood Pool & Sports Complex
- Steppingstone Park & Marina
- Village Green & Rose Garden

==== Neighborhood parks ====
- Cutter Mill Park
- Firefighters Park
- Lakeville Park
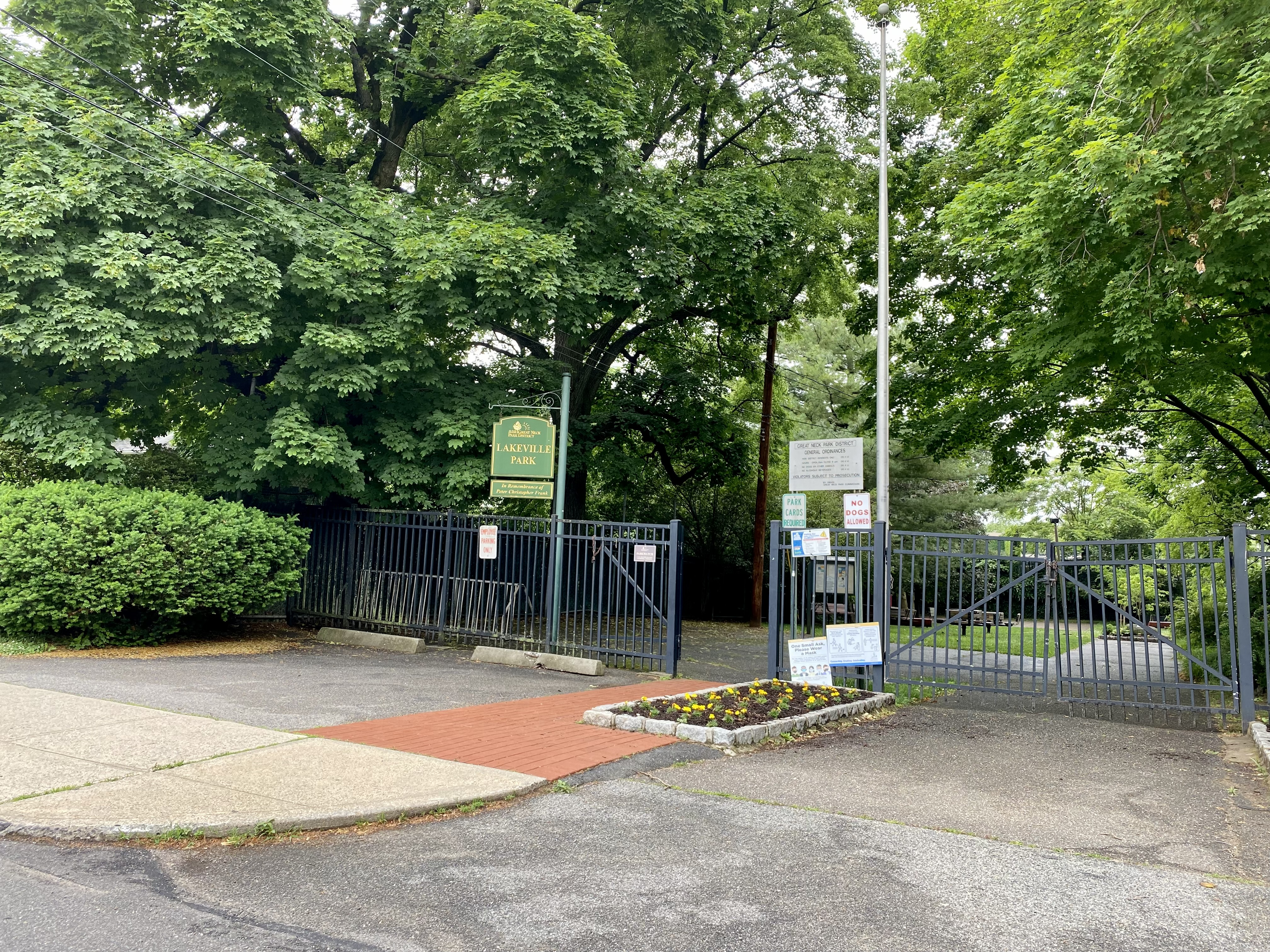
  The entrance to Lakeville Park on June 4, 2021.
- Manor Park
- Ravine Park
- Thomaston Park
- Upland Park
- Wyngate Park

==== Passive parks ====
- Creek Park (Daniel Jay Berg Memorial Park)
- Udalls Pond Park
- Woodland Preserve
- Wooleys Lane Park

==== Dog park ====
The Great Neck Park District operates a dog park on Colonial Road.

=== Commuter parking fields ===
The Great Neck Park District operates the following commuter parking fields serving the Long Island Rail Road's Great Neck station:

- Canterbury Road Lot
- North Station Plaza Lot
- Shoreward Drive

=== Great Neck House ===
Additionally, the Great Neck Parks District operates the Great Neck House. This facility serves as a cultural venue, and often provides park district residents with activities such as movies and live performances.

== See also ==
- Belgrave Sewer District – Another special district serving much of the Great Neck area.
- Great Neck Water Pollution Control District – Another special district serving much of the Great Neck area.
- Manhasset Park District – Another park district on Long Island, in the adjacent area of Manhasset.
