= List of places in Nassau County, New York =

This is a list of places in Nassau County, New York. Nassau County, on Long Island, became a county in the U.S. state of New York in 1899 after separating from Queens County. Included in the list are two cities, three towns, 64 incorporated villages, and 63 unincorporated hamlets whose names are used for overlapping Census-designated places (CDPs). Also included in the list are five CDPs not generally included as hamlets, and three non-CDP hamlets (Strathmore, East Garden City and North Woodmere). The U.S. Postal Service has organized Nassau County into 111 different five-digit ZIP Codes served by 63 different post offices. Each post office has the same name as a city, hamlet or village, but the boundaries are seldom the same.

Name	Status	Population (2010 census)	Population (2020 census) (Note: The number of inhabitants for places with less than 5,000 inhabitants is not stated)	Year incorporated	Town
Glen Cove	city	26,964	28,365	1917	formerly Oyster Bay
Long Beach	city	33,275	35,029	1922	formerly Hempstead
Town of Hempstead	town	759,757	793,409	1644	
Town of North Hempstead	town	226,322	301,332	1784	formerly Hempstead
Town of Oyster Bay	town	293,214	237,639	1667	
Atlantic Beach	village	1,891	-	1962	Hempstead
Bellerose	village	1,193	-	1924	Hempstead
Cedarhurst	village	6,592	7,374	1910	Hempstead
East Rockaway	village	9,818	10,159	1910	Hempstead
Floral Park	village	15,863	16,172	1908	Hempstead, North Hempstead
Freeport	village	43,713	44,472	1892	Hempstead
Garden City	village	22,371	23,272	1919	Hempstead, North Hempstead
Hempstead	village	53,891	59,169	1853	Hempstead
Hewlett Bay Park	village	404	-	1928	Hempstead
Hewlett Harbor	village	1,263	-	1925	Hempstead
Hewlett Neck	village	445	-	1927	Hempstead
Island Park	village	4,655	-	1926	Hempstead
Lawrence	village	6,483	6,809	1897	Hempstead
Lynbrook	village	19,427	20,438	1911	Hempstead
Malverne	village	8,514	8,560	1921	Hempstead
Rockville Centre	village	24,023	26,016	1893	Hempstead
South Floral Park	village	1,764	-	1925	Hempstead
Stewart Manor	village	1,896	-	1927	Hempstead
Valley Stream	village	37,511	40,634	1925	Hempstead
Woodsburgh	village	778	-	1912	Hempstead
Baldwin	hamlet	24,033	33,919	-	Hempstead
Barnum Island	hamlet	2,414	-	-	Hempstead
Bay Park	hamlet	2,212	-	-	Hempstead
Bellerose Terrace	hamlet	2,198	-	-	Hempstead
Bellmore	hamlet	16,218	16,297	-	Hempstead
East Atlantic Beach	hamlet	2,049	-	-	Hempstead
East Meadow	hamlet	38,132	37,796	-	Hempstead
Elmont	hamlet	33,198	35,265	-	Hempstead
Franklin Square	hamlet	29,320	30,903	-	Hempstead
Garden City South	hamlet	4,024	-	-	Hempstead
Harbor Isle	hamlet	1,301	-	-	Hempstead
Hewlett	hamlet	6,819	7,262	-	Hempstead
Inwood	hamlet	9,792	11,340	-	Hempstead
Levittown	hamlet	51,881	51,758	-	Hempstead
Lido Beach	hamlet	2,897	-	-	Hempstead
Merrick	hamlet	20,130	22,040	-	Hempstead
North Bellmore	hamlet	19,941	20,583	-	Hempstead
North Merrick	hamlet	12,272	12,238	-	Hempstead
North Valley Stream	hamlet	16,628	18,197	-	Hempstead
Oceanside	hamlet	32,109	32,637	-	Hempstead
Point Lookout	hamlet	1,219	-	-	Hempstead
Roosevelt	hamlet	16,258	18,066	-	Hempstead
Salisbury	hamlet	12,093	12,618	-	Hempstead
Seaford	hamlet	15,294	15,251	-	Hempstead
South Hempstead	hamlet	3,243	-	-	Hempstead
South Valley Stream	hamlet	5,962	6,386	-	Hempstead
Uniondale	hamlet	24,759	32,473	-	Hempstead
Wantagh	hamlet	18,871	18,613	-	Hempstead
West Hempstead	hamlet	18,862	19,835	-	Hempstead
Woodmere	hamlet	17,554	18,669	-	Hempstead
East Garden City	non-CDP hamlet	6,208	-	-	Hempstead
North Woodmere	non-CDP hamlet	-	-	-	Hempstead
Baldwin Harbor	CDP	8,102	-	-	Hempstead
Lakeview	CDP	5,615	6,077	-	Hempstead
Malverne Park Oaks	CDP	505	-	-	Hempstead
North Lynbrook	CDP	793	-	-	Hempstead
North Wantagh	CDP	11,960	11,931	-	Hempstead
Strathmore	non-CDP hamlet	-	-	-	North Hempstead
Baxter Estates	village	999		1931	North Hempstead
East Hills	village	6,955	7,284	1931	North Hempstead, Oyster Bay
East Williston	village	2,556	-	1926	North Hempstead
Flower Hill	village	4,665	-	1931	North Hempstead
Great Neck	village	9,989	11,145	1922	North Hempstead
Great Neck Estates	village	2,761	-	1911	North Hempstead
Great Neck Plaza	village	6,707	7,482	1930	North Hempstead
Kensington	village	1,161	-	1921	North Hempstead
Kings Point	village	5,005	5,619	1924	North Hempstead
Lake Success	village	2,897	-	1927	North Hempstead
Manorhaven	village	6,556	6,956	1930	North Hempstead
Mineola	village	18,799	20,800	1906	North Hempstead, Hempstead
Munsey Park	village	2,693	-	1930	North Hempstead
New Hyde Park	village	9,712	10,257	1927	North Hempstead, Hempstead
North Hills	village	5,075	5,464	1929	North Hempstead
Old Westbury	village	4,671	-	1924	North Hempstead, Oyster Bay
Plandome	village	1,349	-	1911	North Hempstead
Plandome Heights	village	1,005	-	1929	North Hempstead
Plandome Manor	village	872	-	1931	North Hempstead
Port Washington North	village	3,154	-	1932	North Hempstead
Roslyn	village	2,770	-	1932	North Hempstead
Roslyn Estates	village	1,251	-	1931	North Hempstead
Roslyn Harbor	village	1,051	-	1931	North Hempstead, Oyster Bay
Russell Gardens	village	945	-	1931	North Hempstead
Saddle Rock	village	830	-	1911	North Hempstead
Sands Point	village	2,675	-	1910	North Hempstead
Thomaston	village	2,617	-	1931	North Hempstead
Westbury	village	15,404	15,864	1932	North Hempstead
Williston Park	village	7,287	7,591	1926	North Hempstead
Albertson	hamlet	5,182	5,220	-	North Hempstead
Carle Place	hamlet	4,981	5,005	-	North Hempstead
Garden City Park	hamlet	7,806	7,985	-	North Hempstead
Great Neck Gardens	hamlet	1,186	-	-	North Hempstead
Greenvale	hamlet	1,904	-	-	North Hempstead, Oyster Bay
Harbor Hills	hamlet	575	-	-	North Hempstead
Herricks	hamlet	4,295	-	-	North Hempstead
Manhasset	hamlet	8,080	8,176	-	North Hempstead
Manhasset Hills	hamlet	3,592	-	-	North Hempstead
New Cassel	hamlet	14,059	14,199	-	North Hempstead
North New Hyde Park	hamlet	14,899	15,657	-	North Hempstead
Port Washington	hamlet	15,846	16,753	-	North Hempstead
Roslyn Heights	hamlet	6,577	6,747	-	North Hempstead
Saddle Rock Estates	hamlet	466	-	-	North Hempstead
Searingtown	hamlet	4,915	5,044	-	North Hempstead
University Gardens	hamlet	4,226	-	-	North Hempstead
Bayville	village	6,669	6,748	1919	Oyster Bay
Brookville	village	3,465	-	1931	Oyster Bay
Centre Island	village	410	-	1926	Oyster Bay
Cove Neck	village	286	-	1927	Oyster Bay
Farmingdale	village	8,189	8,466	1904	Oyster Bay
Lattingtown	village	1,739	-	1931	Oyster Bay
Laurel Hollow	village	1,952	-	1926	Oyster Bay
Massapequa Park	village	17,008	17,109	1931	Oyster Bay
Matinecock	village	810	-	1928	Oyster Bay
Mill Neck	village	997	-	1925	Oyster Bay
Muttontown	village	3,497	-	1931	Oyster Bay
Old Brookville	village	2,134	6,403	1929	Oyster Bay
Oyster Bay Cove	village	2,197	-	1931	Oyster Bay
Sea Cliff	village	4,995	5,062	1883	Oyster Bay
Upper Brookville	village	1,698	-	1932	Oyster Bay
Bethpage	hamlet	16,429	16,658	-	Oyster Bay
East Massapequa	hamlet	19,069	19,854	-	Oyster Bay
East Norwich	hamlet	2,709	-	-	Oyster Bay
Glen Head	hamlet	4,697	-	-	Oyster Bay
Glenwood Landing	hamlet	3,779	-	-	Oyster Bay, North Hempsead
Hicksville	hamlet	41,547	43,869	-	Oyster Bay
Jericho	hamlet	13,567	14,808	-	Oyster Bay
Locust Valley	hamlet	3,406		-	Oyster Bay
Massapequa	hamlet	21,685	21,355	-	Oyster Bay
North Massapequa	hamlet	17,886	17,829	-	Oyster Bay
Old Bethpage	hamlet	5,523	-	-	Oyster Bay
Oyster Bay	hamlet	6,707	7,049	-	Oyster Bay
Plainedge	hamlet	8,817	9,517	-	Oyster Bay
Plainview	hamlet	26,217	27,100	-	Oyster Bay
South Farmingdale	hamlet	14,486	14,345	-	Oyster Bay
Syosset	hamlet	18,829	19,259	-	Oyster Bay
Woodbury	hamlet	8,907	9,335	-	Oyster Bay
