= University Gardens, New York =

- Hamlet and census-designated place
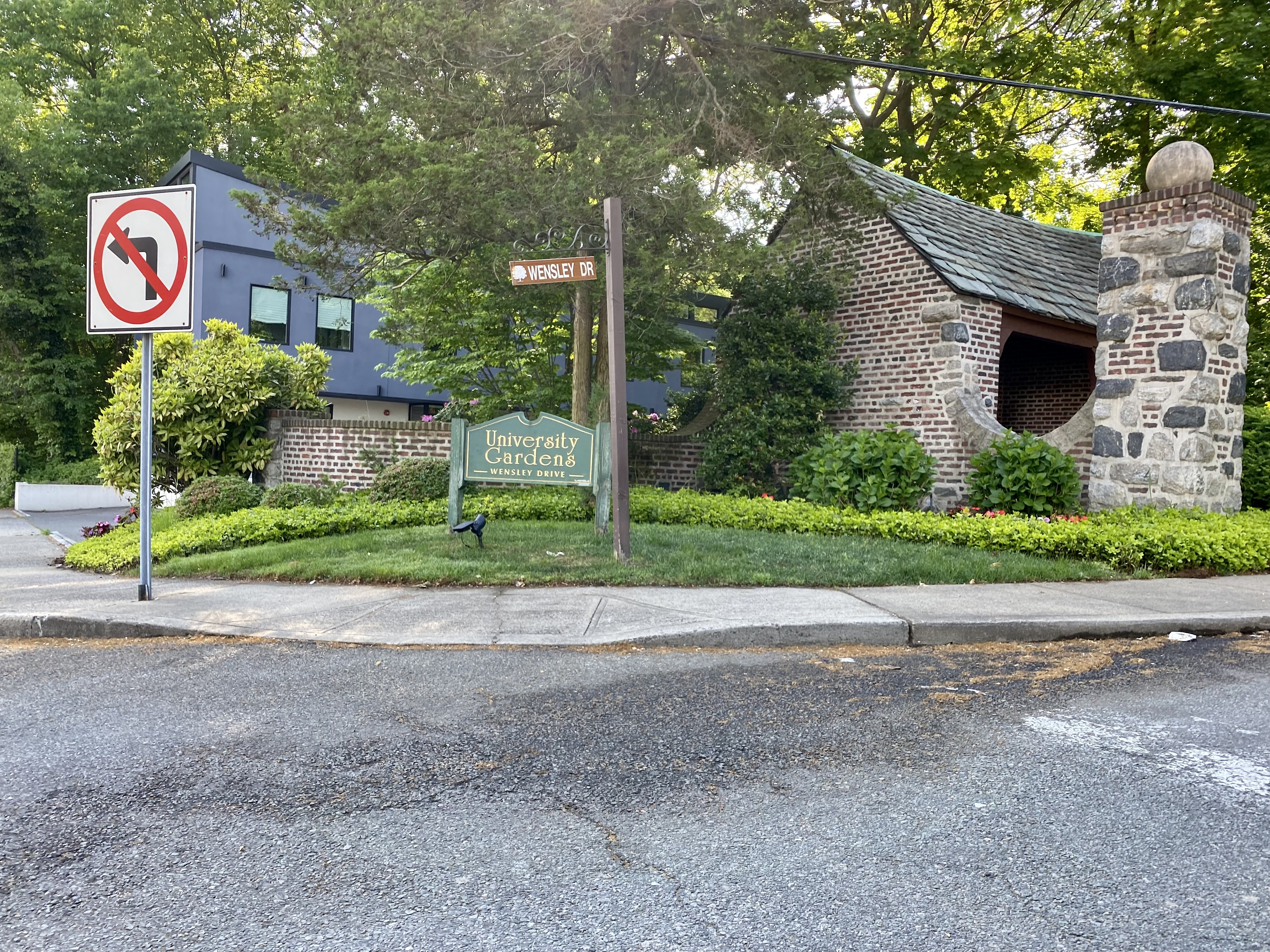
- The Wensley Drive entrance to the University Gardens subdivision for which the CDP is named, as seen on May 21, 2021.

- Location in Nassau County and the state of New York

- Location on Long Island Location within the state of New York
- Coordinates: 40°46′27″N 73°43′36″W
- Country: United States
- State: New York
- County: Nassau
- Town: North Hempstead
- Named for: The former University Golf Club and the adjacent village, Russell Gardens

Area
  - Total: 0.53 sq mi (1.38 km^{2})
  - Land: 0.53 sq mi (1.38 km^{2})
  - Water: 0 sq mi (0.00 km^{2})
- Elevation: 148 ft (45 m)

Population (2020)
  - Total: 4,358
  - Density: 8,206.2/sq mi (3,168.43/km^{2})
- Time zone: UTC−5 (Eastern (EST))
  - Summer (DST): UTC−4 (EDT)
- ZIP Codes: 11020, 11021 (Great Neck)
- Area codes: 516, 363
- FIPS code: 36-76287
- GNIS feature ID: 0968249

University Gardens (also known as Lakeville and Little Neck, Nassau County) is a hamlet and a census-designated place (CDP) in Nassau County, on the North Shore of Long Island, in New York, United States. It is located within the Town of North Hempstead and is part of the Greater Great Neck area. The population was 4,358 at the time of the 2020 census.

The University Gardens CDP includes the University Gardens subdivision and the other unincorporated areas between it and the Nassau / Queens line, such as Great Neck Terrace.

== History ==
Much of the land which is now located within the University Gardens CDP was once farmland. Suburban development in the community started to take off in the early 20th century. This includes development in and of the Little Neck Park, University Gardens, and Waverly Hills sections; at the time, the hamlet was known as Lakeville and Little Neck, Nassau County.

The University Gardens development (for which the hamlet and CDP is named) was developed in the late 1920s. It includes 218 homes and 17 commercial properties.

In the 1940s, large portions of the Waverly Hills section of the hamlet were developed with homes designed by architect H.C. Meyer.

In the 1950s, the 652-family Great Neck Terrace garden apartment complex within the hamlet was constructed. Located at the northwestern corner of the hamlet, the complex's 28 garden apartment buildings were designed by architect Samuel Paul.

=== Etymology ===
The name of the University Gardens CDP is taken from a planned community of the same name, which was constructed within the hamlet in the 1920s. The name reflects the fact that the land which that subdivision is located on was purchased from (and built atop) the short-lived University Golf Club – and because Russell Gardens, located across Northern Boulevard, was being developed around the same time. As such, the "University" part of its name comes from the golf club and the "Gardens" part of its name comes from Russell Gardens.

== Geography ==
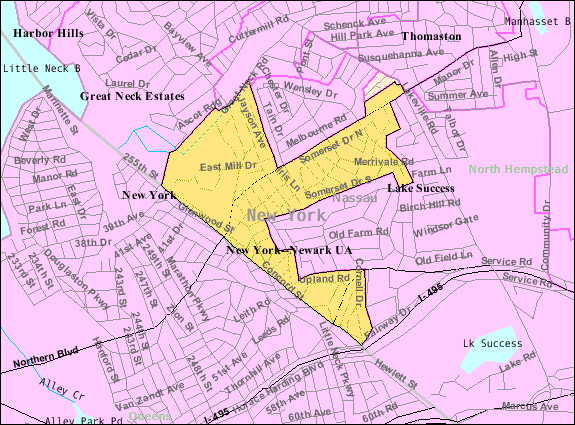
U.S. Census map of University Gardens.

According to the United States Census Bureau, the CDP has a total area of 0.6 square miles (1.6 km^{2}), all land.

== Demographics ==
Historical population
Census	Pop.	Note	%±
2000	4,138		—
2010	3,058		−26.1%
2020	4,358		42.5%
U.S. Decennial Census

=== 2020 census ===
As of the 2020 census, University Gardens had a population of 4,358. The median age was 45.9 years. 20.2% of residents were under the age of 18 and 19.7% of residents were 65 years of age or older. For every 100 females there were 89.7 males, and for every 100 females age 18 and over there were 84.0 males age 18 and over.

100.0% of residents lived in urban areas, while 0.0% lived in rural areas.

There were 1,642 households in University Gardens, of which 32.5% had children under the age of 18 living in them. Of all households, 57.7% were married-couple households, 11.8% were households with a male householder and no spouse or partner present, and 27.6% were households with a female householder and no spouse or partner present. About 25.6% of all households were made up of individuals and 12.0% had someone living alone who was 65 years of age or older.

There were 1,706 housing units, of which 3.8% were vacant. The homeowner vacancy rate was 1.1% and the rental vacancy rate was 4.3%.

Racial composition as of the 2020 census
Race	Number	Percent
White	1,764	40.5%
Black or African American	62	1.4%
American Indian and Alaska Native	0	0.0%
Asian	2,126	48.8%
Native Hawaiian and Other Pacific Islander	0	0.0%
Some other race	135	3.1%
Two or more races	271	6.2%
Hispanic or Latino (of any race)	323	7.4%

=== 2010 census ===
As of the 2010 census, there were 3,058 people, 1,559 households, and 1,106 families within the CDP. The racial makeup of the CDP was 76.7% White, 3.0% African American, 0.0% Native American, 20.0% Asian, 0.0% Native Hawaiian and Other Pacific Islander, 1.2% from other races, and 0.9% from two or more races. Hispanic or Latino of any race were 2.5% of the population.

=== 2000 census ===
As of the 2000 census, there were 4,138 people, 1,660 households, and 1,160 families residing in the CDP. The population density was 7,007.1 inhabitants per square mile (2,705.5/km^{2}). There were 1,696 housing units at an average density of 2,871.9 per square mile (1,108.8/km^{2}). The racial makeup of the CDP was 80.67% White, 2.39% African American, 0.12% Native American, 13.29% Asian, 1.98% from other races, and 1.55% from two or more races. Hispanic or Latino of any race were 7.59% of the population.

There were 1,660 households, out of which 31.2% had children under the age of 18 living with them, 58.6% were married couples living together, 8.8% had a female householder with no husband present, and 30.1% were non-families. 27.3% of all households were made up of individuals, and 9.0% had someone living alone who was 65 years of age or older. The average household size was 2.49 and the average family size was 3.06.

In the CDP, the population was spread out, with 22.7% under the age of 18, 5.3% from 18 to 24, 28.3% from 25 to 44, 28.3% from 45 to 64, and 15.3% who were 65 years of age or older. The median age was 42 years. For every 100 females, there were 88.9 males. For every 100 females age 18 and over, there were 86.6 males.

The median income for a household in the CDP was $74,637, and the median income for a family was $90,511. Males had a median income of $61,207 versus $42,308 for females. The per capita income for the CDP was $40,643. About 2.5% of families and 2.4% of the population were below the poverty line, including 3.1% of those under age 18 and 2.1% of those age 65 or over.

== Government ==
=== Town representation ===
As University Gardens is an unincorporated hamlet, it has no government of its own, and is instead governed directly by the Town of North Hempstead in Manhasset.

Lake Success is located in the Town of North Hempstead's 4th council district, which as of August 2024 is represented on the North Hempstead Town Council by Christine Liu (D–Herricks).

=== Representation in higher government ===
==== Nassau County representation ====
University Gardens is located in Nassau County's 10th Legislative district, which as of August 2024 is represented in the Nassau County Legislature by Mazi Melesa Pilip (R–Great Neck).

==== New York State representation ====
===== New York State Assembly =====
University Gardens is located in the New York State Assembly's 16th State Assembly district, which as of August 2024 is represented in the New York State Assembly by Gina L. Sillitti (D–Manorhaven).

===== New York State Senate =====
University Gardens is located in the New York State Senate's 7th State Senate district, which as of August 2024 is represented in the New York State Senate by Jack M. Martins (R–Old Westbury).

==== Federal representation ====
===== United States Congress =====
University Gardens is located entirely within New York's 3rd Congressional district, which as of August 2024 is represented in the United States Congress by Thomas R. Suozzi (D–Glen Cove).

===== United States Senate =====
Like the rest of New York, University Gardens is represented in the United States Senate by Charles Schumer (D) and Kirsten Gillibrand (D).

=== Politics ===
In the 2016 U.S. presidential election, the majority of University Gardens voters voted for Hillary Clinton (D).

== Parks and recreation ==
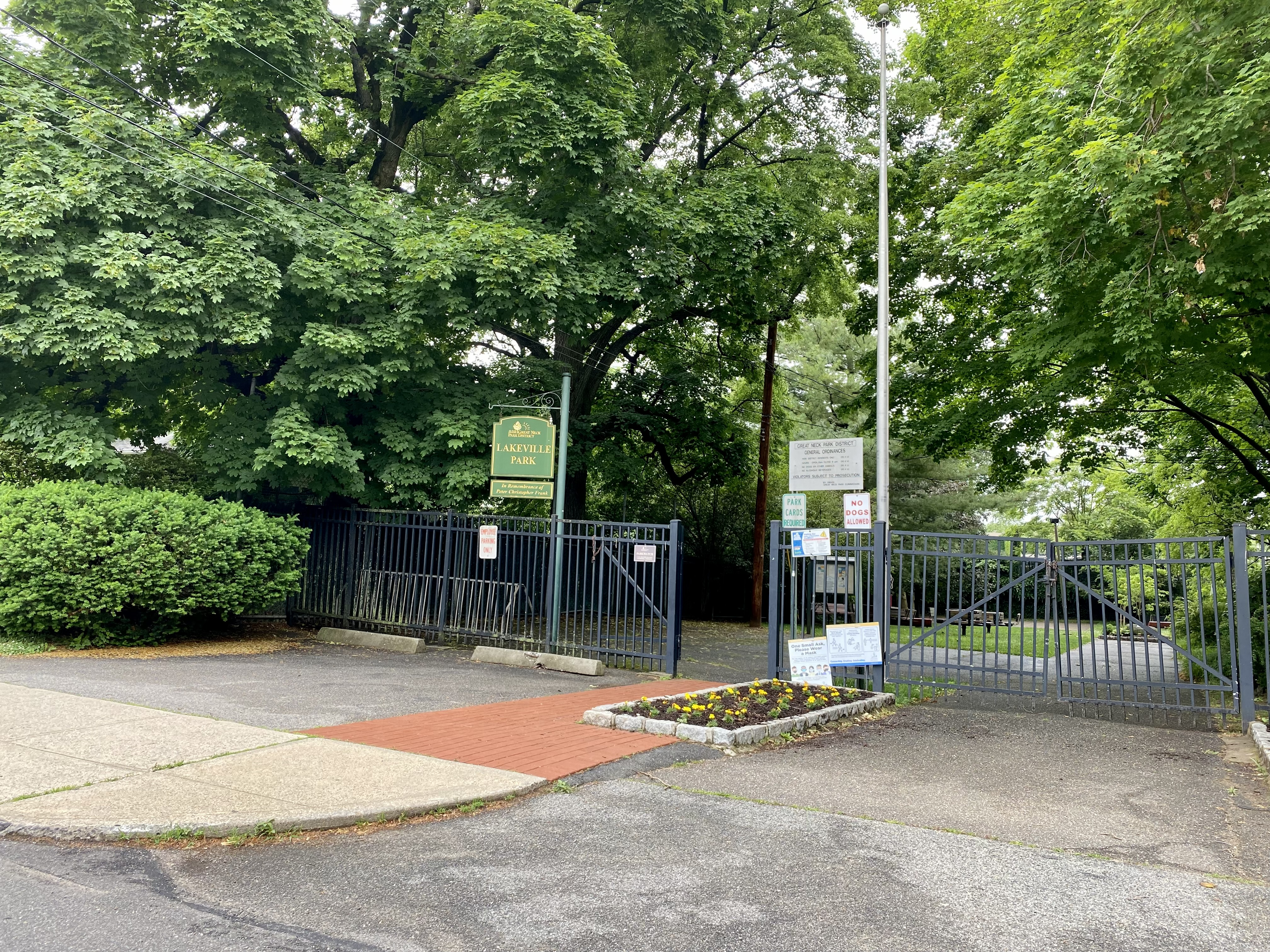
The entrance to Lakeville Park on June 4, 2021.

The Great Neck Park District, which the hamlet is entirely within the boundaries of, also maintains three parks within the hamlet: Cutter Mill Park (located off Great Neck Road), Lakeville Park (located at the northern end of Concord Avenue at Pembroke Avenue), and Upland Park (located on the east side of Soundview Drive between Bates and Upland Roads).

== Education ==
=== School district ===
University Gardens is located entirely within the boundaries of (and is thus served by) the Great Neck Union Free School District. As such, all children who reside within University Gardens and attend public schools go to Great Neck's schools.

==== School zones ====
For elementary education, the majority of University Gardens is zoned for Lakeville Elementary School – excepting the Great Neck Terrace section, which is zoned for Saddle Rock Elementary School. As such, all children who reside within University Gardens and attend Great Neck's elementary schools go to one of these two elementary schools, depending on where they reside within the hamlet.

For secondary education, the majority of University Gardens is zoned for Great Neck South Middle School and Great Neck South High School – excepting the Great Neck Terrace section, which is in the district's "Optional Zone"; students residing in this zone can choose whether to attend South Middle School & South High School or North Middle School & North High School for their secondary education.

=== Library district ===
University Gardens is located within the boundaries of the Great Neck Library District, which is served by the Great Neck Public Library.

Furthermore, the Lakeville Branch of the Great Neck Public Library is located within University Gardens, on Great Neck Road.

== Infrastructure ==
=== Transportation ===
==== Road ====
Northern Boulevard (New York State Route 25A) passes through the hamlet and forms part of its northern boundary.

Other major roads within the hamlet include Bates Road (CR C06), Concord Avenue, Great Neck Road (CR D01), Horrace Harding Boulevard, Merrivale Road, Middle Neck Road (CR 11), and Nassau Boulevard.

==== Rail ====
Although the Long Island Rail Road's Port Washington Branch passes through University Gardens and forms part of its northwestern boundary, there are no stations located within the hamlet. The nearest Long Island Rail Road stations to University Gardens are Great Neck and Little Neck.

==== Bus ====
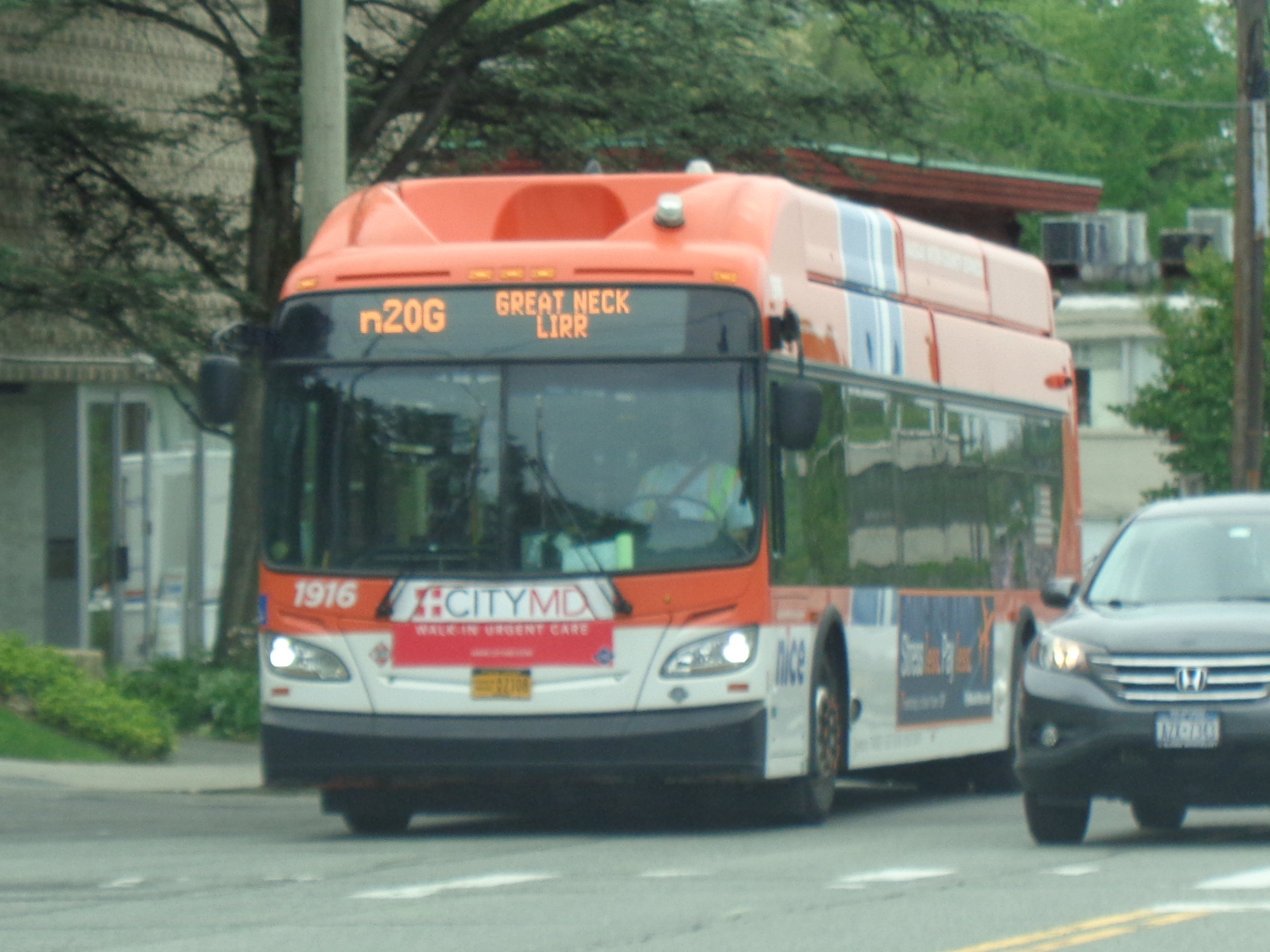
An eastbound n20G bus on Northern Boulevard in University Gardens in May 2017.

The n20G bus route travels along Northern Boulevard and Middle Neck Road through University Gardens, while the n20h, n21, n25, and n26 bus routes run through a small section of the northwestern portion of the hamlet, along Middle Neck Road. All five of these bus routes are operated by Nassau Inter-County Express (NICE).

=== Utilities ===
==== Natural gas ====
National Grid USA provides natural gas to homes and businesses that are hooked up to natural gas lines in University Gardens.

==== Power ====
PSEG Long Island provides power to all homes and businesses within University Gardens.

==== Sewage ====
University Gardens is connected to sanitary sewers. These sewers are operated by the Belgrave Sewer District, which the hamlet is entirety, is located within the boundaries of.

==== Water ====
University Gardens is located entirely within the boundaries of (and is thus served by) the Manhasset–Lakeville Water District.

== University Gardens subdivision ==
The University Gardens subdivision – the development for which the University Gardens CDP is named – is a distinct community founded in 1927. Built on the site of the former University Golf Club, the subdivision operates under a set of covenants recorded with its 218 homes and 17 commercial properties under the auspices of the University Gardens Property Owners Association, Inc.; it is located in the northeastern portion of the CDP.

The University Gardens Property Owners Association owns and maintains a neighborhood club on Sussex Road within the University Gardens subdivision, called the University Gardens Pool & Tennis Club. It is open exclusively to residents of the subdivision and their guests.
