= Thomaston, New York =

- Village
- Incorporated Village of Thomaston
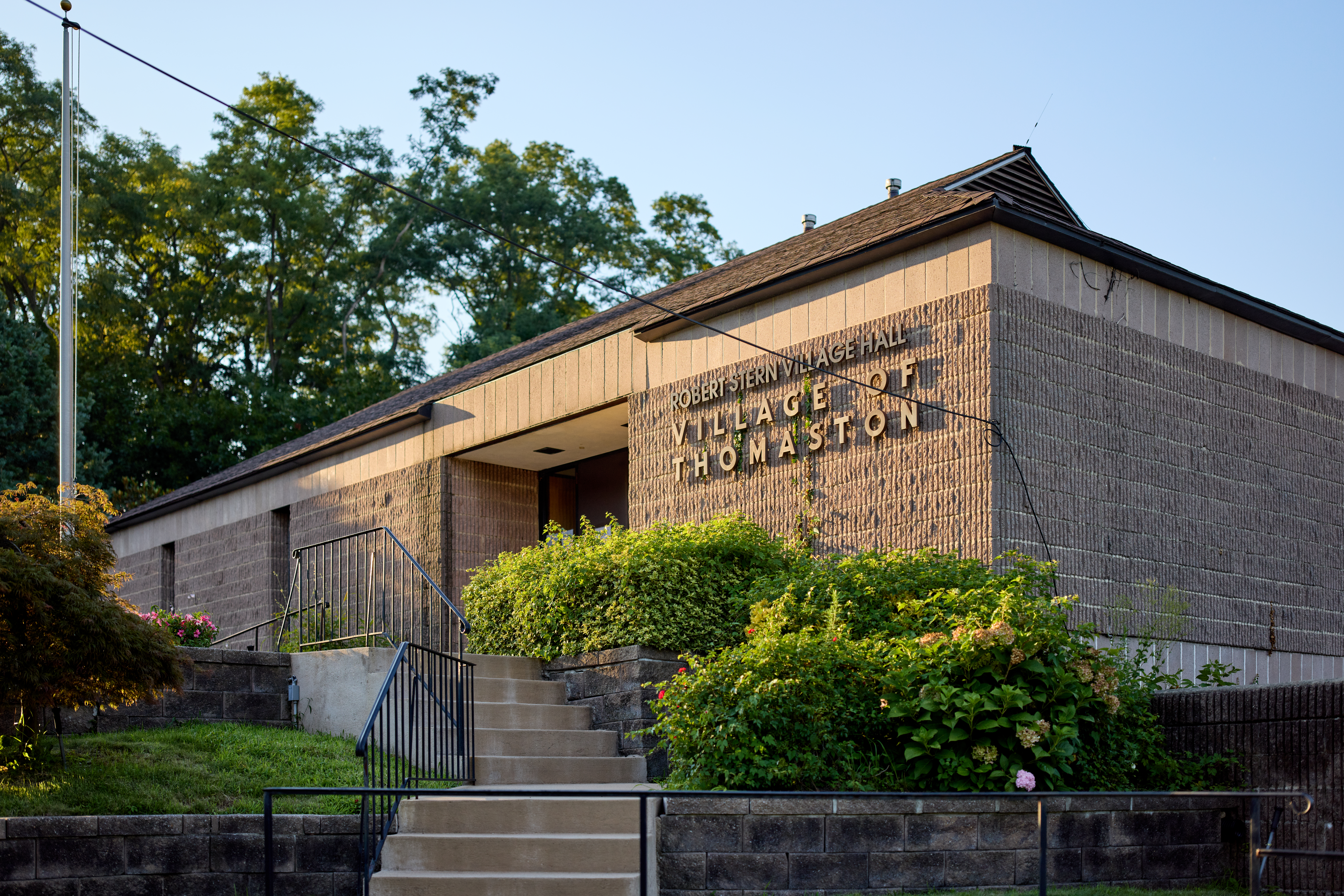
- Thomaston Village Hall in 2022

- Location in Nassau County and the state of New York

- Location on Long Island Location within the state of New York
- Coordinates: 40°47′17″N 73°42′51″W
- Country: United States
- State: New York
- County: Nassau
- Town: North Hempstead
- Incorporated: October 1, 1931
- Founder: Hunter L. DeLatour; Ernest A. Gallagher; Henry A. Singley; John W. Weight
- Named for: Thomaston, the ancestral home of Lillian Gilchrist.

Government
  - Mayor: Steven Weinberg
  - Deputy Mayor: Burton Weston

Area
  - Total: 0.41 sq mi (1.05 km^{2})
  - Land: 0.41 sq mi (1.05 km^{2})
  - Water: 0 sq mi (0.00 km^{2})
- Elevation: 200 ft (60 m)

Population (2020)
  - Total: 2,759
  - Density: 6,835.0/sq mi (2,638.99/km^{2})
- Time zone: UTC-5 (Eastern (EST))
  - Summer (DST): UTC-4 (EDT)
- ZIP Code: 11021 (Great Neck)
- Area codes: 516, 363
- FIPS code: 36-73605
- GNIS feature ID: 0967403
- Website: villageofthomastonny.gov

Thomaston is a village in the Town of North Hempstead, in Nassau County, on the North Shore of Long Island, in New York, United States. Located at the southeastern corner of the Great Neck Peninsula, it is considered part of the Greater Great Neck area, which is anchored by the Village of Great Neck. The population was 2,759 at the time of the 2020 census.

== History ==
Thomaston officially became an incorporated village on October 1, 1931, after the majority of residents voted in favor of incorporation to preserve home rule on September 17; 80 voted in favor of the incorporation, while 33 voted against it. Originally, the incorporation proposal included University Gardens and Russell Gardens. However, University Gardens chose not to be included in the proposal and Russell Gardens decided to incorporate itself separately thats same year.

The founders of the Incorporated Village of Thomaston were John W. Weight, Hunter L. DeLatour, Ernest A. Gallagher, and Henry A. Singley.

Thomaston Village Hall was constructed in 1971 in order to provide for more efficient government operations and a permanent home for Thomaston's government. It was designed by the Great Neck-based architectural firm of Blum & Nerzig.

Prior to Village Hall's construction, meetings were typically held in the nearby firehouse and village records were stored in the homes of the Village Clerks.

=== Thomaston's name ===
The name Thomaston has been used to describe the area since the middle part of the 19th Century. William R. Grace, a prominent local who would eventually become the Mayor of New York City, acquired a large area of land around the Long Island Rail Road's Great Neck station; the land he acquired included all of present-day Great Neck Plaza. Grace named the area Thomaston after the ancestral home of his wife, Lillian Gilchrist, located in Maine.

At some point, that area's name was changed to Great Neck Plaza, which would ultimately stick and become the name that village incorporated under in 1930.

When the area now known as Thomaston decided to incorporate itself as a village the next year, the residents chose to use this name for their new village since members of the Grace family continued to own land in the area.

== Geography ==
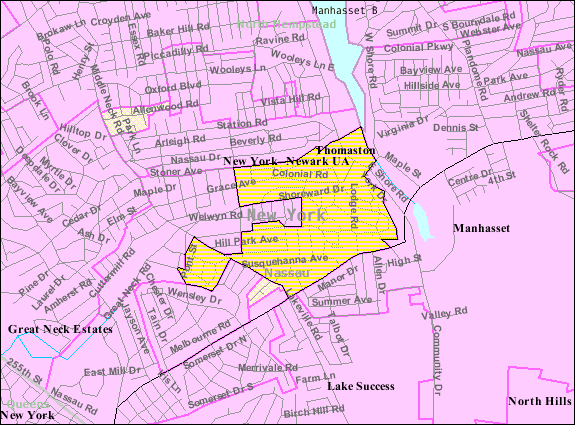
U.S. Census map of Thomaston

According to the United States Census Bureau, the village has a total area of 0.4 square miles (1.0 km^{2}), all land.

=== Topography ===
Like the rest of Long Island's North Shore, Thomaston is situated on a terminal moraine, known as the Harbor Hill Moraine. This terminal moraine was formed by glaciers during the Wisconsin Glacial Episode, and is named for Harbor Hill in Roslyn; Harbor Hill is the highest geographic point in Nassau County.

=== Climate ===
Thomaston has a humid subtropical climate (Cfa), bordering on a hot-summer humid continental climate (Dfa). Accordingly, the village experiences hot, humid summers and cold winters, and experiences precipitation throughout the entirety of the year.

== Demographics ==
Historical population
Census	Pop.	Note	%±
1940	1,159		—
1950	2,045		76.4%
1960	2,767		35.3%
1970	2,811		1.6%
1980	2,684		−4.5%
1990	2,612		−2.7%
2000	2,607		−0.2%
2010	2,617		0.4%
2020	2,759		5.4%
U.S. Decennial Census

As of the census of 2000, there were 2,607 people, 973 households, and 724 families residing in the village. The population density was 6,247.9 inhabitants per square mile (2,412.3/km^{2}). There were 1,000 housing units at an average density of 2,396.6 per square mile (925.3/km^{2}). The racial makeup of the village was 81.09% White, 0.84% African American, 0.04% Native American, 13.69% Asian, 0.23% Pacific Islander, 2.38% from other races, and 1.73% from two or more races. Hispanic or Latino of any race were 7.94% of the population.

There were 973 households, out of which 34.3% had children under the age of 18 living with them, 65.1% were married couples living together, 6.9% had a female householder with no husband present, and 25.5% were non-families. 21.5% of all households were made up of individuals, and 11.0% had someone living alone who was 65 years of age or older. The average household size was 2.67 and the average family size was 3.12.

In the village, the population was spread out, with 23.4% under the age of 18, 4.6% from 18 to 24, 27.2% from 25 to 44, 27.4% from 45 to 64, and 17.3% who were 65 years of age or older. The median age was 42 years. For every 100 females, there were 91.7 males. For every 100 females age 18 and over, there were 89.0 males.

The median income for a household in the village was $92,706, and the median income for a family was $110,502. Males had a median income of $72,656 versus $49,474 for females. The per capita income for the village was $44,760. About 2.7% of families and 4.4% of the population were below the poverty line, including 2.3% of those under age 18 and 6.8% of those age 65 or over.

== Government ==
=== Village government ===
As of June 2025, the Mayor of Thomaston is Steven Weinberg, the Deputy Mayor is Burton Weston, and the Village Trustees are Jay W. Chagrin, Aaron Halpern, and Nancy Sherman.

=== Representation in higher government ===
==== Town representation ====
Thomaston is located in the Town of North Hempstead's 5th council district, which as of June 2025 is represented on the North Hempstead Town Council by David A. Adhami (R–Great Neck).

==== Nassau County representation ====
Thomaston is located in Nassau County's 10th Legislative district, which as of June 2025 is represented in the Nassau County Legislature by Mazi Melesa Pilip (R–Great Neck).

==== New York State representation ====
===== New York State Assembly =====
Thomaston is located in the New York State Assembly's 16th State Assembly district, which as of June 2025 is represented by Daniel J. Norber (R–Great Neck).

===== New York State Senate =====
Thomaston is located in the New York State Senate's 7th State Senate district, which as of June 2025 is represented in the New York State Senate by Jack M. Martins (R–Old Westbury).

==== Federal representation ====
===== United States Congress =====
Thomaston is located in New York's 3rd congressional district, which as of June 2025 is represented in the United States Congress by Thomas R. Suozzi (D–Glen Cove).

===== United States Senate =====
Like the rest of New York, Thomaston is represented in the United States Senate by Charles Schumer (D) and Kirsten Gillibrand (D).

=== Politics ===
In the 2024 U.S. presidential election, the majority of Thomaston voters voted for Kamala D. Harris (D).

== Education ==
=== School districts ===
The majority of Thomaston is located within the boundaries of (and is thus served by) the Great Neck Union Free School District, although a small part of the village's northeastern corner is located within the Manhasset Union Free School District (though all homes are in the Great Neck part of Thomaston). As such, all children who reside within Thomaston and attend public schools go to Great Neck's schools.

=== Library districts ===
The majority of Thomaston is located within the boundaries of (and is thus served by) the Great Neck Library District, although a small part of the village's northeastern corner is located within the Manhasset Library District (though all homes are in the Great Neck part of Thomaston). The boundaries of both library districts within the village roughly correspond with those of the two school districts

== Infrastructure ==
=== Transportation ===
==== Road ====
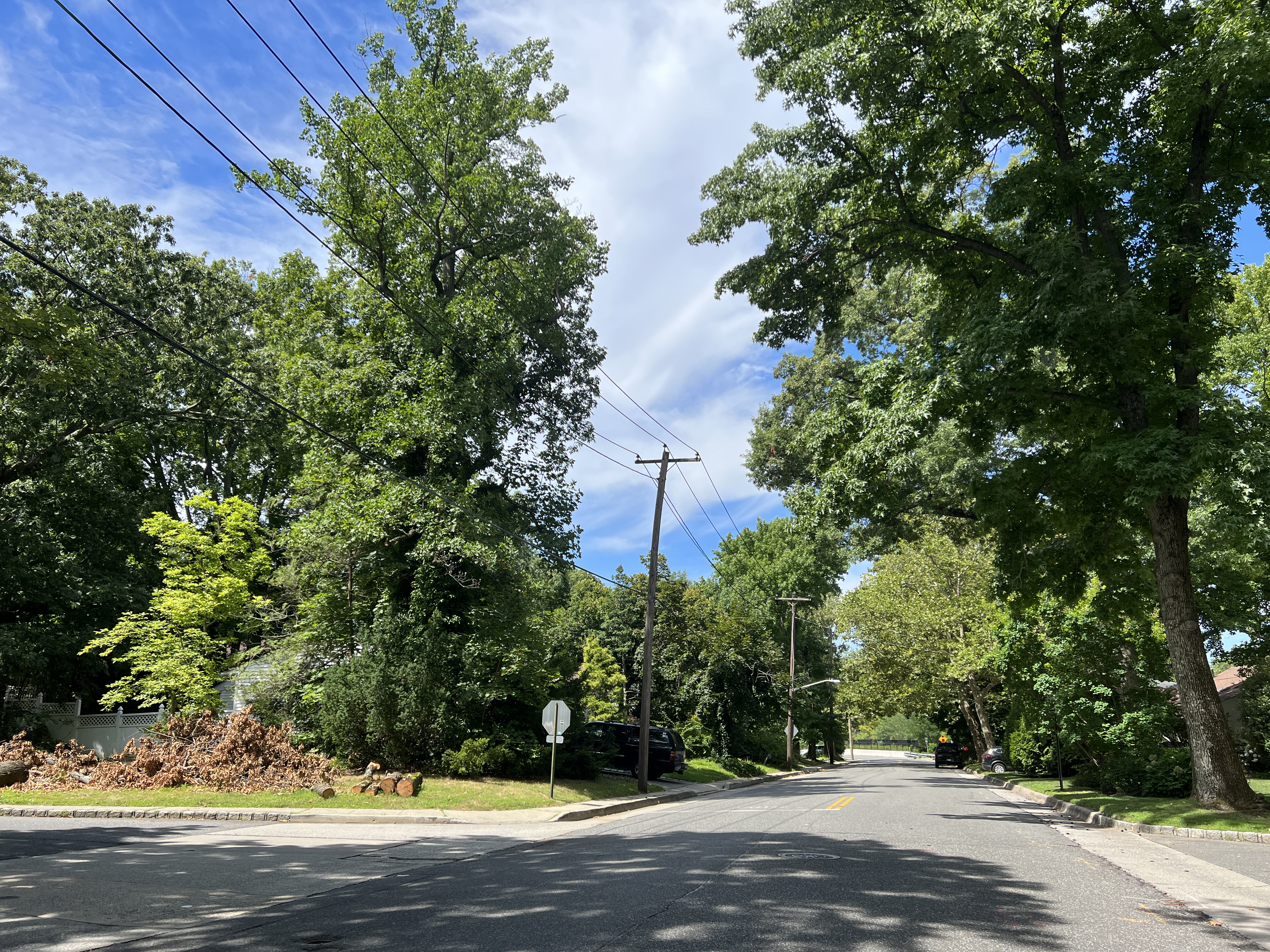
Colonial Road, one of the busiest roads within Thomaston, in 2022

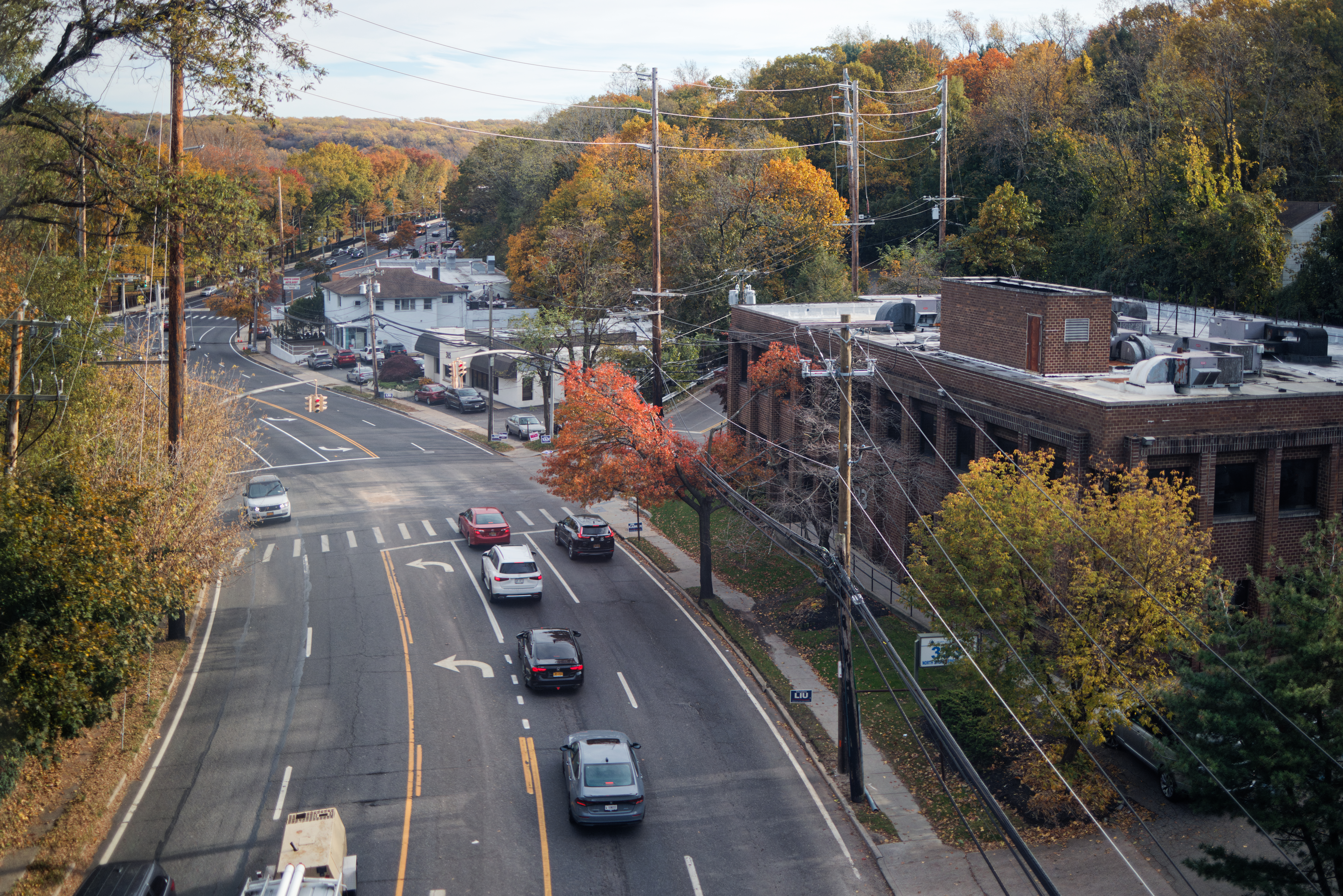
East Shore Road in 2023

One state-owned road – Northern Boulevard (NY 25A) – travels through Thomaston; Northern Boulevard forms the village's southern boundary, with Lake Success and the Spinney Hill section of Manahsset.

Other major roads within the village include Colonial Road, East Shore Road, Grace Avenue, and Shoreward Drive. A small portion of Middle Neck Road also passes through the village.

==== Rail ====
Although the Long Island Rail Road's Port Washington Branch passes through the village, there are no stations located within the village. The nearest Long Island Rail Road station to the village is Great Neck.

Part of the LIRR's Manhasset Viaduct is located within the village's boundaries.

==== Bus ====
Thomaston is served by the n20G, n20H, n20X, n21, n25, n26, and n57 bus routes, which are operated by Nassau Inter-County Express (NICE). All of these bus routes (excluding the n20X and n57) travel through the area via Northern Boulevard and Middle Neck Road.

The n20X travels solely travels along Northern Boulevard within the village, while the n57 briefly passes through the village via Gilchrest Road and Grace Avenue.

=== Utilities ===
==== Natural gas ====
National Grid USA provides natural gas to homes and businesses that are hooked up to natural gas lines in Thomaston.

==== Power ====
PSEG Long Island provides power to all homes and businesses within Thomaston. Additionally, PSEG's Port Washington to Great Neck Overhead Transmission Line passes through the village.

==== Sewage ====
Thomaston is connected to sanitary sewers. The eastern portions of the village are within the boundaries of (and are thus served by) the Great Neck Water Pollution Control District. The small portion of the village west of Middle Neck Road is within the boundaries of (and is thus served by) the Belgrave Sewer District.

==== Water ====
Thomaston is primarily located within the boundaries of the Manhasset–Lakeville Water District, which provides the majority of Thomaston with water. However, some areas of the village north of the Long Island Rail Road's tracks are within the boundaries of (and are thus served by) the Water Authority of Great Neck North.

Additionally, the Manhasset–Lakeville Water District owns and operates a water tower within the village, known as the Thomaston Tank.

== Notable people ==
- Jane Crowl – Actress and playwright.
- Thomas P. DiNapoli – Comptroller of the State of New York, former New York State Assemblyman, and a former Democratic candidate for Nassau County Executive.
- Groucho Marx – Entertainer; lived on Lincoln Road.
- Helen Morgan – Jazz singer and actress.

== See also ==
- List of municipalities in New York
- Great Neck Peninsula
