= Belgrave Sewer District =

Public sewer district in New York, United States

District overview
- Formed: September 17, 1928
- Type: Sewage treatment
- Status: Active
- Headquarters: 34-01 255th Street, Little Neck, NY 11363; Great Neck Estates, New York, United States; 40°46′42″N 73°44′33″W

The Belgrave Sewer District (also known as the Belgrave Water Pollution Control District or simply BWPCD) is a public sewer district in Nassau County, on Long Island, in New York, United States. It serves portions of the Greater Great Neck area on Long Island's North Shore.

== Description ==
The Belgrave Sewer District is a special district of the Town of North Hempstead. It was established by the North Hempstead Town Council on September 17, 1928. It is one of two major sewage systems in the Great Neck area – the other being the Great Neck Water Pollution Control District.

The district's sewage treatment plant is located adjacent to Little Neck Bay. In 1971, the government criticized the district in a pollution report for inadequately handling sewage; it was stated that the district was responsible for polluting Little Neck Bay.

In the mid-1970s, the Belgrave Sewer District proposed filling in a 150-by-290-foot area of the Udalls Cove wetlands near its sewage treatment plant, which at the time was 46 years old. The proposal was denied by the Village of Great Neck Estates and the New York State Department of Environmental Conservation, which stated that the project would cause severe damage to the surrounding environment.

The Belgrave Sewer District is headquartered at its treatment plant, located within the Village of Great Neck Estates, at its western border with Queens.

== Communities served ==
- Lake Success (under contract with that village)
- Portions of Great Neck Estates
- Portions of Great Neck Plaza
- Portions of Thomaston
- Russell Gardens
- University Gardens

== See also ==
- Special districts in New York (state)
- Great Neck Water Pollution Control District
- Port Washington Water Pollution Control District
