= Great Neck Gardens, New York =

Great Neck Gardens, New York Allenwood
- Hamlet and census-designated place
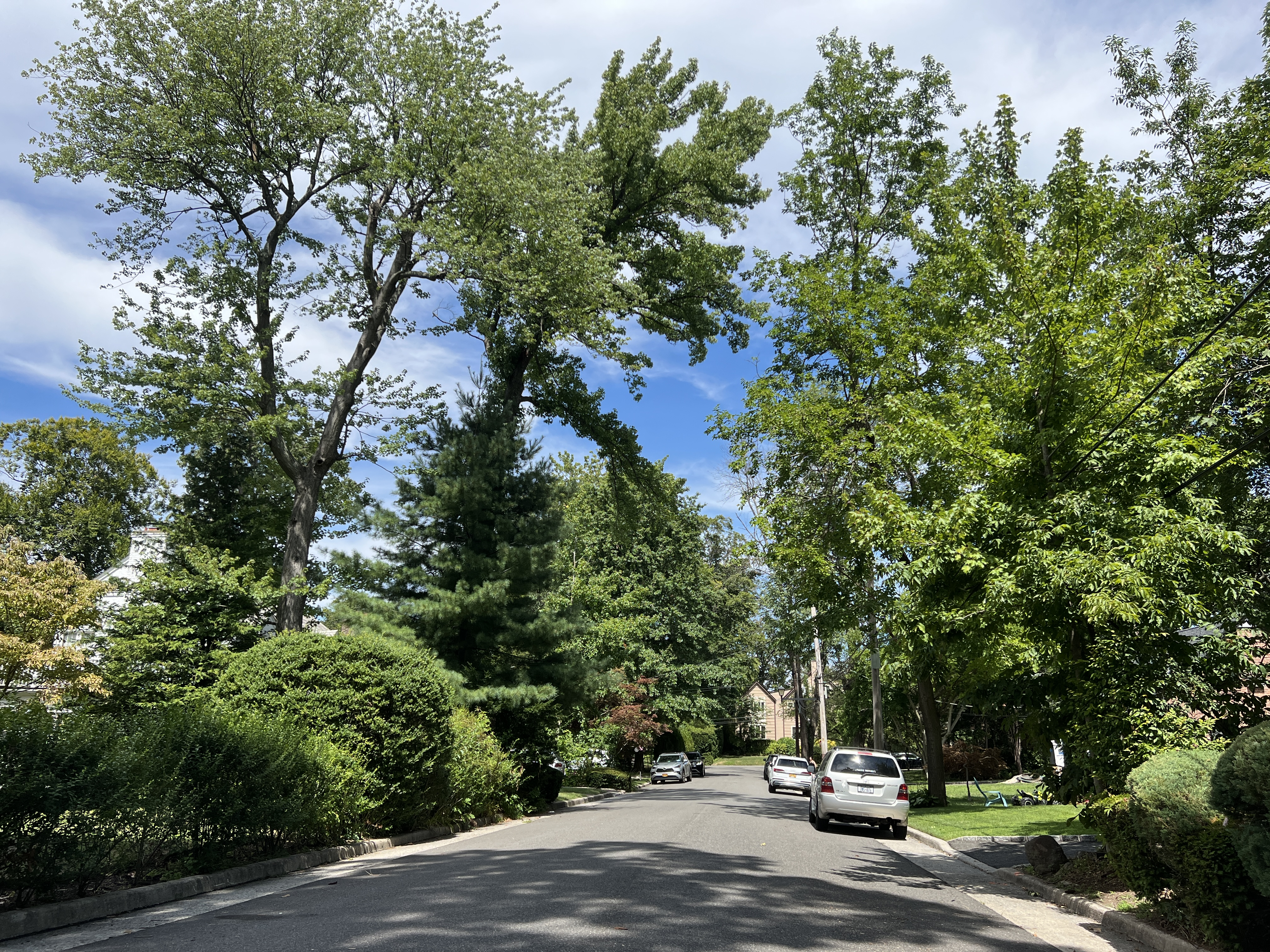
- Locust Street in Great Neck Gardens in 2022

- Location in Nassau County and the state of New York

- Location on Long Island Location within the state of New York
- Coordinates: 40°47′52″N 73°43′19″W
- Country: United States
- State: New York
- County: Nassau
- Town: North Hempstead

Area
  - Total: 0.18 sq mi (0.47 km^{2})
  - Land: 0.18 sq mi (0.47 km^{2})
  - Water: 0 sq mi (0.00 km^{2})
- Elevation: 184 ft (56 m)

Population (2020)
  - Total: 1,268
  - Density: 7,030.3/sq mi (2,714.41/km^{2})
- Time zone: UTC-5 (Eastern (EST))
  - Summer (DST): UTC-4 (EDT)
- ZIP Codes: 11023, 11021 (Great Neck)
- Area codes: 516, 363
- FIPS code: 36-30202
- GNIS feature ID: 1852900

Great Neck Gardens (also known as Allenwood) is a hamlet and census-designated place (CDP) located on the Great Neck Peninsula within the Town of North Hempstead, in Nassau County, on the North Shore of Long Island, New York, United States. The population was 1,268 at the time of the 2020 census.

The hamlet's name is rarely used in part because of how the area was never incorporated.

== History ==
The Great Neck Gardens CDP was first created for the 2000 United States Census.

Like the rest of the Great Neck Peninsula, this area was historically known as Madnan's Neck.

The Allen family was one of the first European families to settle in the Great Neck area. They owned large portions of property (including farms) now located within modern-day Great Neck Gardens.

== Geography ==
According to the United States Census Bureau, the CDP has a total area of 0.2 square miles (0.52 km^{2}), all land.

== Demographics ==
Historical population
Census	Pop.	Note	%±
2000	1,089		—
2010	1,186		8.9%
2020	1,268		6.9%
U.S. Decennial Census

As of the census of 2000, there were 1,089 people, 376 households, and 327 families residing in the CDP. The population density was 6,467.8 inhabitants per square mile (2,497.2/km^{2}). There were 381 housing units at an average density of 2,262.8 per square mile (873.7/km^{2}). The racial makeup of the CDP was 89.35% White, 0.83% African American, 7.44% Asian, 0.73% from other races, and 1.65% from two or more races. Hispanic or Latino of any race were 2.30% of the population.

There were 376 households, out of which 41.2% had children under the age of 18 living with them, 79.5% were married couples living together, 6.6% had a female householder with no husband present, and 13.0% were non-families. 12.2% of all households were made up of individuals, and 8.8% had someone living alone who was 65 years of age or older. The average household size was 2.90 and the average family size was 3.11.

In the CDP, the population was spread out, with 28.3% under the age of 18, 3.8% from 18 to 24, 21.2% from 25 to 44, 30.4% from 45 to 64, and 16.3% who were 65 years of age or older. The median age was 42 years. For every 100 females, there were 103.2 males. For every 100 females age 18 and over, there were 95.3 males.

The median income for a household in the CDP was $124,175, and the median income for a family was $142,915. Males had a median income of $94,401 versus $56,071 for females. The per capita income for the CDP was $49,317. None of the population or families were below the poverty line.

== Government ==
=== Town representation ===
As Great Neck Gardens is an unincorporated hamlet, it has no government of its own, and is instead governed directly by the Town of North Hempstead's government in Manhasset.

Great Neck Gardens is located in the Town of North Hempstead's 5th district, which as of March 2026 is represented in the North Hempstead Town Council by Yaron Levy (R–Harbor Hills).

=== Representation in higher government ===
==== Nassau County representation ====
Great Neck Gardens is located in Nassau County's 10th Legislative district, which as of March 2026 is represented in the Nassau County Legislature by Mazi Melesa Pilip (R–Great Neck).

==== New York State representation ====
===== New York State Assembly =====
Great Neck Gardens is located in the New York State Assembly's 16th State Assembly district, which as of March 2026 is represented by Daniel J. Norber (R–Great Neck).

===== New York State Senate =====
Great Neck Gardens is located in the New York State Senate's 7th State Senate district, which as of March 2026 is represented in the New York State Senate by Jack M. Martins (R–Old Westbury).

==== Federal representation ====
===== United States Congress =====
Great Neck Gardens is located in New York's 3rd congressional district, which as of March 2026 is represented in the United States Congress by Thomas R. Suozzi (D–Glen Cove).

===== United States Senate =====
Like the rest of New York, Great Neck Gardens is represented in the United States Senate by Charles Schumer (D) and Kirsten Gillibrand (D).

=== Politics ===
In the 2024 U.S. presidential election, the majority of Great Neck Gardens voters voted for Donald J. Trump (R).

== Parks & recreation ==
- Allenwood Park – A major park located in the southern part of the hamlet operated by the Great Neck Park District, which Great Neck gardens is located within.

== See also ==
- Great Neck Estates, New York
- Great Neck (village), New York
- Harbor Hills, New York
- Saddle Rock Estates, New York
