= Great Neck Water Pollution Control District =

Public sewer management district

District overview
- Formed: 1914
- Type: Sewage treatment
- Status: Active
- Headquarters: 236 East Shore Road, Great Neck, NY; 40°47′43″N 73°42′45.5″W
- Website: gnwpcd.net

The Great Neck Water Pollution Control District (abbreviated as GNWPCD) is a public sewer district in Nassau County, on Long Island, in New York, United States. It serves large portions of the Great Neck Peninsula and portions of Manhasset.

== History ==
The Great Neck Water Pollution Control District was established in 1914. A major upgrade project took place in 1990, during which the district's sewage treatment capacity was increased to 3.8 million gallons per day.

In the 2010s and 2020s, plans were made to connect Plandome Road in Manhasset to the Great Neck Water Pollution Control District's sanitary sewers. Similar proposals have been discussed for decades but were historically met with opposition, which killed some of the previous proposals to sewer the area. The planned project is supported by the district.

In 2019, ground was broken on the extension project connecting the Americana Manhasset to the Great Neck Water Pollution Control District's sanitary sewers.

In 2021, a $150,000 grant was awarded to the district in order for it to conduct a sewer feasibility study for connecting unsewered areas of Great Neck Estates and Harbor Hills to the sewer system.

== Statistics ==
- Treatment capacity: 5.8 million gallons per day
- Sewer network length (as of 8/2021): Approximately 72 miles (116 km)

== Communities served ==
- Great Neck Gardens
- Great Neck Plaza (partial service)
- Great Neck
- Harbor Hills (partial service)
- Kensington
- Manhasset (partial service)
- Saddle Rock
- Saddle Rock Estates
- Thomaston
