= Russell Gardens, New York =

- Village
- Incorporated Village of Russell Gardens
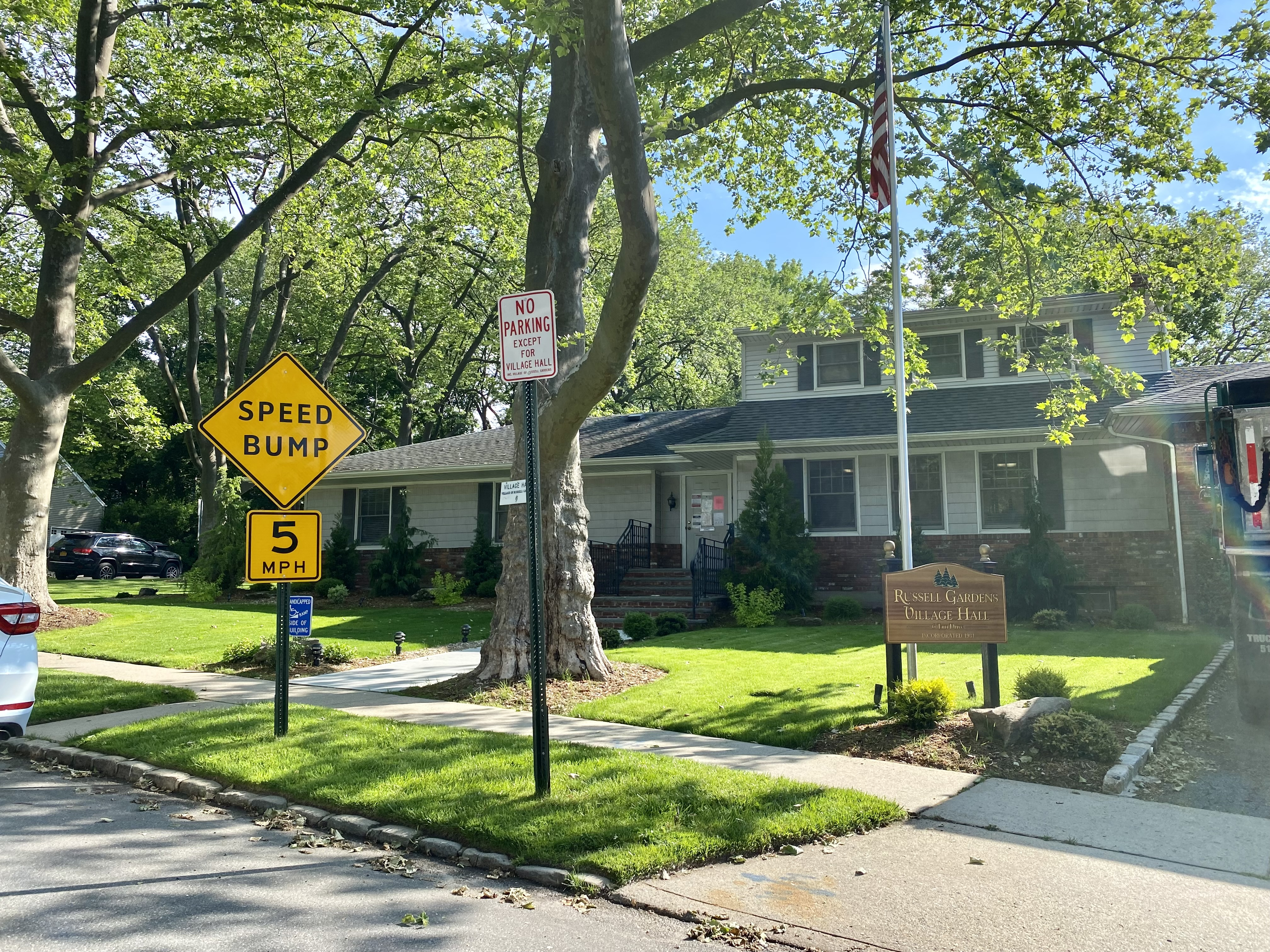
- Russell Gardens Village Hall in 2021

- Official seal of Russell Gardens

- Location in Nassau County and the state of New York.

- Location on Long Island Location within the state of New York
- Coordinates: 40°46′52″N 73°43′30″W
- Country: United States
- State: New York
- County: Nassau
- Town: North Hempstead
- Incorporated: September 23, 1931
- Named for: Captain Frederick Russell

Government
  - Mayor: David Miller
  - Deputy Mayor: Lawrence Chaleff

Area
  - Total: 0.17 sq mi (0.45 km^{2})
  - Land: 0.17 sq mi (0.45 km^{2})
  - Water: 0 sq mi (0.00 km^{2})
- Elevation: 130 ft (40 m)

Population (2020)
  - Total: 978
  - Density: 5,632.8/sq mi (2,174.83/km^{2})
- Time zone: UTC−5 (Eastern (EST))
  - Summer (DST): UTC−4 (EDT)
- ZIP Code: 11021 (Great Neck)
- Area codes: 516, 363
- FIPS code: 36-64232
- GNIS feature ID: 0963113
- Website: www.russellgardens.com

Russell Gardens is a village on the Great Neck Peninsula in the Town of North Hempstead, in Nassau County, on the North Shore of Long Island, in New York, United States. The population was 978 at the 2020 census.

The area was proposed to become part of neighboring Thomaston in that village's original incorporation plans – but residents objected and decided instead to incorporate Russell Gardens as a separate village that same year.

== History ==
Russell Gardens was originally developed by Francis H. Knighton, who had previously played a small role in the Rickert–Finlay Realty Company, which developed the nearby community of Kensington. The land was largely pastoral, and games of polo were often played in the open fields.

The majority of the 135-acre (55 ha) area now encompassing the village was originally part of the estate of Captain Frederick Russell. The estate had previously been owned by the Schenck family and subsequently by the Haviland family. Other areas were purchased from Arthur Cushman, as well as from others. After purchasing the land, Knighton quickly started to develop it, and chose to name his development after Captain Russel by naming it Russell Gardens; the name would become Russell Gardens, Incorporated when Knighton opted to incorporate the syndicate which had been assisting him in the financing of his endeavors.

The group would continue developing the community, laying out streets, utilities, and parkland. They opted to place all of the community's wiring underground and had landscaper J.J. Levinson landscape for the community.

In 1931, around the same time when neighboring Thomaston proposed incorporating itself and potentially taking in this development as part of their village, the residents felt that in order to maintain the character of their community, it would be imperative for them to incorporate Russell Gardens as a separate village in order to create and pass their own zoning ordinances. Subsequently, the majority of Russell Gardens residents ultimately voted in favor of incorporation that year, and Russell Gardens officially became its own incorporated village on September 23, 1931.

In 1981, Russell Gardens established its own Village Justice Court; its establishment allowed for the village to begin handling traffic- and municipal code-related issues locally.

== Geography ==
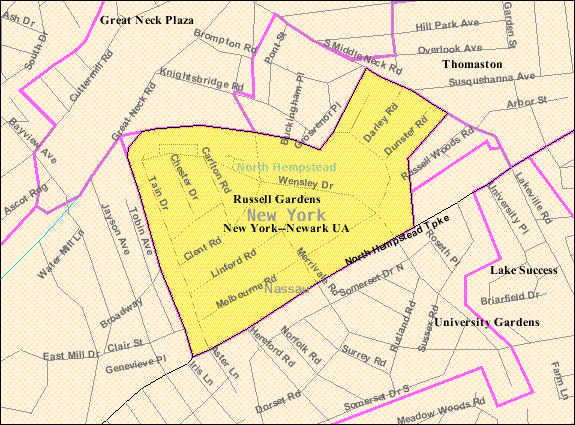
U.S. Census map of Russell Gardens.

According to the United States Census Bureau, the village has a total area of 0.2 square miles (0.52 km^{2}), all land.

== Demographics ==
Historical population
Census	Pop.	Note	%±
1940	556		—
1950	912		64.0%
1960	1,156		26.8%
1970	1,207		4.4%
1980	1,263		4.6%
1990	1,027		−18.7%
2000	1,074		4.6%
2010	945		−12.0%
2020	978		3.5%
U.S. Decennial Census

=== Racial and ethnic composition ===
Russell Gardens village, New York – Racial and ethnic composition Note: the US Census treats Hispanic/Latino as an ethnic category. This table excludes Latinos from the racial categories and assigns them to a separate category. Hispanics/Latinos may be of any race.
Race / Ethnicity (NH = Non-Hispanic)	Pop 2000	Pop 2010	Pop 2020	% 2000	% 2010	% 2020
White alone (NH)	885	691	492	82.40%	73.12%	50.31%
Black or African American alone (NH)	6	2	3	0.56%	0.21%	0.31%
Native American or Alaska Native alone (NH)	0	0	0	0.00%	0.00%	0.00%
Asian alone (NH)	113	194	418	10.52%	20.53%	42.74%
Native Hawaiian or Pacific Islander alone (NH)	1	0	1	0.09%	0.00%	0.10%
Other race alone (NH)	0	1	10	0.00%	0.11%	1.02%
Mixed race or Multiracial (NH)	15	20	24	1.40%	2.12%	2.45%
Hispanic or Latino (any race)	54	37	30	5.03%	3.92%	3.07%
Total	1,074	945	978	100.00%	100.00%	100.00%

=== 2000 census ===
As of the census of 2000, there were 1,074 people, 400 households, and 296 families residing in the village. The population density was 5,865.0 inhabitants per square mile (2,264.5/km^{2}). There were 409 housing units at an average density of 2,233.5 per square mile (862.4/km^{2}). The racial makeup of the village was 85.94% White, 0.56% African American, 0.09% Native American, 10.61% Asian, 0.09% Pacific Islander, 1.02% from other races, and 1.68% from two or more races. Hispanic or Latino of any race were 5.03% of the population.

There were 400 households, out of which 39.3% had children under the age of 18 living with them, 68.5% were married couples living together, 4.0% had a female householder with no husband present, and 26.0% were non-families. 24.3% of all households were made up of individuals, and 11.5% had someone living alone who was 65 years of age or older. The average household size was 2.66 and the average family size was 3.19.

In the village, the age distribution of the population shows 26.7% under the age of 18, 3.9% from 18 to 24, 25.1% from 25 to 44, 27.5% from 45 to 64, and 16.8% who were 65 years of age or older. The median age was 42 years. For every 100 females, there were 102.3 males. For every 100 females age 18 and over, there were 91.0 males.

The median income for a household in the village was $108,427, and the median income for a family was $142,636. Males had a median income of $100,000 versus $56,250 for females. The per capita income for the village was $58,680. About 2.4% of families and 3.7% of the population were below the poverty line, including 1.0% of those under age 18 and 13.0% of those age 65 or over.

== Government ==
=== Village government ===
As of July 2023, the Mayor of Russell Gardens is David Miller, the Deputy Mayor is Lawrence Chaleff, and the Village Trustees are Martin Adickman, Matthew Ellis, and Jane Krakauer.

=== Representation in higher government ===
==== Town representation ====
Russell Gardens is located in the Town of North Hempstead's 5th district, which as of July 2023 is represented on the North Hempstead Town Council by David A. Adhami (R–Great Neck).

==== Nassau County representation ====
Russell Gardens is located in Nassau County's 10th Legislative district, which as of July 2023 is represented in the Nassau County Legislature by Mazi Melesa Pilip (R–Great Neck).

==== New York State representation ====
===== New York State Assembly =====
Russell Gardens is located in the New York State Assembly's 16th State Assembly district, which as of July 2023 is represented by Gina L. Sillitti (D–Manorhaven).

===== New York State Senate =====
Russell Gardens is located in the New York State Senate's 7th State Senate district, which as of July 2023 is represented in the New York State Senate by Jack M. Martins (R–Old Westbury).

==== Federal representation ====
===== United States Congress =====
Russell Gardens is located in New York's 3rd congressional district, which as of July 2023 is represented in the United States Congress by George A. Santos (R).

===== United States Senate =====
Like the rest of New York, Russell Gardens is represented in the United States Senate by Charles Schumer (D) and Kirsten Gillibrand (D).

=== Politics ===
In the 2016 U.S. presidential election, the majority of Russell Gardens voters voted for Hillary Clinton (D).

== Education ==
=== School district ===
Russell Gardens is located entirely within the boundaries of the Great Neck Union Free School District. As such, all children who reside within the village and attend public schools go to Great Neck's schools.

==== School zones ====
===== Elementary =====
For elementary education, Russell Gardens, in its entirety, is zoned for Lakeville Elementary School. As such, all children who reside within Russell Gardens and attend Great Neck's elementary schools go to Lakeville Elementary School.

===== Secondary =====
For secondary education, Russell Gardens, in its entirety, is zoned for Great Neck South Middle School and Great Neck South High School.

=== Library district ===
Russell Gardens is located within the boundaries of the Great Neck Library District, which is served by the Great Neck Public Library.

== Infrastructure ==
=== Transportation ===
==== Road ====
Northern Boulevard (New York State Route 25A) passes through the village and forms its southern boundary. Other major roads include Clent Road, Middle Neck Road (CR 11), and Wensley Drive.

==== Rail ====
There are no train stations located within the village. The nearest Long Island Rail Road stations are Great Neck and Little Neck on the Port Washington Branch.

==== Bus ====
The n20G bus route travels along Northern Boulevard and Middle Neck Road through Russell Gardens. This bus line is operated by Nassau Inter-County Express (NICE). Additionally, NICE's n20h, n21, n25, and n26 bus routes run through a small section of the northwestern portion of the village, along Middle Neck Road.

=== Utilities ===
==== Natural gas ====
National Grid USA provides natural gas to homes and businesses that are hooked up to natural gas lines in Russell Gardens.

==== Power ====
PSEG Long Island provides power to all homes and businesses within Russell Gardens.

==== Sewage ====
Russell Gardens is connected to sanitary sewers. These sewers are operated by the Belgrave Sewer District.

==== Water ====
Russell Gardens is served by the Manhasset–Lakeville Water District.

== Notable people ==
- Douglass Dumbrille – Actor.
- Florence Eldridge – Actress; Eldridge resided in Russell Gardens with her husband, Fredric March.
- W. C. Fields – Actor, entertainer, and writer.
- D. W. Griffith – Film director and producer.
- Dennis King – Actor and singer.
- Fredric March – Actor; March resided in Russell Gardens with his wife, Florence Eldridge.
