= Great Neck (village), New York =

Great Neck, New York
- Village
- Incorporated Village of Great Neck
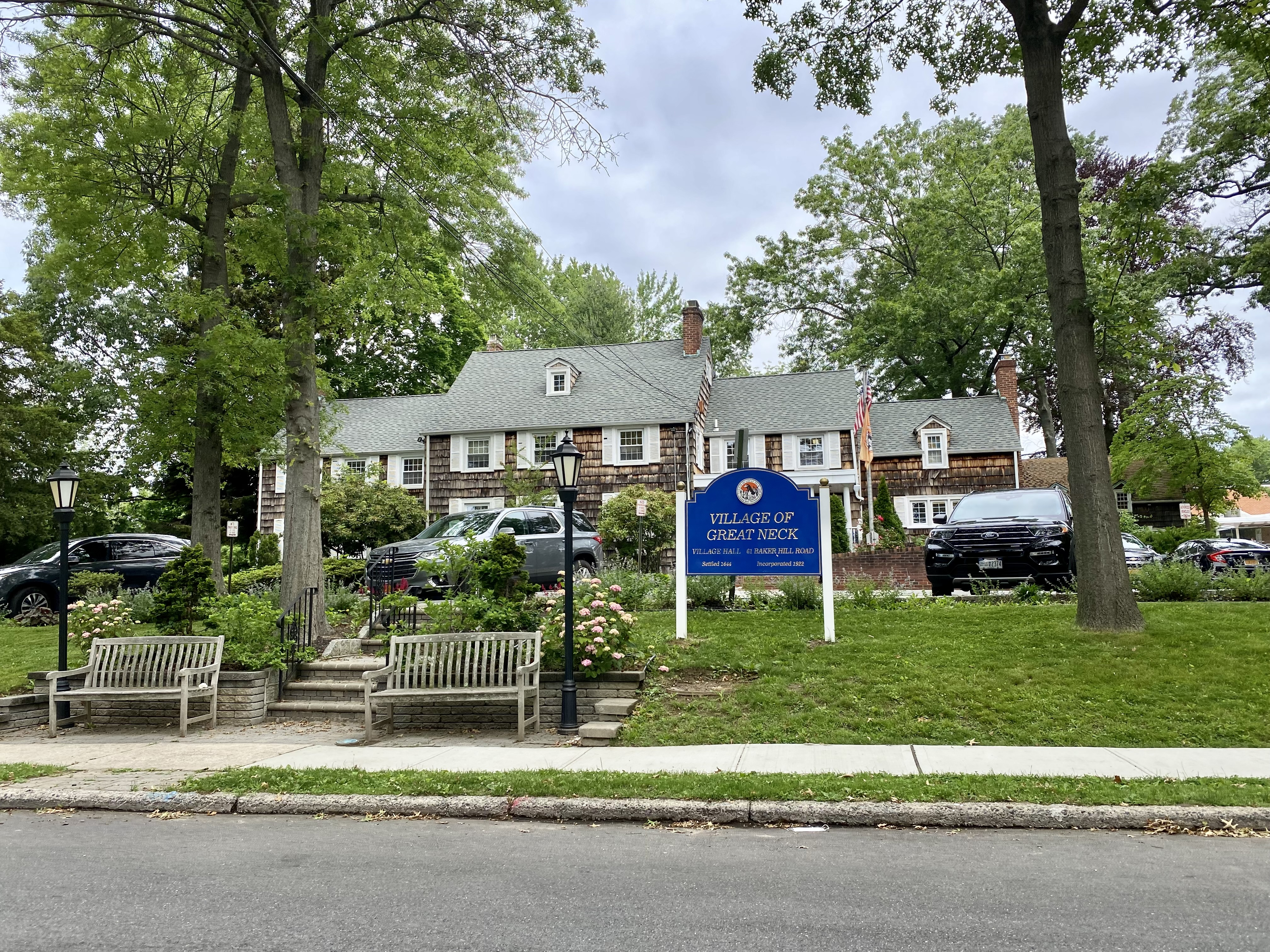
- Great Neck Village Hall on June 11, 2021

- Official seal of Great Neck Village
- Nickname: The Old Village
- Location in Nassau County and the state of New York

- Location on Long Island Location within the state of New York
- Coordinates: 40°48′10″N 73°43′53″W
- Country: United States
- State: New York
- County: Nassau County
- Town: North Hempstead
- First settled: 1644
- Incorporated: 1922

Government
  - Mayor: Pedram Bral
  - Deputy Mayor: Barton Sobel

Area
  - Total: 1.35 sq mi (3.50 km^{2})
  - Land: 1.32 sq mi (3.43 km^{2})
  - Water: 0.027 sq mi (0.07 km^{2}) 0%
- Elevation: 108 ft (33 m)

Population (2020)
  - Total: 11,145
  - Density: 8,415.4/sq mi (3,249.19/km^{2})
- Time zone: UTC-5 (Eastern (EST))
  - Summer (DST): UTC-4 (EDT)
- ZIP codes: 11021–11025
- Area codes: 516, 363
- FIPS code: 36-30169
- GNIS feature ID: 0951636
- Website: www.greatneckvillage.gov

Great Neck is a village in the town of North Hempstead in Nassau County, on the North Shore of Long Island, in New York, United States. The population was 11,145 at the time of the 2020 census.

The term Great Neck is also commonly applied to the entire, eponymous peninsula on the North Shore and an area extending south to and including Lake Success. The larger Great Neck area comprises a residential community of some 40,000 people made up of nine villages as well as multiple hamlets of North Hempstead – and, to distinguish the Village of Great Neck from the other villages in the Greater Great Neck area, it is sometimes referred to as "the Old Village".

== History ==
The Village of Great Neck incorporated as a village in 1922.

On August 9, 2022, Great Neck Village Hall was struck by lightning, which led to a fire breaking out and causing severe damage to parts of the building. Shortly afterwards, the Village announced its intentions to restore the structure, which was originally constructed in 1833.

== Geography ==
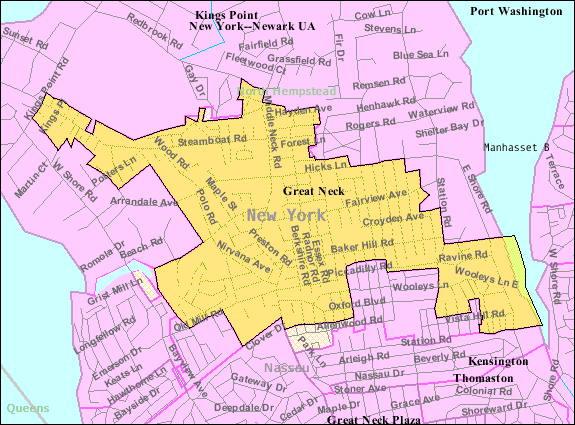
U.S. Census map of Great Neck.

According to the United States Census Bureau, the village has a total area of 1.4 square miles (3.6 km^{2}), of which 0.04 square miles (0.10 km^{2}), or 1.46%, is water.

== Demographics ==
Historical population
Census	Pop.	Note	%±
1880	1,112		—
1930	4,010		—
1940	6,167		53.8%
1950	7,759		25.8%
1960	10,171		31.1%
1970	10,798		6.2%
1980	9,168		−15.1%
1990	8,745		−4.6%
2000	9,538		9.1%
2010	9,989		4.7%
2020	11,145		11.6%
U.S. Decennial Census

=== Racial and ethnic composition ===
Great Neck village, New York – Racial and ethnic composition Note: the US Census treats Hispanic/Latino as an ethnic category. This table excludes Latinos from the racial categories and assigns them to a separate category. Hispanics/Latinos may be of any race.
Race / Ethnicity (NH = Non-Hispanic)	Pop 2000	Pop 2010	Pop 2020	% 2000	% 2010	% 2020
White alone (NH)	7,645	7,749	7,767	80.15%	77.58%	69.69%
Black or African American alone (NH)	255	176	145	2.67%	1.76%	1.30%
Native American or Alaska Native alone (NH)	0	2	5	0.00%	0.02%	0.04%
Asian alone (NH)	470	721	1,497	4.93%	7.22%	13.43%
Native Hawaiian or Pacific Islander alone (NH)	3	0	1	0.03%	0.00%	0.01%
Other race alone (NH)	35	17	97	0.37%	0.17%	0.87%
Mixed race or Multiracial (NH)	255	309	429	2.67%	3.09%	3.85%
Hispanic or Latino (any race)	875	1,015	1,204	9.17%	10.16%	10.80%
Total	9,538	9,989	11,145	100.00%	100.00%	100.00%

=== 2000 census ===
As of the census of 2000, there were 9,538 people, 3,346 households, and 2,552 families residing in the village. The population density was 7,062.3 inhabitants per square mile (2,726.8/km^{2}). There were 3,441 housing units at an average density of 2,547.9 units per square mile (983.7 units/km^{2}). The racial makeup of the village was 85.33% White, 2.82% African American, 0.10% Native American, 4.94% Asian, 0.04% Pacific Islander, 3.28% from other races, and 3.48% from two or more races. Hispanic or Latino of any race were 9.17% of the population.

As of 2000, the Village of Great Neck was the second most Iranian place in the United States with 21.1% of its population reporting Iranian ancestry, owing to an influx of Persian Jews who migrated after the 1979 Islamic Revolution. According to a study from the UJA-Federation of New York, over 50% of residents are Jewish, with a significant proportion of residents identifying as either Orthodox or Conservative (Masorti).

There were 3,346 households, out of which 36.6% had children under the age of 18 living with them, 63.9% were married couples living together, 8.8% had a female householder with no husband present, and 23.7% were non-families. 20.9% of all households were made up of individuals, and 12.2% had someone living alone who was 65 years of age or older. The average household size was 2.85 and the average family size was 3.30.

In the village, the population was spread out, with 26.4% under the age of 18, 6.0% from 18 to 24, 25.3% from 25 to 44, 24.7% from 45 to 64, and 17.5% who were 65 years of age or older. The median age was 40 years. For every 100 females, there were 94.2 males. For every 100 females age 18 and over, there were 90.0 males.

The median income for a household in the village was $76,645, and the median income for a family was $89,733. Males had a median income of $52,445 versus $37,476 for females. The per capita income for the village was $38,790. About 5.5% of families and 7.8% of the population were below the poverty line, including 9.5% of those under age 18 and 8.1% of those age 65 or over.

== Government ==
=== Village government ===
As of October 2024, the Mayor of Great Neck is Pedram Bral, the Deputy Mayor is Barton Sobel, and the Village Trustees are Steven Hope, Eli Kashi, and Anne Mendelson.

=== Representation in higher government ===
==== Town representation ====
The Village of Great Neck is located in the Town of North Hempstead's 5th council district, which as of April 2026 is represented on the North Hempstead Town Council by Yaron Levy (R–Harbor Hills).

==== Nassau County representation ====
The Village of Great Neck is located in Nassau County's 10th Legislative district, which as of April 2026 is represented in the Nassau County Legislature by Mazi Melesa Pilip (R–Great Neck).

==== New York State representation ====
===== New York State Assembly =====
The Village of Great Neck is located the New York State Assembly's 16th State Assembly district, which as of April 2026 is represented by Daniel J. Norber (R–Great Neck).

===== New York State Senate =====
The Village of Great Neck is located in the New York State Senate's 7th State Senate district, which as of April 2026 is represented by Jack M. Martins (R–Old Westbury).

==== Federal representation ====
===== United States Congress =====
The Village of Great Neck is located in New York's 3rd congressional district, which as of April 2026 is represented in the United States Congress by Thomas R. Suozzi (D–Glen Cove).

===== United States Senate =====
Like the rest of New York, the Village of Great Neck is represented in the United States Senate by Charles E. Schumer (D) and Kirsten E. Gillibrand (D).

=== Politics ===
In the 2024 U.S. presidential election, the majority of Great Neck voters voted for Donald J. Trump (R).

== Education ==
=== School district ===
The Village of Great Neck is located entirely within the boundaries of (and is thus served by) the Great Neck Union Free School District. As such, all children who reside within the village and attend public schools go to Great Neck's schools.

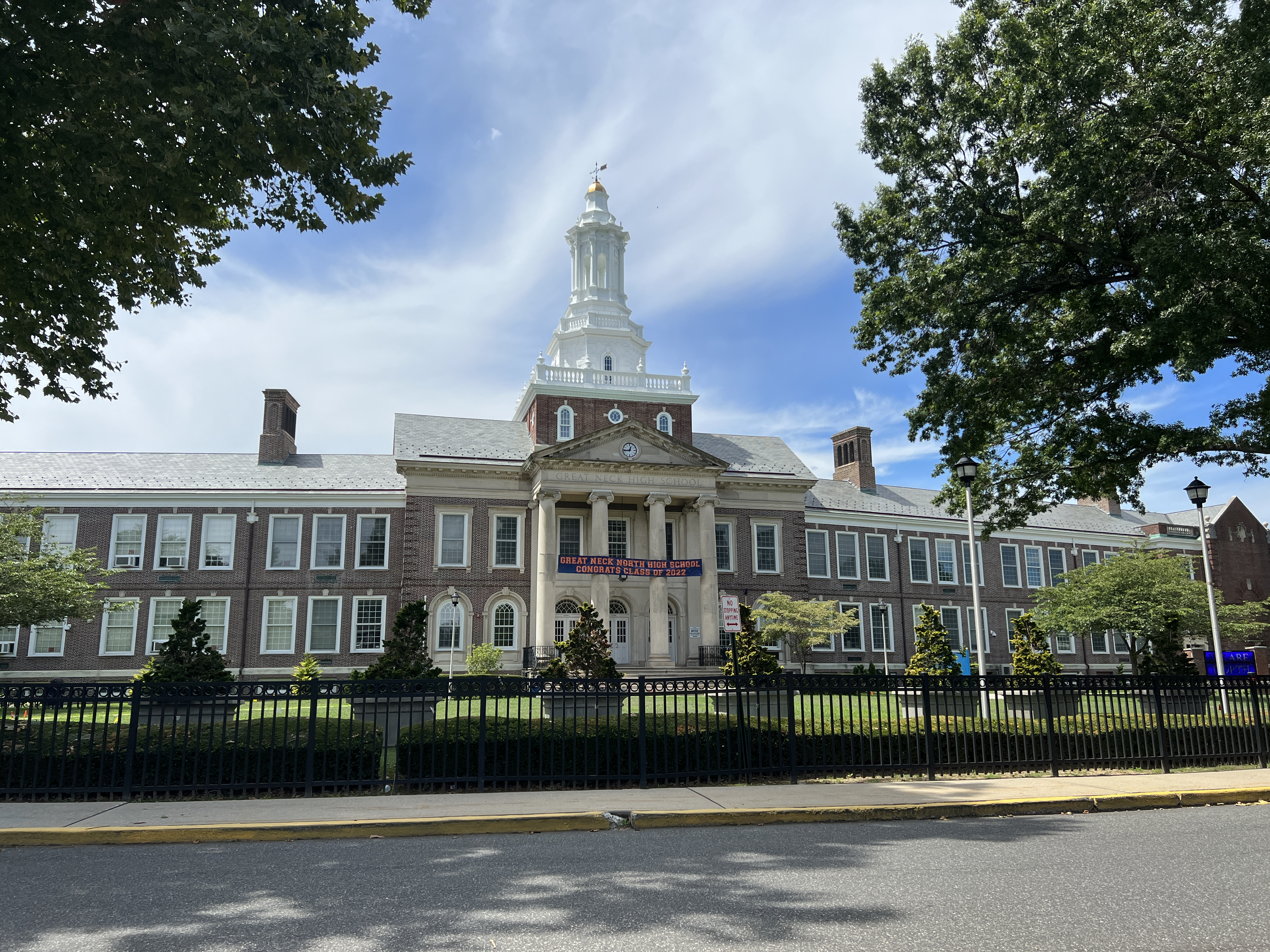
John L. Miller Great Neck North High School, located within the village, in 2022

Additionally, John L. Miller Great Neck North High School and the Village School are located within the village, and Great Neck North Middle School is located on the Incorporated Village of Great Neck's border, with the Incorporated Village of Kings Point.

=== Library district ===
The Village of Great Neck is located wholly within the boundaries of (and is thus served by) the Great Neck Library District.

== Infrastructure ==
=== Transportation ===
==== Road ====
Major roadways in the Village of Great Neck include Arrandale Avenue, Baker Hill Road, Beach Road, East Shore Road, Fairview Avenue, Hicks Lane, Middle Neck Road, Old Mill Road, Polo Road, Station Road, and Steamboat Road.

==== Rail ====
No rail lines run through the Village of Great Neck. The nearest Long Island Rail Road station to the village is Great Neck on the Port Washington Branch.

==== Bus ====
The Village of Great Neck is served by the n57 and n58 bus routes, which are operated by Nassau Inter-County Express.

=== Utilities ===
==== Natural gas ====
National Grid USA provides natural gas to homes and businesses that are hooked up to natural gas lines in the Village of Great Neck.

==== Power ====
PSEG Long Island provides power to all homes and businesses within the Village of Great Neck, on behalf of the Long Island Power Authority.

==== Sewage ====
The Village of Great Neck is connected to (and is thus served by) the Great Neck Water Pollution Control District's sanitary sewer network.

==== Water ====
The Village of Great Neck is located within the boundaries of the Water Authority of Great Neck North, which provides the entirety of the village with water.

== Sister cities ==
The Village of Great Neck is twinned with the following cities:

- Tiberias, Israel (2002)
- Ein Qiniyye, Israel
- Herzliya, Israel
- Eli, Israel
