= Great Neck station =

Long Island Rail Road station in Nassau County, New York

Great Neck
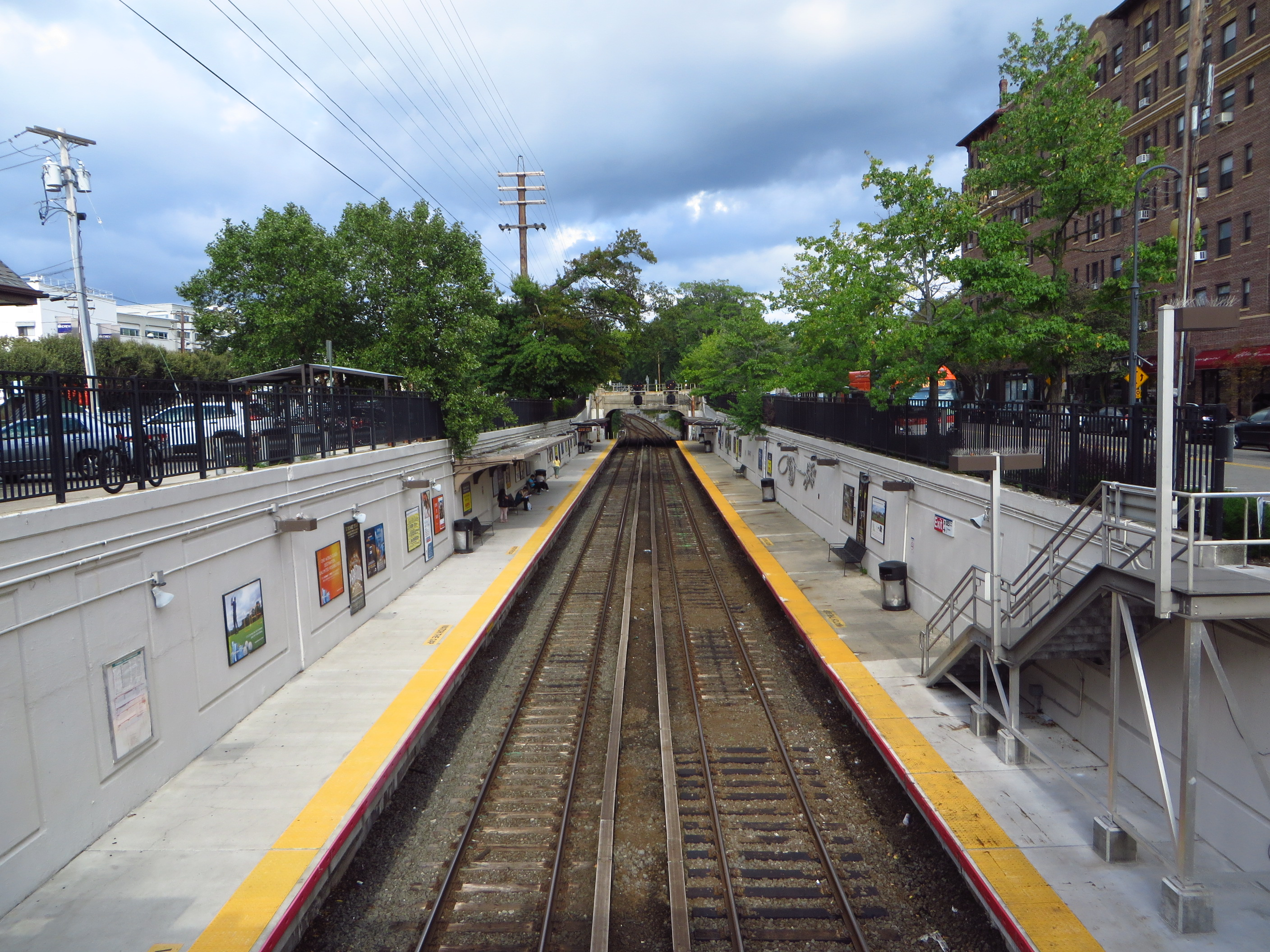
- View from the overpass, looking east

General information
- Location: Middle Neck Road & Station Plaza; Great Neck Plaza, New York
- Coordinates: 40.787235°N 73.725986°W
- Owner: Long Island Rail Road
- Line: Port Washington Branch
- Distance: 13.8 mi (22.2 km) from Long Island City
- Platforms: 2 side platforms
- Tracks: 2
- Connections: Nassau Inter-County Express: n20G, n20H, n21, n25, n26, n57, n58

Construction
- Parking: Yes (Great Neck Park District permit required)
- Cycle facilities: Yes
- Accessible: Yes

Other information
- Station code: GNK
- Fare zone: 4

History
- Opened: October 27, 1866 (NY&F)
- Closed: 1883, 1924
- Rebuilt: 1883, 1893, 1925–1934, 1990s
- Electrified: October 21, 1913; 750 V (DC) third rail
- Former names: Brookdale (1869–1872)

Passengers
- 2012—2014: 9,772
- Rank: 9 of 125

Services
Preceding station	Long Island Rail Road	Following station
Little Neck toward Penn Station or Grand Central	Port Washington Branch	Manhasset toward Port Washington
Location

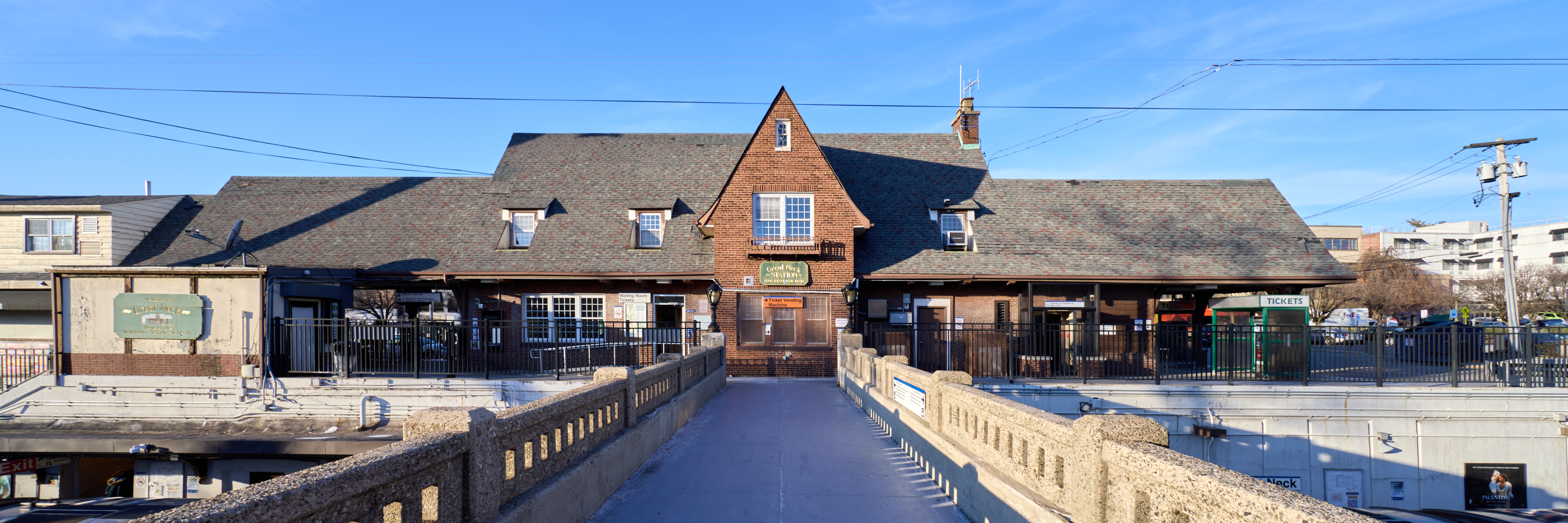
The station house

Great Neck is a station on the Long Island Rail Road's Port Washington Branch in the Village of Great Neck Plaza, Nassau County, New York. The station is located at Middle Neck Road (CR 11) and Station Plaza at Great Neck Road, 0.25 miles (0.40 km) north of Northern Boulevard (NY 25A) and 15.9 miles (25.6 km) from Pennsylvania Station in Midtown Manhattan. From just east of the station, the line becomes single track to Port Washington.

The Great Neck station is the westernmost stop on the Port Washington Branch in Nassau County.

== History ==
Great Neck was originally the terminus of the New York and Flushing Railroad when it was built in 1866 by a subsidiary called the North Shore Railroad, and called Brookdale Station. The NY&F was acquired by the Flushing and North Side Railroad in 1869, and the name was changed to Great Neck in 1872. The F&NS was consolidated into the Flushing, North Shore and Central Railroad in 1874 through a merger with the Central Railroad of Long Island, only to be leased in 1876 by the LIRR.

Though Great Neck station served as a terminal station for much of the 19th century, it was never intended to stay this way. An attempt to extend the line east from the station toward Roslyn failed in 1882. Thirteen years later, wealthy Port Washington residents persuaded the LIRR to bring the terminus to their hometown. This required the construction of the Manhasset Viaduct over the marshes at the southern end of Manhasset Bay, which was authorized by an LIRR subsidiary called the Great Neck and Port Washington Railroad. On June 23, 1898, the first LIRR train passed through Great Neck to cross the Manhasset Viaduct, Long Island's highest railroad bridge, to extend the line through Manhasset, Plandome and Port Washington. In 1924, the station was closed; it was reopened at its current location on February 26, 1925. A grade crossing elimination project then brought the tracks below ground by June 8, 1934. Elevators are on both sides. The wall along the southeastern platform has an aluminum sculpture by artist David Saunders that was installed in 2001.

In 2019, the station received enhancements and modernizations, including Wi-Fi, LCD screens, wayfinding signage, new benches, new bike racks, and charging stations, among other things, as part of a greater, systemwide initiative to upgrade stations and infrastructure.

== Station layout ==
The station has two high-level side platforms, each 10 cars long.

=== Pocket track ===
As a "readiness project" for the LIRR's East Side Access extension project to Grand Central Terminal, the MTA extended Track 2 an additional 1,200 feet (370 m) east, making it long enough to store two trainsets. This would allow the LIRR to increase the number of peak-hour trips between Great Neck and Penn Station/Grand Central Madison. It also included replacement of the original Colonial Road Bridge, built in 1897, which passes over the area of the expanded pocket track, with a new bridge with wider lanes and built to reduce noise. Also included in the project are drainage improvements to the right of way to alleviate flooding on the tracks during storms. In 2010, several homeowners in the area opposed the project, arguing that construction would harm their quality of life. Representatives from the MTA stated that the expanded pocket track would not be used for overnight train storage or maintenance.

The project was initially scheduled for completion in December 2015. Because of delays, the new bridge was installed in April 2016, and the construction of the pocket track was scheduled for completion in December 2018 at a total cost of $45.2 million. However, the completion date was again pushed back several times; as of November 2021, a tentative completion date of August 2022 was announced. Following another delay, construction of the extended pocket track would ultimately be completed in December 2022.

== In popular culture ==
The Great Neck station was referenced in The Great Gatsby as "West Egg".

== Gallery ==
Great Neck LIRR station

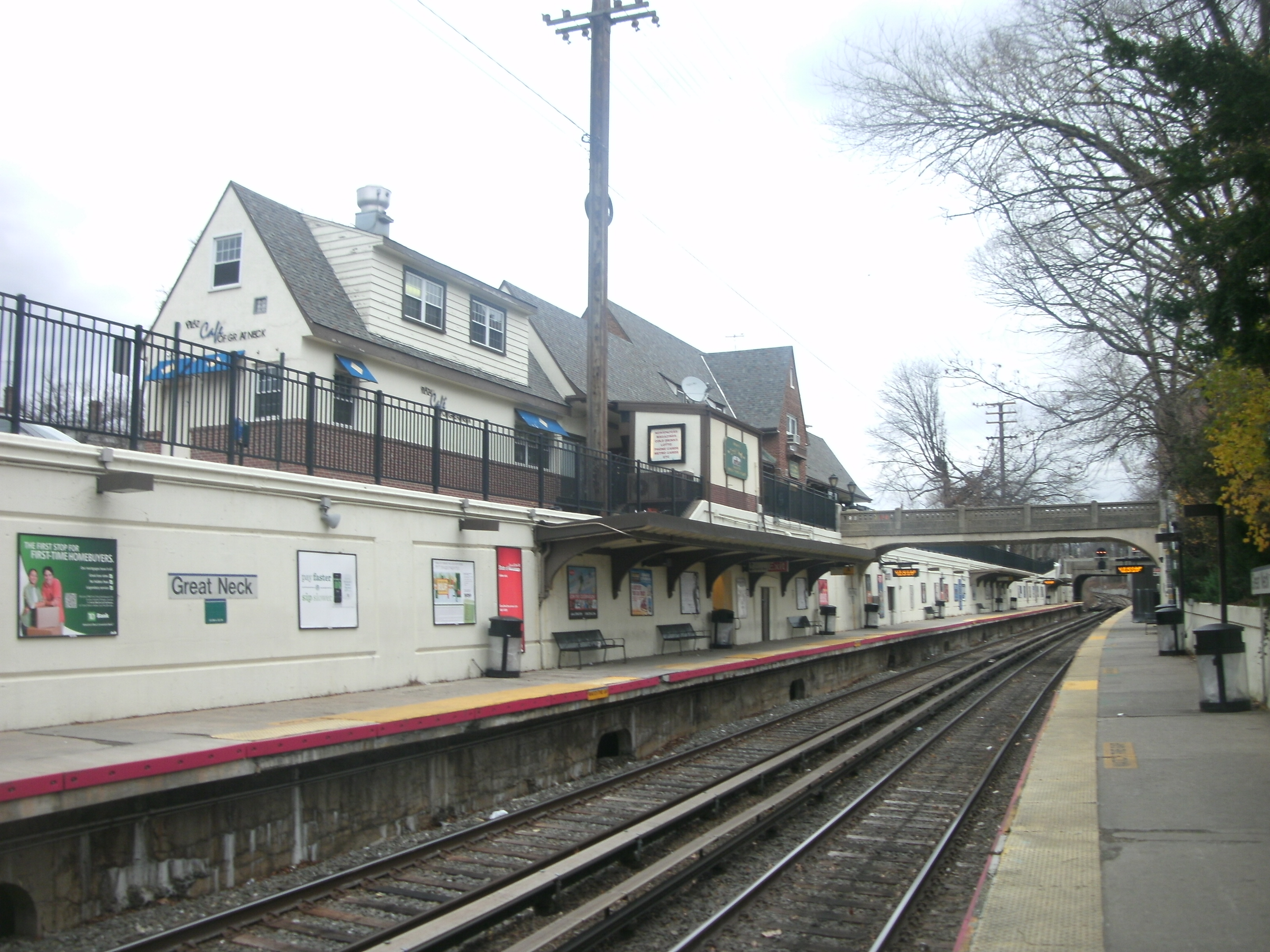
Platform level at Great Neck.

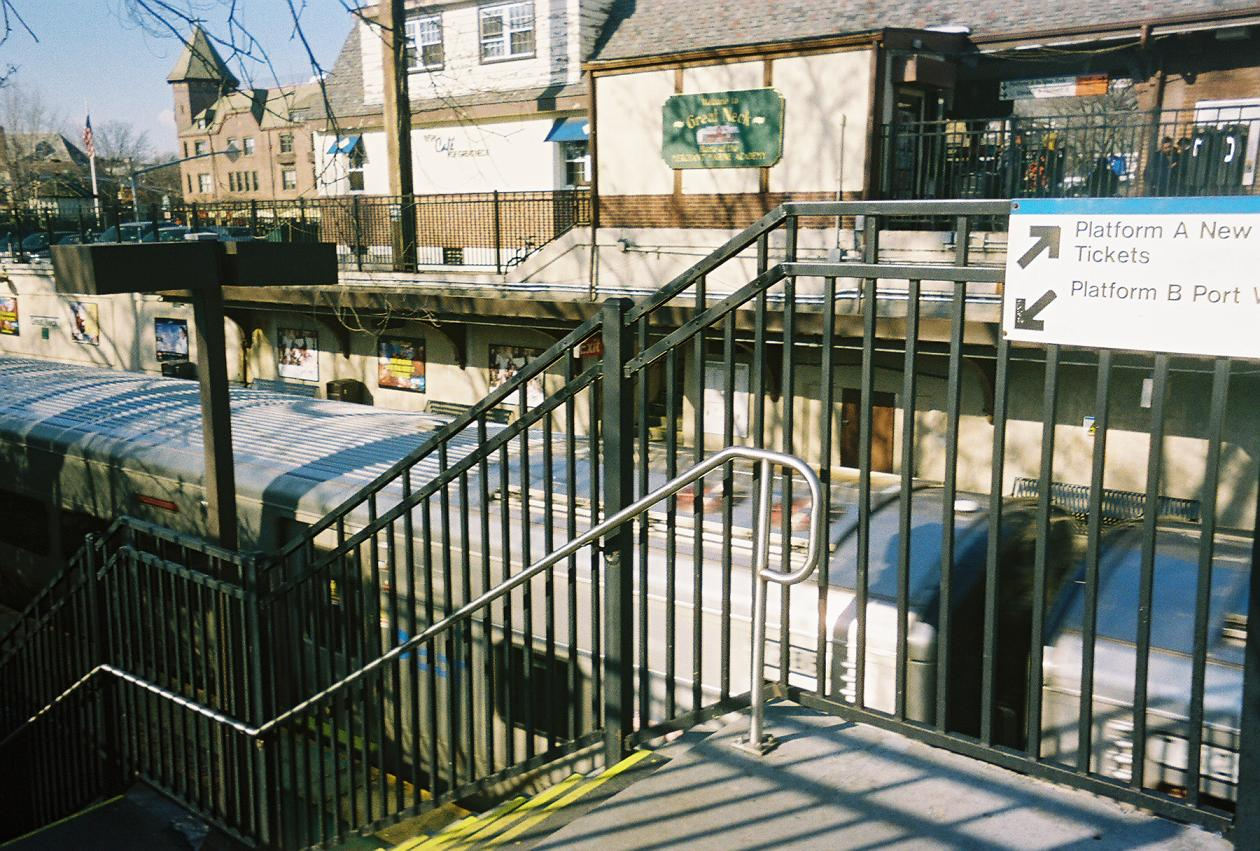
A Port Washington-bound train at the station, as seen from a staircase to Platform B.

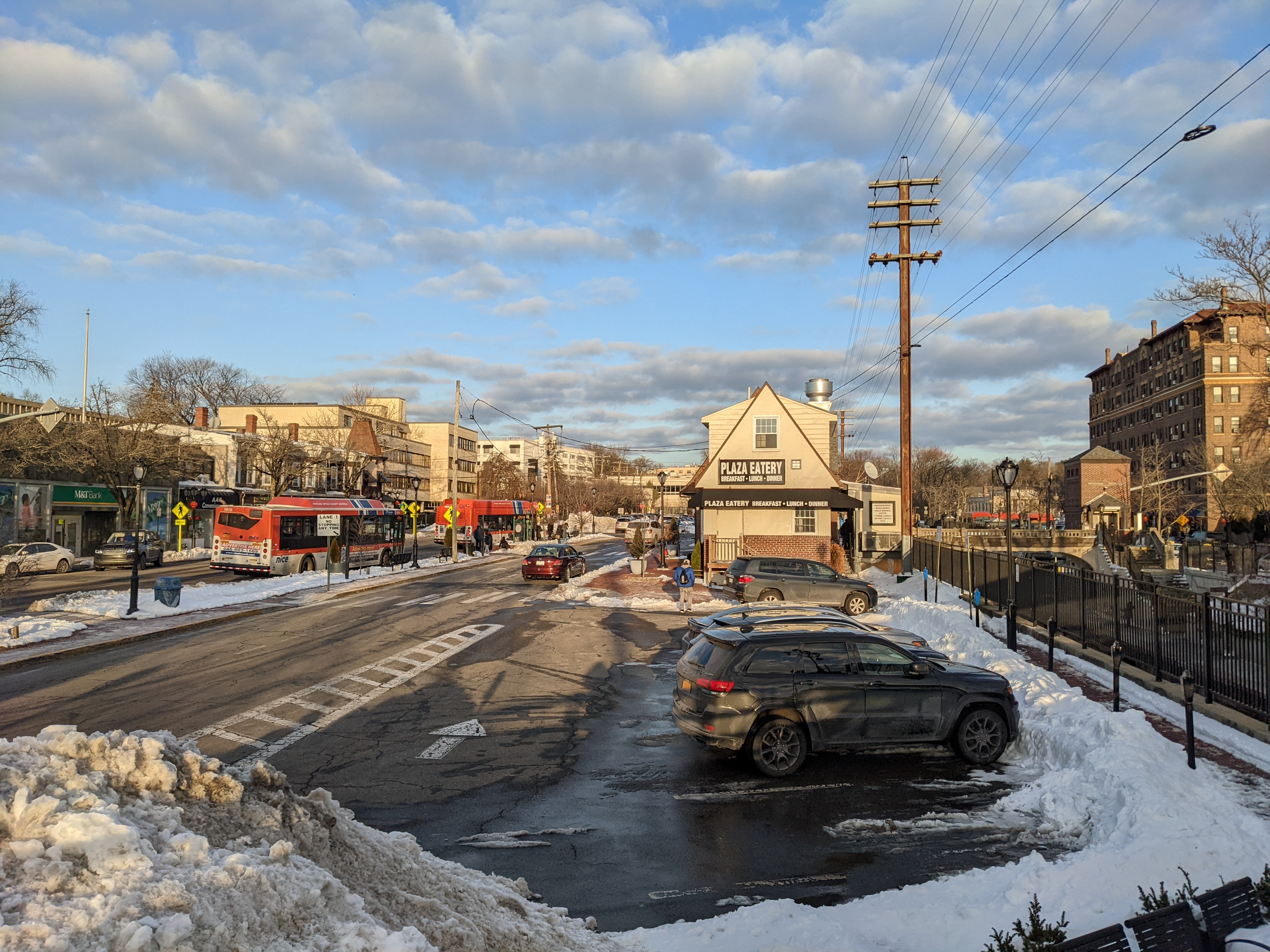
The station's parking lot, looking towards the station house.

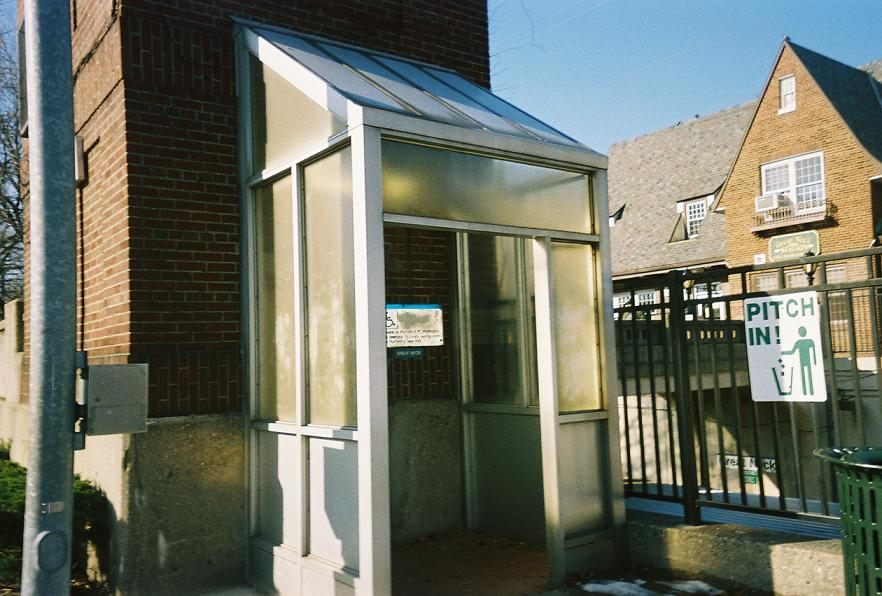
One of the elevators, as seen from street level.

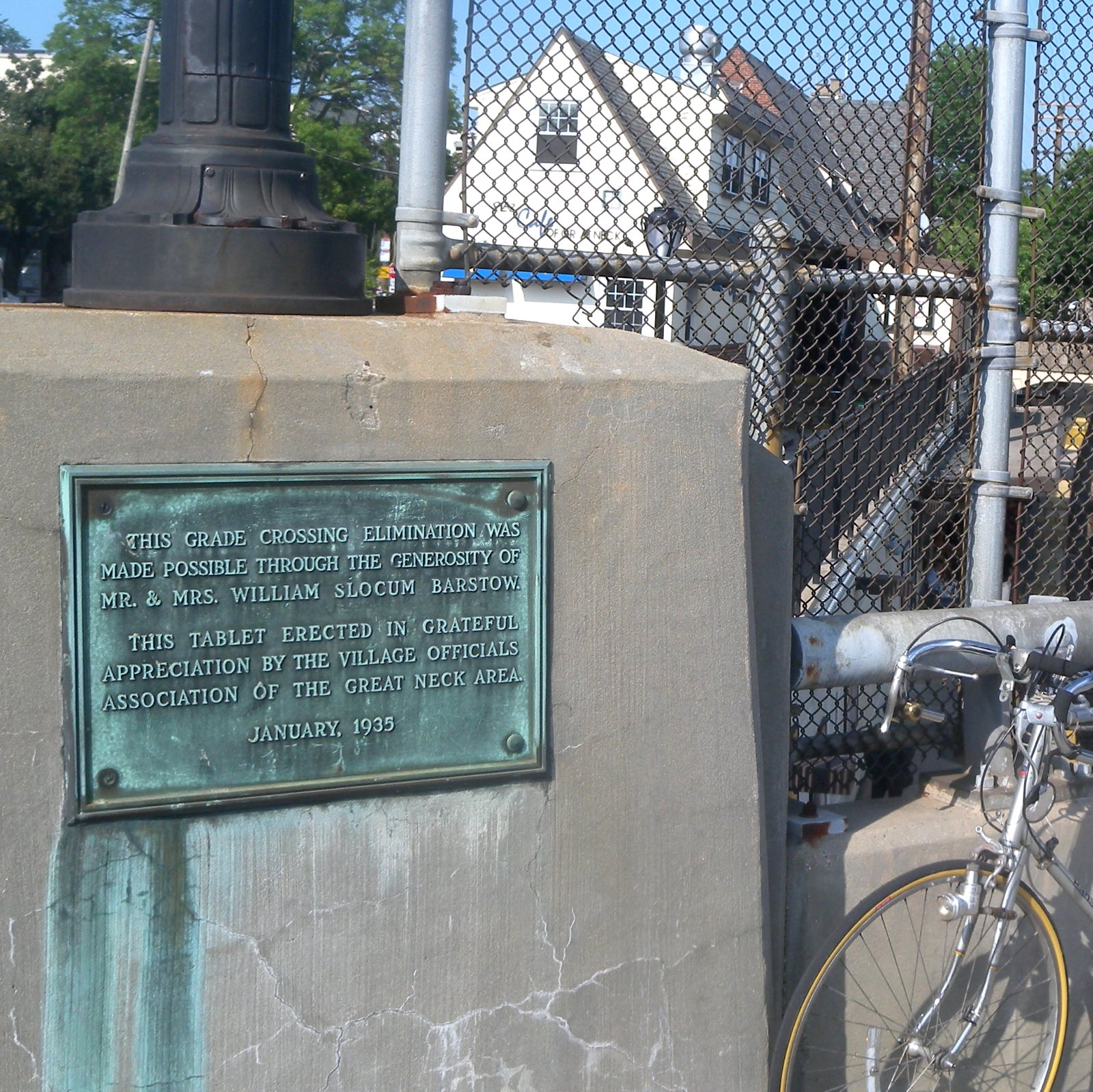
A plaque commemorating the grade crossing elimination in the Great Neck area.

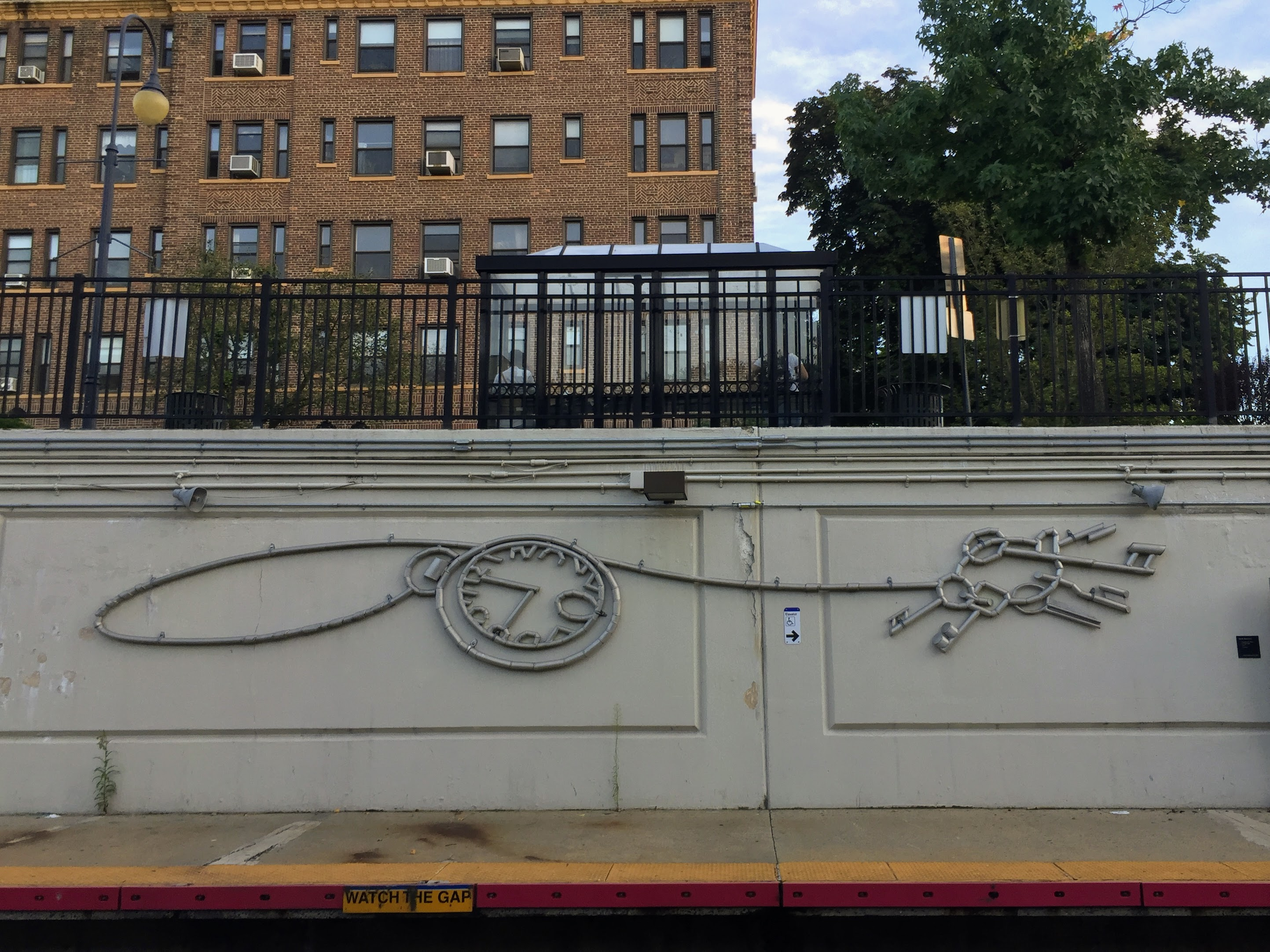
Conductor's Watch & Key Chain by David Saunders
