= Kensington, New York =

- Village
- Incorporated Village of Kensington
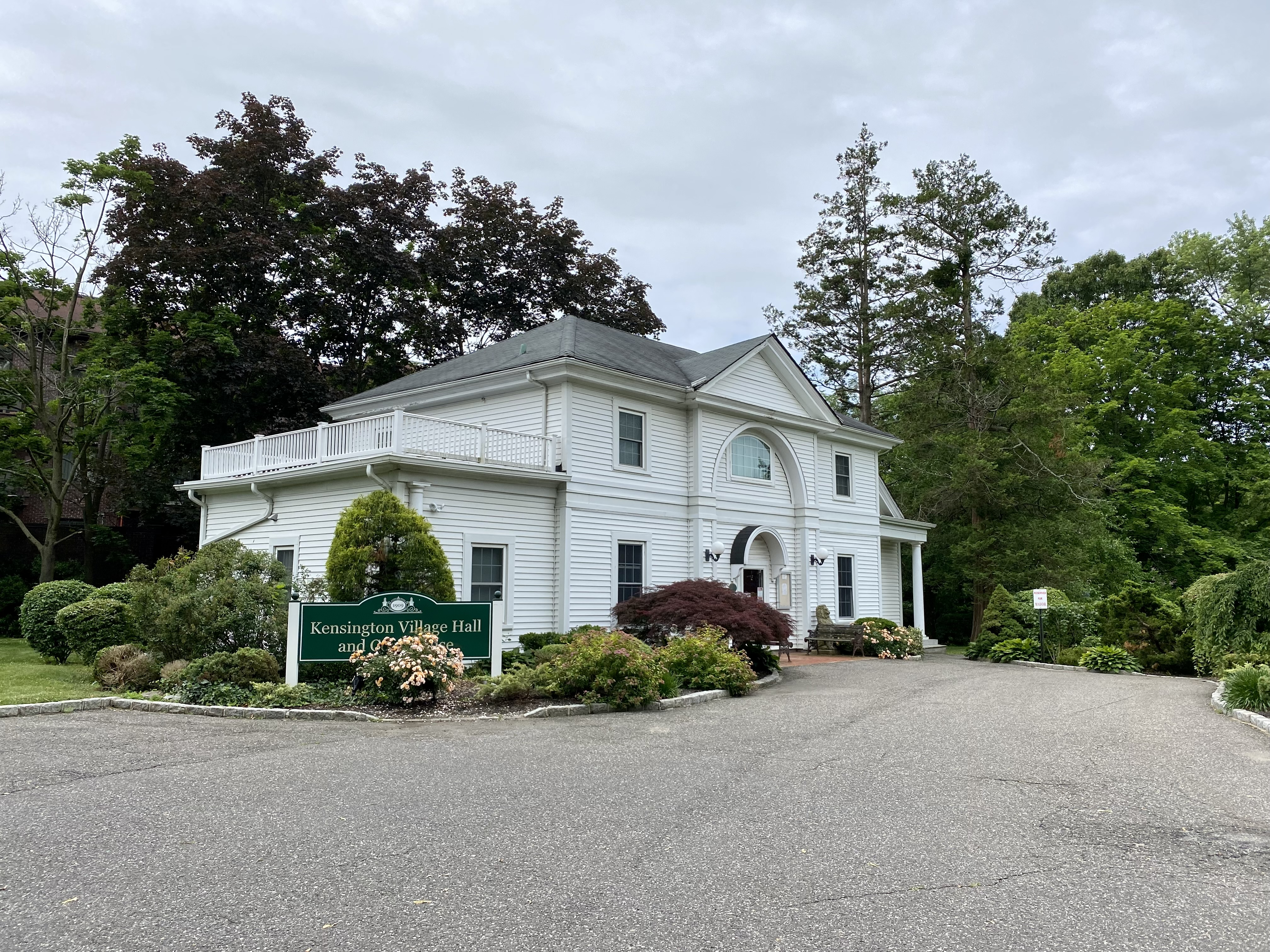
- Kensington Village Hall in 2021

- Location in Nassau County and the state of New York

- Location on Long Island Location within the state of New York
- Coordinates: 40°47′34″N 73°43′26″W
- Country: United States
- State: New York
- County: Nassau
- Town: North Hempstead
- Incorporated: November 7, 1921
- Named for: Kensington Gardens, London, England

Government
  - Mayor: Jeffrey Greener
  - Deputy Mayor: Andrew Bloom

Area
  - Total: 0.25 sq mi (0.65 km^{2})
  - Land: 0.25 sq mi (0.65 km^{2})
  - Water: 0 sq mi (0.00 km^{2})
- Elevation: 128 ft (39 m)

Population (2020)
  - Total: 1,226
  - Density: 4,822.3/sq mi (1,861.91/km^{2})
- Time zone: UTC-5 (Eastern (EST))
  - Summer (DST): UTC-4 (EDT)
- ZIP Codes: 11021, 11023 (Great Neck)
- Area codes: 516, 363
- FIPS code: 36-39309
- GNIS feature ID: 0954527
- Website: vok-ny.com

Gates flank Kensington's main entrance

Kensington is a village located within the Town of North Hempstead in Nassau County, on the North Shore of Long Island, in New York, United States. The population was 1,226 at the time of the 2020 census.

The Incorporated Village of Kensington is additionally one of several villages located on the Great Neck Peninsula.

== History ==
In the early 1900s the Rickert–Finlay Realty Company purchased the land that now consists of Kensington – the majority of which, at that time, was farmland. On that land, an upscale, planned community – known as Kensington – was erected, starting circa 1904. The development was initially established as an enclave of homes of famous celebrities.

In order to maintain the residential character of the community, a restrictive covenant was written to keep business and industry out. Furthermore, a membership corporation called the Kensington Association was initiated to take care of maintenance and police protection.

On November 7, 1921, by a unanimous vote of the residents, Kensington incorporated as a village, spurred by a desire to gain home rule powers and better and more directly control the zoning and land use matters and local services within the community.

The first village elections for officers and trustees were held on November 28, 1921, and Byron Eldred was elected unanimously as Kensington's first Mayor.

Many of Kensington's mayors have served for substantially long terms. Notable examples are Seymour Cohen, Steven Randall, and Bonnie Golub. The mayor also serves as Commissioner of Police, with the village operating its own police department.

The waterfront park was deeded to the Kensington Association in August 1915. This included a 500-foot sand beach on Manhasset Bay, miniature lakes, a boat dock, tennis courts, and one of the largest fresh water swimming pools in the United States.

In the early 2000s, Kensington was recognized as one of the safest places to live in the United States.

In 2017, Niche.com ranked Kensington #1 in its lists of both the "Best Places to Live in New York" and the "Best Suburbs to Live in New York".

=== Etymology ===
Kensington was named after London's Kensington Gardens, and the entrance gates at the main entrance to the village were modeled after Kensington Garden's gates.

== Geography ==
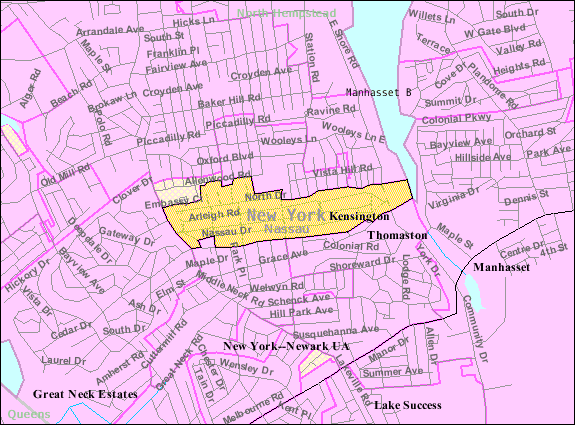
U.S. Census map of Kensington

According to the United States Census Bureau, the village has a total area of 0.25 square miles (0.65 km^{2}), all land.

Kensington is located within the Manhasset Bay Watershed at its west end, while the eastern half of the village is within the Little Neck Bay Watershed. Both of these watersheds are, in turn. located within the larger Long Island Sound/Atlantic Ocean Watershed.

=== Topography ===
Like the rest of Long Island's North Shore, Kensington is situated on a terminal moraine, known as the Harbor Hill Moraine. This moraine was formed by glaciers during the Wisconsin Glacial Episode, and is named for Harbor Hill in Roslyn; Harbor Hill is the highest geographic point in Nassau County.

According to the United States Environmental Protection Agency and the United States Geological Survey, the highest point in Kensington is located south of Nassau Drive and east of Gilchrest Road along the Kensington–Thomaston border, at approximately 140–150 feet (43–46 m), and the lowest point is Manhasset Bay, which is at sea level.

=== Climate ===
Kensington features a humid subtropical climate (Cfa) under the Köppen climate classification and is located near the transitional zone between humid subtropical and humid continental (Dfa) climates. Accordingly, the village experiences hot, humid summers and cold winters, and experiences precipitation throughout the entirety of the year.

Climate data for Kensington, New York
Month	Jan	Feb	Mar	Apr	May	Jun	Jul	Aug	Sep	Oct	Nov	Dec	Year
Record high °F (°C)	71 (22)	73 (23)	87 (31)	94 (34)	96 (36)	101 (38)	108 (42)	105 (41)	97 (36)	89 (32)	83 (28)	76 (24)	108 (42)
Mean daily maximum °F (°C)	40.4 (4.7)	42.9 (6.1)	51.1 (10.6)	61.2 (16.2)	70.6 (21.4)	79.6 (26.4)	84.5 (29.2)	83.3 (28.5)	76.0 (24.4)	65.4 (18.6)	55.7 (13.2)	45.1 (7.3)	63.0 (17.2)
Daily mean °F (°C)	33.4 (0.8)	35.0 (1.7)	42.0 (5.6)	51.8 (11.0)	60.8 (16.0)	70.1 (21.2)	75.2 (24.0)	74.1 (23.4)	67.2 (19.6)	56.5 (13.6)	47.8 (8.8)	38.2 (3.4)	54.3 (12.4)
Mean daily minimum °F (°C)	26.4 (−3.1)	27.1 (−2.7)	33.5 (0.8)	42.4 (5.8)	51.0 (10.6)	60.6 (15.9)	65.8 (18.8)	65.0 (18.3)	58.3 (14.6)	47.6 (8.7)	39.9 (4.4)	31.2 (−0.4)	45.7 (7.6)
Record low °F (°C)	−4 (−20)	−5 (−21)	5 (−15)	13 (−11)	34 (1)	43 (6)	50 (10)	46 (8)	38 (3)	27 (−3)	18 (−8)	−2 (−19)	−5 (−21)
Average precipitation inches (mm)	3.56 (90)	2.87 (73)	4.47 (114)	3.85 (98)	3.23 (82)	3.54 (90)	3.97 (101)	4.26 (108)	4.31 (109)	4.08 (104)	3.18 (81)	3.99 (101)	45.31 (1,151)
Average snowfall inches (cm)	5.5 (14)	7.8 (20)	3.7 (9.4)	0.3 (0.76)	0 (0)	0 (0)	0 (0)	0 (0)	0 (0)	0 (0)	0.2 (0.51)	5.7 (14)	23.2 (58.67)
Average relative humidity (%)	73	75	72	72	75	74	73	71	73	73	71	75	73
Mean monthly sunshine hours	177	153	172	167	202	213	237	241	215	190	210	171	2,348
Average ultraviolet index	2	2	2	3	5	6	6	6	5	3	2	2	4
Source: NOAA; Weather Atlas; The Weather Channel

==== Plant zone ====
According to the United States Department of Agriculture (USDA), the village is located within hardiness zone 7b.

== Demographics ==
Historical population
Census	Pop.	Note	%±
1930	824		—
1940	933		13.2%
1950	978		4.8%
1960	1,166		19.2%
1970	1,402		20.2%
1980	1,132		−19.3%
1990	1,104		−2.5%
2000	1,209		9.5%
2010	1,161		−4.0%
2020	1,226		5.6%
U.S. Decennial Census

=== Racial and ethnic composition ===
Kensington village, New York – Racial and ethnic composition Note: the US Census treats Hispanic/Latino as an ethnic category. This table excludes Latinos from the racial categories and assigns them to a separate category. Hispanics/Latinos may be of any race.
Race / Ethnicity (NH = Non-Hispanic)	Pop 2000	Pop 2010	Pop 2020	% 2000	% 2010	% 2020
White alone (NH)	1,079	988	877	89.25%	85.10%	71.53%
Black or African American alone (NH)	8	8	4	0.66%	0.69%	0.33%
Native American or Alaska Native alone (NH)	0	1	1	0.00%	0.09%	0.08%
Asian alone (NH)	60	101	282	4.96%	8.70%	23.00%
Native Hawaiian or Pacific Islander alone (NH)	0	0	1	0.00%	0.00%	0.08%
Other race alone (NH)	0	2	8	0.00%	0.17%	0.65%
Mixed race or Multiracial (NH)	14	35	38	1.16%	3.01%	3.10%
Hispanic or Latino (any race)	48	26	15	3.97%	2.24%	1.22%
Total	1,209	1,161	1,226	100.00%	100.00%	100.00%

=== 2000 census ===
As of the census of 2000, there were 1,209 people, 424 households, and 339 families residing in the village. The population density was 4,752.1 inhabitants per square mile (1,834.8/km^{2}). There were 447 housing units at an average density of 1,757.0 per square mile (678.4/km^{2}). The racial & ethnic makeup of the village was 91.89% White, 0.66% African American, 4.96% Asian, 1.32% from other ethnicities and/or ethnic groups, and 1.16% from two or more races. Hispanic or Latino of any race were 3.97% of the population.

There were 424 households, out of which 38.0% had children under the age of 18 living with them, 74.5% were married couples living together, 4.2% had a female householder with no husband present, and 20.0% were non-families. 18.9% of all households were made up of individuals, and 16.5% had someone living alone who was 65 years of age or older. The average household size was 2.85 and the average family size was 3.27.

In the village, the population was spread out, with 27.2% under the age of 18, 4.9% from 18 to 24, 18.4% from 25 to 44, 28.4% from 45 to 64, and 21.1% who were 65 years of age or older. The median age was 45 years. For every 100 females, there were 90.7 males. For every 100 females age 18 and over, there were 84.9 males.

The median income for a household in the village was $115,916, and the median income for a family was $133,235. Males had a median income of $100,000 versus $62,500 for females. The per capita income for the village was $59,183. About 0.9% of families and 1.2% of the population were below the poverty line, including 1.5% of those under age 18 and none of those age 65 or over.

As per the United States 2000 Census, Kensington had the highest percentage of Israeli American residents among all communities in the United States, at 6.2%.

== Government ==
=== Village government ===
The Village of Kensington is governed by the five-member Village of Kensington Board of Trustees, which consists of a mayor and four village trustees. The mayor and trustees are elected at-large by residents, and the mayor appoints one trustee annually to additionally serve as deputy mayor.

As of June 2026, the Mayor of Kensington is Jeffrey Greener, the Deputy Mayor is Andrew Bloom, and the Village Trustees are Ronen Abergel, Andrew Bloom, Linda Cheung, and Carey Ye.

==== Police department ====
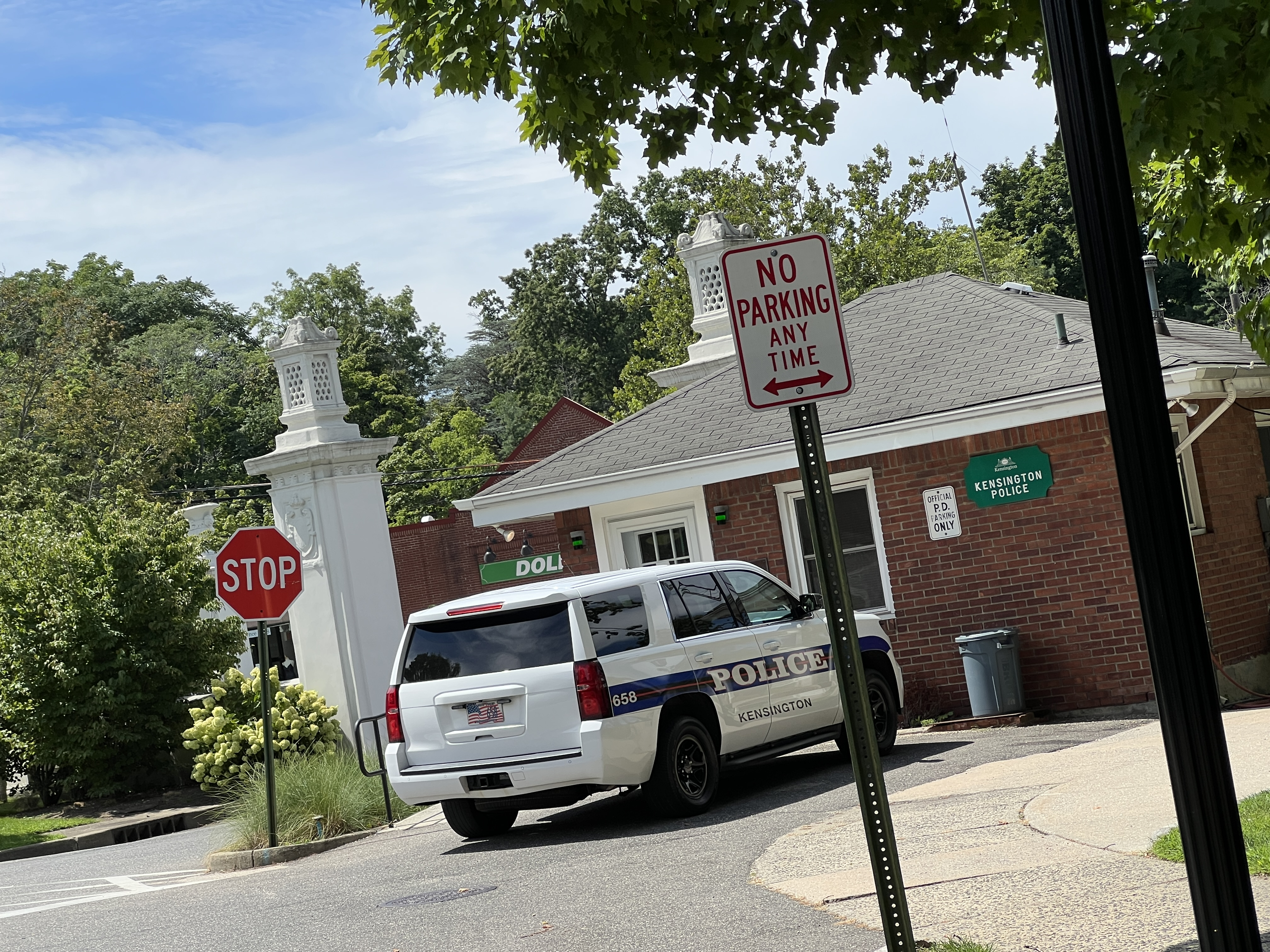
The Kensington Police Department's station and one of its vehicles in 2022

The Village of Kensington operates its own police department, known as the Kensington Police Department.

As of June 2026, the Police Commissioner of Kensington is Jeffrey Greener.

=== Representation in higher government ===
On the town level, Kensington is located in the Town of North Hempstead's 5th council district, which as of June 2026 is represented in the North Hempstead Town Council by Yaron Levy (R–Harbor Hills).

On the county level, Kensington is located in Nassau County's 10th Legislative district, which as of June 2026 is represented in the Nassau County Legislature by Mazi Melesa Pilip (R–Great Neck).

On the state level, Kensington is located within the New York State Assembly's 16th State Assembly district and the New York State Senate's 7th State Senate district, which as of June 2026 are represented by Daniel J. Norber (R–Great Neck) and Jack M. Martins (R–Old Westbury), respectively.

On the federal level, Kensington is located in New York's 3rd congressional district, which as of June 2026 is represented by Thomas R. Suozzi (D–Glen Cove). Like the rest of New York, it is represented in the United States Senate by Charles E. Schumer (D) and Kirsten E. Gillibrand (D).

=== Politics ===
In the 2024 U.S. presidential election, the majority of Kensington voters voted for Donald J. Trump (R).

== Education ==
=== School districts ===
The majority of Kensington is located within the boundaries of (and is thus served by) the Great Neck Union Free School District, while the easternmost section of the village is located within the Manhasset Union Free School District—although no homes are located within the boundaries of the Manhasset school district. Accordingly, all children who reside within Kensington and attend public school go to Great Neck's schools.

=== Library districts ===
The majority of Kensington is located within the boundaries of (and is thus served by) the Great Neck Library District, although the easternmost section of the village is located within the Manhasset Library District (though all homes are in the Great Neck part of Kensington). The boundaries of both library districts within the village roughly correspond with those of the two school districts

== Notable people ==
- Anna M. Kaplan – Former New York State Senator for New York's 7th State Senate district; former Town of North Hempstead Councilwoman.
- Irwin J. Landes – Former New York State Assemblyman for New York's 16th State Assembly district.
- Lester L. Wolff – Former United States Congressman for NY-3 and NY-6.

== See also ==
- List of municipalities in New York
- Thomaston, New York
