= Saddle Rock, New York =

- Village
- Incorporated Village of Saddle Rock
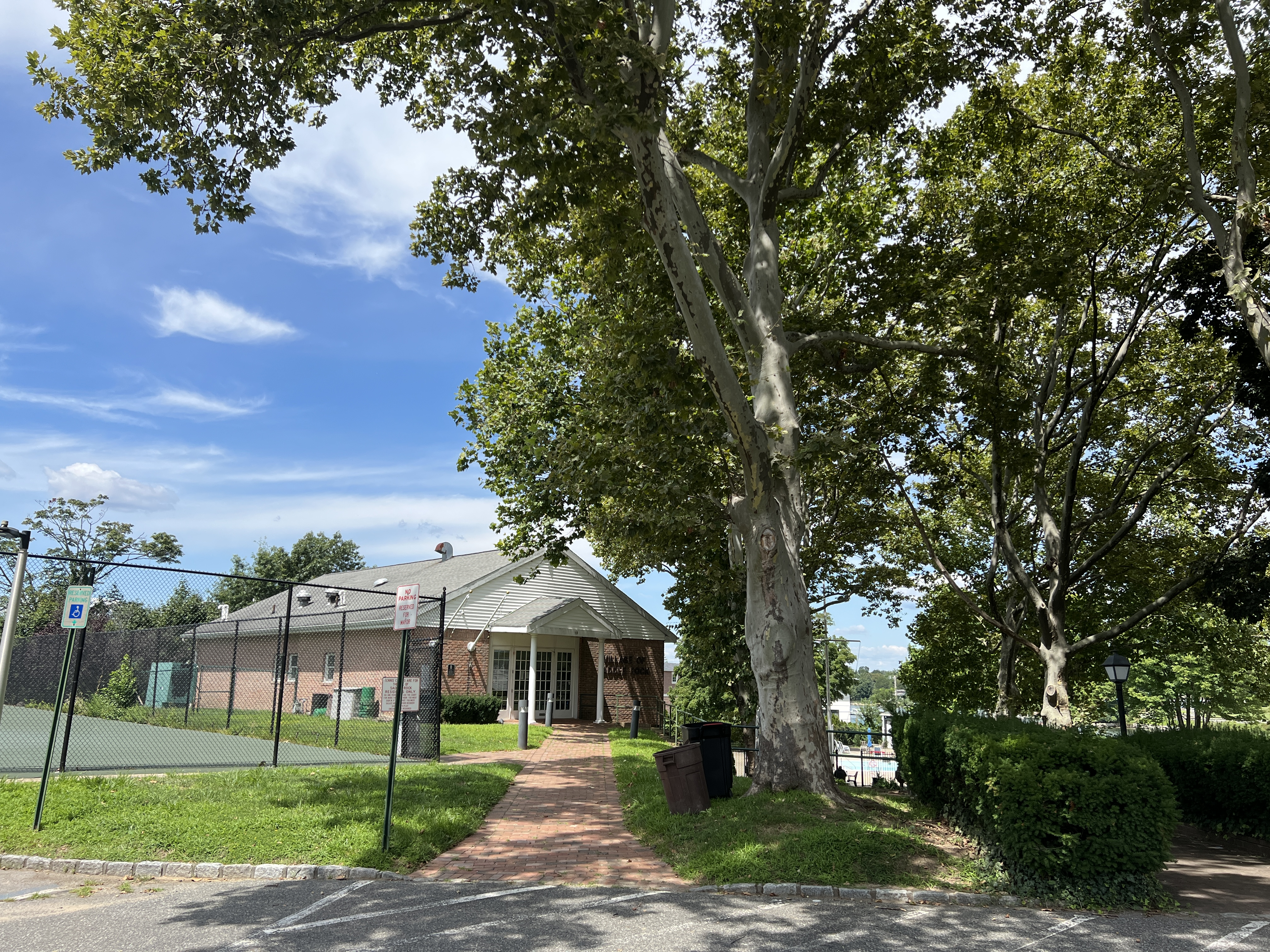
- Saddle Rock Village Hall and Park in 2022
- Motto: "In God We Trust"
- Location in Nassau County and the state of New York

- Location on Long Island Location within the state of New York
- Coordinates: 40°47′40″N 73°44′56″W
- Country: United States
- State: New York
- County: Nassau
- Town: North Hempstead
- Incorporated: 1911
- Named for: Saddle Rock

Government
  - Mayor: Kambiz Akhavan
  - Deputy Mayor: Hal Chadow

Area
  - Total: 0.27 sq mi (0.71 km^{2})
  - Land: 0.25 sq mi (0.65 km^{2})
  - Water: 0.023 sq mi (0.06 km^{2})
- Elevation: 79 ft (24 m)

Population (2020)
  - Total: 989
  - Density: 3,914.3/sq mi (1,511.31/km^{2})
- Time zone: UTC-5 (Eastern (EST))
  - Summer (DST): UTC-4 (EDT)
- ZIP Code: 11023 (Great Neck)
- Area codes: 516, 363
- FIPS code: 36-64430
- GNIS feature ID: 0963208
- Website: saddlerockny.gov

Saddle Rock is a village on the Great Neck Peninsula in the Town of North Hempstead, in Nassau County, on the North Shore of Long Island, in New York, United States. The population was 989 at the time of the 2020 census.

== History ==
The area now consisting of the Village of Saddle Rock was, like the rest of the Great Neck Peninsula, originally inhabited by the Matinecock Native Americans. The first European settlers arrived in the area during the 17th century. In 1658, during these early years of European settlement, an offshore boulder that gives the appearance of a saddle, was first noted on maps, leading to the name "Saddle Rock" being used to describe the area.

The village is also home to a historic mill. Officially known as the Saddle Rock Grist Mill, it was built circa 1700 and is located inside a small cove that opens onto Little Neck Bay off Long Island Sound. The mill is listed in the National Register of Historic Places and is the oldest tidal grist mill in the United States. The mill was operated as a living museum from the 1970’s to 2005. The mill is now owned by Nassau County, but the museum has been closed since 2005 and is in need of repairs. The mill was restored to its mid-19th-century appearance in the 1950’s and again in the 1970’s and is located on Grist Mill Lane.

The first Mayor of Saddle Rock was Roswell Eldridge, who was appointed "Acting Mayor" after he had incorporated his own private estate as the Village of Saddle Rock in 1911.

In 1926, Eldridge's wife, Louise Udall Skidmore Eldridge, officially became the first female Mayor of Saddle Rock, and reportedly the first female Mayor in the state of New York. Louise Eldridge served as Mayor from 1926 until her death in 1947. She was also the last private individual to own the grist mill.

In 2012, the incumbent Mayor, Dan Levy, had been assaulted in Saddle Rock Village Hall following the village's October board meeting by a former Trustee candidate who had lost his election; Levy suffered a broken arm and left shoulder, and the suspect was arrested after he turned himself in.

=== 2026 election controversy ===
In 2026, the incumbent mayor – Dan Levy – and the entire slate were unable to appear on that year's election ballot after Levy and two witnesses failed to sign their names on the election forms as required, leading to the Nassau County Board of Elections needing to invalidate the petitions. About the same time, concerns over government transparency arose, and – in tandem both the ballot issues and with a longstanding controversy involving the handling of requests from a minyan within the village – resulted in a contested election. Upon being disqualified, Levy announced that he would not seek re-election or otherwise run on a write-in campaign; the two trustees who ran and were disqualified with him, meanwhile, would still run as write-ins. During that year's village election on March 18, Levy had become subject to additional controversy, when Nassau County elections officers revealed that Levy altered the village's voter roll; Levy asserted that the alterations he made involved crossing out the names of deceased voters, "to make sure dead people don't vote." Ultimately, the residents of Saddle Rock elected Kambiz Akhavan – the Friendly Neighbors Party candidate – to serve as Levy's successor as Mayor. Akhavan's opponent – incumbent Trustee Robert Kraus – would retain his seat as Village Trustee.

=== Etymology ===
The Village of Saddle Rock is so named for Saddle Rock – the offshore boulder that gives the appearance of a saddle that the European settlers in the area first depicted on maps in 1658.

== Geography ==
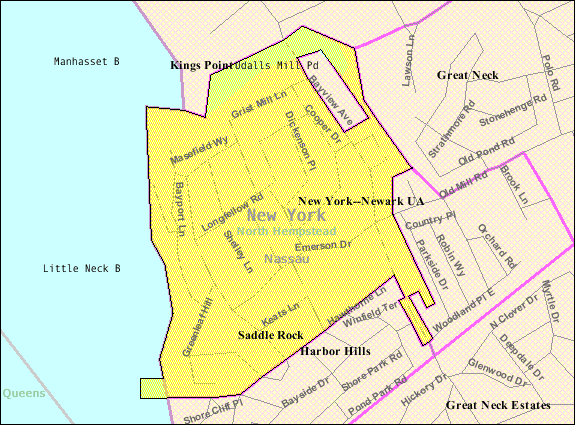
U.S. Census map of Saddle Rock

According to the United States Census Bureau, the village has a total area of 0.3 square miles (0.78 km^{2}), of which 0.2 square miles (0.52 km^{2}) is land and 0.04 square miles (0.10 km^{2}), or 7.69%, is water.

=== Drainage ===
According to the United States Geological Survey and the United States Environmental Protection Agency, Saddle Rock is located within the Little Neck Bay Watershed, which itself is located within the larger Long Island Sound/Atlantic Ocean Watershed.

=== Climate ===
The Village of Saddle Rock features a humid subtropical climate (Cfa) under the Köppen climate classification. As such, the village experiences hot, humid summers and cold winters, and experiences precipitation throughout the entirety of the year.

== Demographics ==
Historical population
Census	Pop.	Note	%±
1920	71		—
1930	74		4.2%
1940	69		−6.8%
1950	33		−52.2%
1960	1,109		3,260.6%
1970	895		−19.3%
1980	921		2.9%
1990	832		−9.7%
2000	791		−4.9%
2010	830		4.9%
2020	989		19.2%
U.S. Decennial Census

=== 2020 census ===
As of the 2020 census, there were 989 people residing in the village.

=== 2010 census ===
As of the 2010 census, there were 830 people residing in the village.

=== Census 2000 ===
As of the census of 2000, there were 791 people, 265 households, and 236 families residing in the village. The population density was 3,239.8 inhabitants per square mile (1,250.9/km^{2}). There were 275 housing units at an average density of 1,126.4 per square mile (434.9/km^{2}). The racial makeup of the village was 90.39% White, 0.76% African American, 6.19% Asian, 1.01% from other races, and 1.64% from two or more races. Hispanic or Latino of any race were 1.77% of the population.

Ancestries: Russian (10.5%), United States (9.7%), Arab (9.4%), Polish (5.8%), Hungarian (2.0%), Lithuanian (1.9%).

There were 265 households, out of which 34.7% had children under the age of 18 living with them, 81.5% were married couples living together, 3.8% had a female householder with no husband present, and 10.9% were non-families. 8.7% of all households were made up of individuals, and 7.5% had someone living alone who was 65 years of age or older. The average household size was 2.98 and the average family size was 3.15.

In the village, the population was spread out, with 23.1% under the age of 18, 7.6% from 18 to 24, 15.7% from 25 to 44, 33.6% from 45 to 64, and 20.0% who were 65 years of age or older. The median age was 48 years. For every 100 females, there were 95.3 males. For every 100 females age 18 and over, there were 92.4 males.

The median income for a household in the village was $125,630, and the median income for a family was $137,962. Males had a median income of $92,073 versus $40,625 for females. The per capita income for the village was $63,242. About 3.4% of families and 3.0% of the population were below the poverty line, including 4.8% of those under age 18 and 4.0% of those age 65 or over.

== Government ==
=== Village government ===
As of April 2026, the Mayor of Saddle Rock is Kambiz "Eli" Akhavan, the Deputy Mayor is Dr. Hal Chadow, and the Village Trustees are Kousha Askari, Robert Kraus, and Dr. Joshua Rabanipour. The mayor, deputy mayor, and trustee positions are all unpaid, volunteer positions.

The following is a list of the Mayors of Saddle Rock', from 1911 to present:

Mayors of Saddle Rock:
Mayor's name	Year(s) in office
Roswell Eldridge	1911–1926
Louise Udall Skidmore Eldridge	1926–1947
Henry E. Treadwell	1947–1950
Samuel Berger	1950–1951
George Wolf	1951–1952
Jacob W. Friedman	1952–1954
Harold I. Glasser	1954–1962
Jack I. Antokal	1962–1968
Emanuel R. Bachner	1968–1980
Leonard Eisenberg	1980–1985
Allen Michelson	1985–1991
J. Leonard Samansky	1991–2011
Dr. Dan Levy	2011–2026
Kambiz "Eli" Akhavan	2026–present

=== Representation in higher government ===
==== Town representation ====
Saddle Rock is located in the Town of North Hempstead's 5th council district, which as of March 2026 is represented on the North Hempstead Town Council by Yaron Levy (R–Harbor Hills).

==== Nassau County representation ====
Saddle Rock is located in Nassau County's 10th Legislative district, which as of March 2026 is represented in the Nassau County Legislature by Mazi Melesa Pilip (R–Great Neck).

==== New York State representation ====
===== New York State Assembly =====
Saddle Rock is located in the New York State Assembly's 16th State Assembly district, which as of March 2026 is represented by Daniel J. Norber (R–Great Neck).

===== New York State Senate =====
Saddle Rock is located in the New York State Senate's 7th State Senate district, which as of March 2026 is represented by Jack M. Martins (R–Old Westbury).

==== Federal representation ====
===== United States Congress =====
Saddle Rock is located in New York's 3rd congressional district, which as of March 2026 is represented in the United States Congress by Thomas R. Suozzi (D–Glen Cove).

===== United States Senate =====
Like the rest of New York, Saddle Rock is represented in the United States Senate by Charles Schumer (D) and Kirsten Gillibrand (D).

=== Politics ===
In the 2024 U.S. presidential election, the majority of Saddle Rock voters voted for Donald Trump (R).

== Education ==
=== School district ===
Saddle Rock is located entirely within the boundaries of the Great Neck Union Free School District. As such, all children who reside within the village and attend public schools go to Great Neck's schools.

=== Library district ===
Saddle Rock is located within the boundaries of the Great Neck Library District, which is served by the Great Neck Public Library.

== Infrastructure ==
=== Transportation ===
==== Road ====
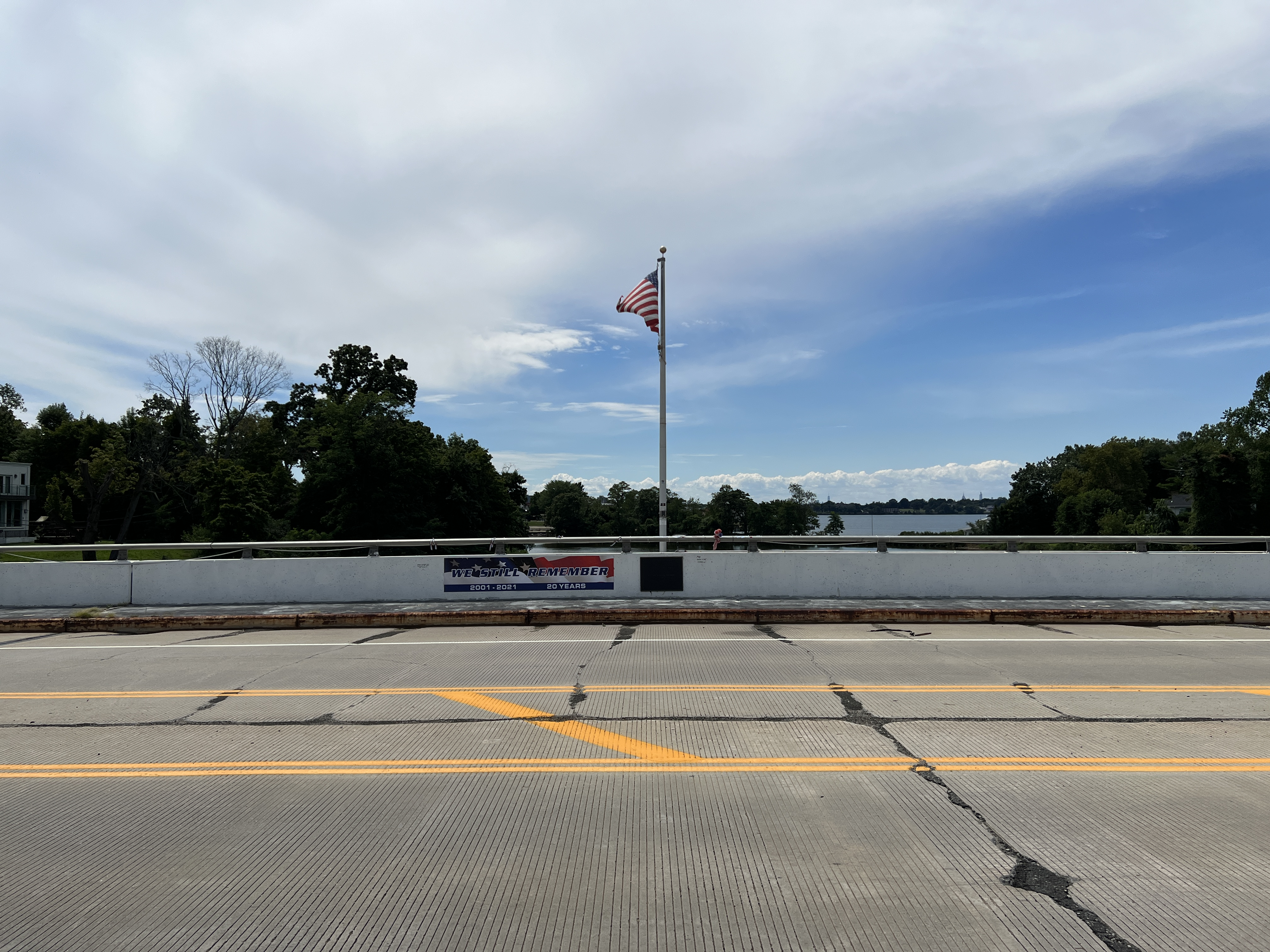
An American flag, memorial plaque, and anniversary sign on the 9-11 Memorial Bridge in Saddle Rock in 2022. One World Trade Center is visible in the distance.

Major roadways in the Village of Saddle Rock include Bayview Avenue (CR C09) and Old Mill Road (CR D78).

Additionally, the 9-11 Memorial Bridge is located within the village, connecting Bayview Avenue in Saddle Rock to West Shore Road in Kings Point.

==== Rail ====
No rail lines run through the Village of Saddle Rock. The nearest Long Island Rail Road station to the village is Great Neck on the Port Washington Branch.

==== Bus ====
The Village of Saddle Rock is served by the n57 bus route, which is operated by Nassau Inter-County Express.

=== Utilities ===
==== Natural gas ====
National Grid USA provides natural gas to homes and businesses that are hooked up to natural gas lines in the Village of Saddle Rock.

==== Power ====
PSEG Long Island provides power to all homes and businesses within the Village of Saddle Rock, on behalf of the Long Island Power Authority.

==== Sewage ====
The Village of Saddle Rock is connected to (and is thus served by) the Great Neck Water Pollution Control District's sanitary sewer network.

==== Water ====
The Village of Saddle Rock is located within the boundaries of the Water Authority of Great Neck North, which provides the entirety of the village with water.

== Landmark ==
- Saddle Rock Grist Mill – a historic grist mill listed on the National Register of Historic Places, located within the village.

== Notable person ==
- Barbara Judge – American-British lawyer and businesswoman; grew up in Saddle Rock.

== See also ==
- List of municipalities in New York
- Saddle Rock Estates – an adjacent, unincorporated hamlet and CDP which shares a portion of its name with Saddle Rock.
