= Saddle Rock Estates, New York =

- Hamlet and census-designated place
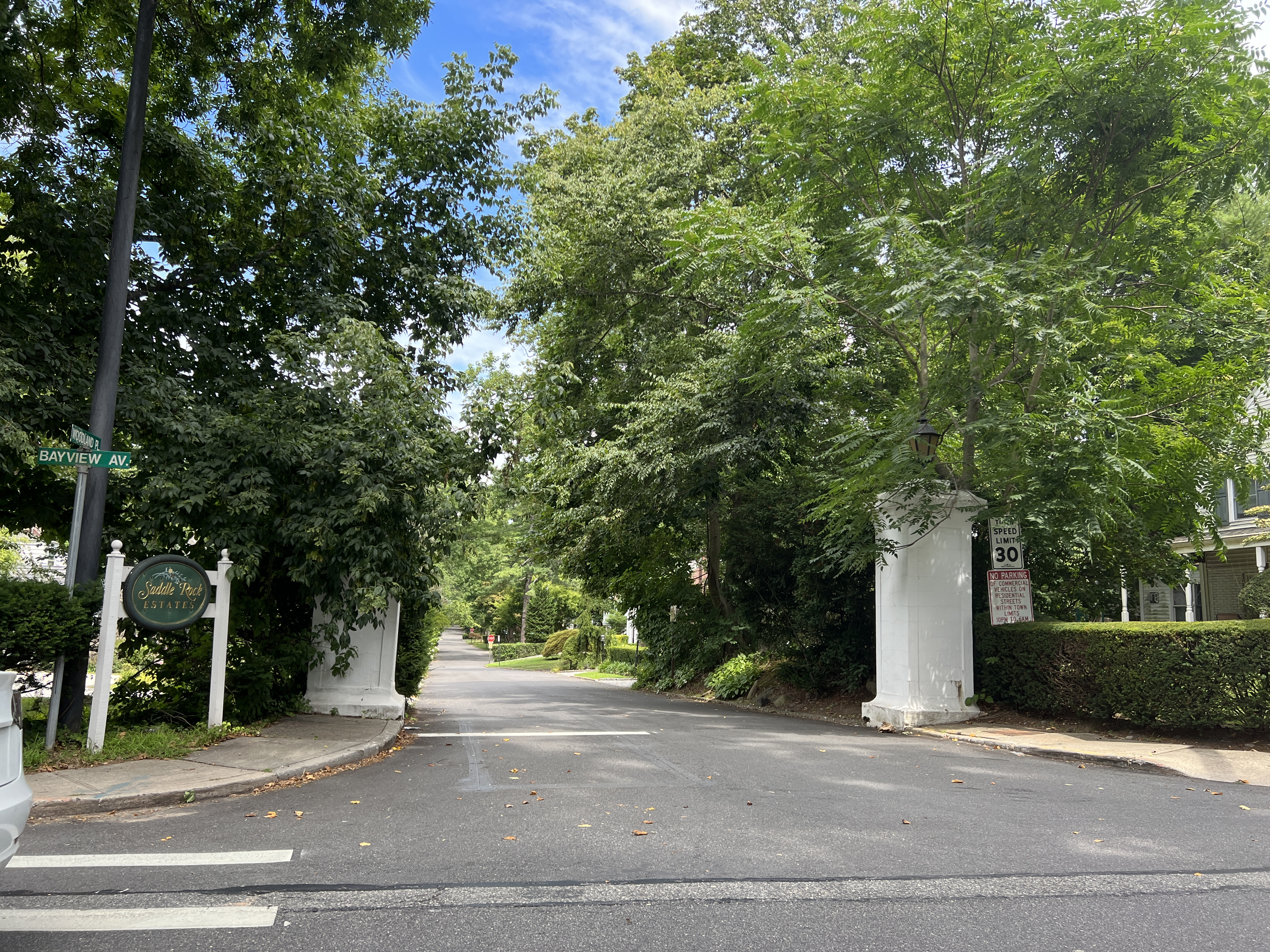
- The Woodland Place entrance to Saddle Rock Estates in 2022

- Location in Nassau County and the state of New York

- Location on Long Island Location within the state of New York
- Coordinates: 40°47′37″N 73°44′31″W
- Country: United States
- State: New York
- County: Nassau
- Town: North Hempstead
- Named for: Its proximity to Saddle Rock

Area
  - Total: 0.077 sq mi (0.20 km^{2})
  - Land: 0.077 sq mi (0.20 km^{2})
  - Water: 0 sq mi (0.00 km^{2})
- Elevation: 26 ft (8 m)

Population (2020)
  - Total: 428
  - Density: 5,492.6/sq mi (2,120.71/km^{2})
- Time zone: UTC-5 (Eastern (EST))
  - Summer (DST): UTC-4 (EDT)
- ZIP Codes: 11021, 11023 (Great Neck)
- Area code: 516, 363
- FIPS code: 36-64441
- GNIS feature ID: 0963209

Saddle Rock Estates is a hamlet and census-designated place (CDP) located on the Great Neck Peninsula within the Town of North Hempstead in Nassau County, on the North Shore of Long Island, in New York, United States. The population was 428 at the time of the 2020 census.

== History ==
The name of Saddle Rock Estates reflects the fact that it is located adjacent to the Incorporated Village of Saddle Rock. However, Saddle Rock Estates has never been a part of that village, and the hamlet merely took its name from its incorporated neighbor.

In 1941, residents were successful in gaining permission to have the Great Neck Water Pollution Control District expand into their hamlet as part of an extension project. At the time, the then-proposed expansion project was estimated to cost $140,000 (1941 USD).

In the summer of 1946, the County of Nassau began work on closing the Old Mill Pond Brook and placed it into a boxed-in culvert. Residents had requested for Nassau to place the brook into a culvert since 1943, and cited that the brook often caused road washouts and basement floods.

== Geography ==
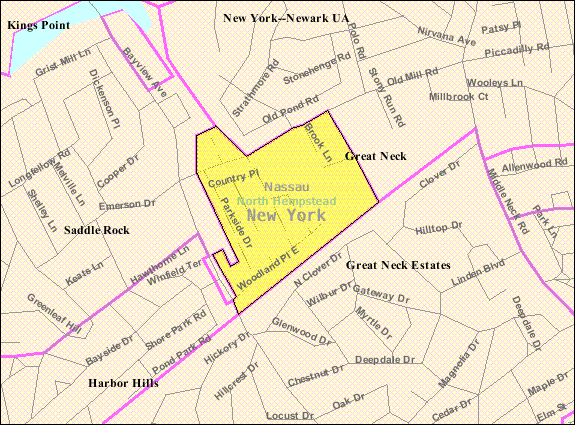
U.S. Census map of Saddle Rock Estates

According to the United States Census Bureau, the CDP has a total area of 0.1 square miles (0.26 km^{2}), all land.

== Demographics ==
Historical population
Census	Pop.	Note	%±
2000	424		—
2010	466		9.9%
2020	428		−8.2%
U.S. Decennial Census

As of the census of 2000, there were 424 people, 134 households, and 123 families residing in the CDP. The population density was 5,461.6 inhabitants per square mile (2,108.7/km^{2}). There were 139 housing units at an average density of 1,790.5 per square mile (691.3/km^{2}). The racial makeup of the CDP was 94.34% White, 1.65% African American, 1.89% Asian, and 2.12% from two or more races. Hispanic or Latino of any race were 1.18% of the population.

There were 134 households, out of which 50.7% had children under the age of 18 living with them, 82.8% were married couples living together, 6.0% had a female householder with no husband present, and 7.5% were non-families. 5.2% of all households were made up of individuals, and 1.5% had someone living alone who was 65 years of age or older. The average household size was 3.16 and the average family size was 3.26.

In the CDP, the population was spread out, with 30.9% under the age of 18, 5.2% from 18 to 24, 19.8% from 25 to 44, 30.7% from 45 to 64, and 13.4% who were 65 years of age or older. The median age was 40 years. For every 100 females, there were 99.1 males. For every 100 females age 18 and over, there were 99.3 males.

The median income for a household in the CDP was $157,231, and the median income for a family was $160,746. Males had a median income of $100,000 versus $51,250 for females. The per capita income for the CDP was $61,249. None of the population or families were below the poverty line.

== Government ==
=== Town representation ===
As Saddle Rock Estates is an unincorporated hamlet, it has no government of its own, and is instead governed directly by the Town of North Hempstead in Manhasset.

Saddle Rock Estates is located in the Town of North Hempstead's 5th district, which as of March 2026 is represented on the North Hempstead Town Council by Yaron Levy (R–Harbor Hills).

=== Representation in higher government ===
==== Nassau County representation ====
Saddle Rock Estates is located in Nassau County's 10th Legislative district, which as of January 2023 is represented in the Nassau County Legislature by Mazi Melesa Pilip (R–Great Neck).

==== New York State representation ====
===== New York State Assembly =====
Saddle Rock Estates is located in the New York State Assembly's 16th Assembly district, which as of March 2026 is represented by Daniel J. Norber (R–Great Neck).

===== New York State Senate =====
Saddle Rock Estates is located in the New York State Senate's 7th State Senate district, which as of August 2025 is represented by Jack M. Martins (R–Old Westbury).

==== Federal representation ====
===== United States Congress =====
Saddle Rock Estates is located in New York's 3rd congressional district, which as of March 2026 is represented in the United States Congress by Thomas R. Suozzi (D–Glen Cove).

===== United States Senate =====
Like the rest of New York, Saddle Rock Estates is represented in the United States Senate by Charles Schumer (D) and Kirsten Gillibrand (D).

=== Politics ===
In the 2016 U.S. presidential election, the majority of Saddle Rock Estates voters voted for Hillary Clinton (D). Donald Trump (R), meanwhile, flipped the hamlet in 2020, and received the majority of votes in Saddle Rock Estates in both the 2020 and 2024 presidential elections.

== Education ==
=== School district ===
Saddle Rock Estates is located entirely within the boundaries of the Great Neck Union Free School District. As such, all children who reside within Saddle Rock Estates and attend public schools go to Great Neck's schools.

=== Library district ===
Saddle Rock Estates is located within the boundaries of the Great Neck Library District.

== See also ==
- Saddle Rock, New York
