= Harbor Hills, New York =

- Hamlet and census-designated place
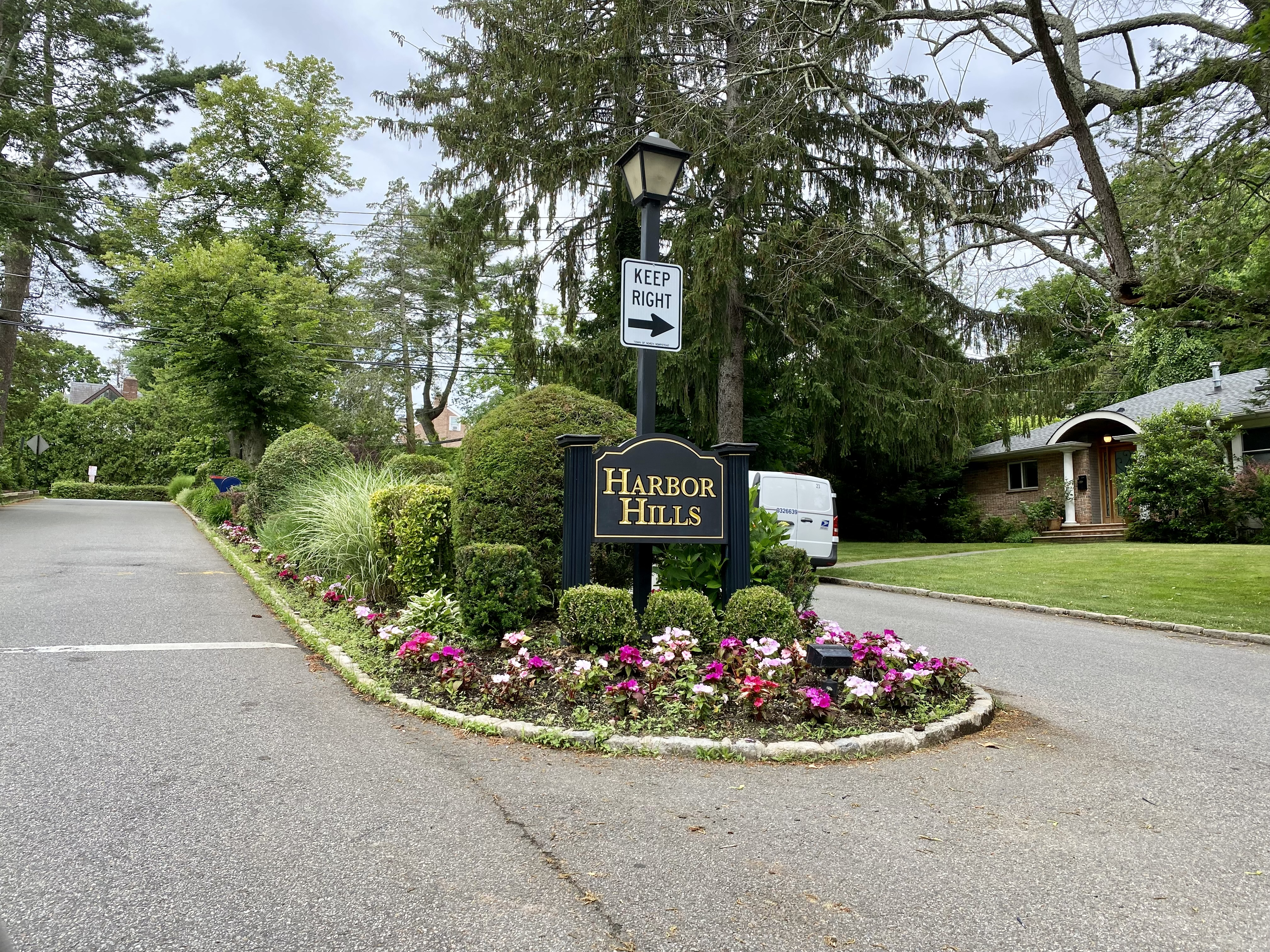
- A Harbor Hills entrance sign in 2021

- Location in Nassau County and the state of New York

- Location on Long Island Location within the state of New York
- Coordinates: 40°47′19″N 73°44′56″W
- Country: United States
- State: New York
- County: Nassau
- Town: North Hempstead

Area
  - Total: 0.18 sq mi (0.46 km^{2})
  - Land: 0.12 sq mi (0.31 km^{2})
  - Water: 0.058 sq mi (0.15 km^{2})
- Elevation: 72 ft (22 m)

Population (2020)
  - Total: 562
  - Density: 4,708.1/sq mi (1,817.82/km^{2})
- Time zone: UTC-5 (Eastern (EST))
  - Summer (DST): UTC-4 (EDT)
- ZIP Code: 11023 (Great Neck)
- Area codes: 516, 363
- FIPS code: 36-32094
- GNIS feature ID: 0952189

Harbor Hills is a hamlet and census-designated place (CDP) located on the Great Neck Peninsula within the Town of North Hempstead in Nassau County, on the North Shore of Long Island, in New York, United States. The population was 562 at the time of the 2020 census.

== History ==
In 1956, the Town of North Hempstead approved the construction of the community's swimming pool and its bathhouses – and approved of the creation of the Harbor Hills Park District, which was created specifically for the construction of the community's new park complex and subsequently its operations and maintenance. The contract was awarded to Great Neck-based Schumacher & Forelle, which bid $169,500 (1956 USD) for the pool's construction, and promised to do the work in 110 days. The project was paid for by the hamlet's roughly 175 residents.

The community's pool was reconstructed between 1986 and 1989, and was again paid for by the residents of the hamlet. This controversial project led to a lawsuit filed by residents over the payments and unexpected rises in taxes, which the Harbor Hills Civic Association asserted were due to the Town of North Hempstead overpaying, expanding the project, and failing to properly communicate with or notify the locals.

The Harbor Hills CDP was first created for the 2000 United States Census.

== Geography ==
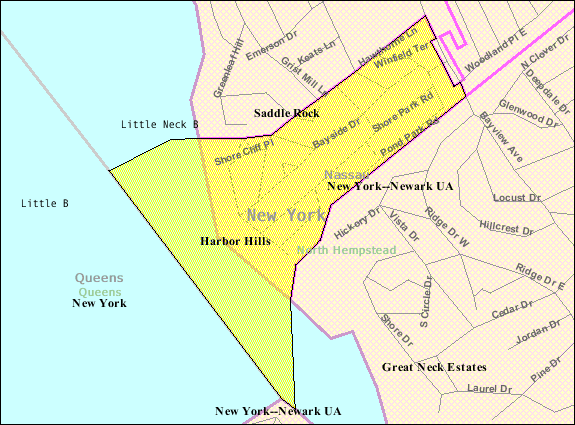
U.S. Census map of Harbor Hills

According to the United States Census Bureau, the CDP has a total area of 0.2 square miles (0.52 km^{2}), of which 0.1 square miles (0.26 km^{2}) is land and 0.1 square miles (0.26 km^{2}), or 35.29%, is water.

== Demographics ==
Historical population
Census	Pop.	Note	%±
2000	563		—
2010	576		2.3%
2020	562		−2.4%
U.S. Decennial Census

As of the census of 2000, there were 563 people, 181 households, and 165 families residing in the CDP. The population density was 5,043.2 inhabitants per square mile (1,947.2/km^{2}). There were 186 housing units at an average density of 1,666.1 per square mile (643.3/km^{2}). The racial makeup of the CDP was 96.27% White, 0.36% African American, 2.13% Asian, and 1.24% from two or more races. Hispanic or Latino of any race were 1.24% of the population.

There were 181 households, out of which 47.0% had children under the age of 18 living with them, 85.6% were married couples living together, 4.4% had a female householder with no husband present, and 8.3% were non-families. 7.2% of all households were made up of individuals, and 5.0% had someone living alone who was 65 years of age or older. The average household size was 3.11 and the average family size was 3.25.

In the CDP, the population was spread out, with 32.1% under the age of 18, 3.6% from 18 to 24, 19.4% from 25 to 44, 29.3% from 45 to 64, and 15.6% who were 65 years of age or older. The median age was 43 years. For every 100 females, there were 99.6 males. For every 100 females age 18 and over, there were 93.9 males.

The median income for a household in the CDP was $153,181, and the median income for a family was $153,619. Males had a median income of $100,000 versus $35,156 for females. The per capita income for the CDP was $62,054. About 3.4% of families and 4.4% of the population were below the poverty line, including 6.7% of those under age 18 and none of those age 65 or over.

== Government ==
=== Town representation ===
As Harbor Hills is an unincorporated hamlet, it has no government of its own, and is instead governed directly by the Town of North Hempstead in Manhasset.

Harbor Hills is located in the Town of North Hempstead's 5th district, which as of March 2026 is represented in the North Hempstead Town Council by resident Yaron Levy (R–Harbor Hills).

=== Representation in higher government ===
==== Nassau County representation ====
Harbor Hills is located in Nassau County's 10th Legislative district, which as of March 2022 is represented in the Nassau County Legislature by Mazi Melesa Pilip (R–Great Neck).

==== New York State representation ====
===== New York State Assembly =====
Harbor Hills is located in the New York State Assembly's 16th State Assembly district, which as of March 2026 is represented by Daniel J. Norber (R–Great Neck).

===== New York State Senate =====
Harbor Hills is located in the New York State Senate's 7th State Senate district, which as of March 2026 is represented in the New York State Senate by Jack M. Martins (R–Old Westbury).

==== Federal representation ====
===== United States Congress =====
Harbor Hills is located in New York's 3rd congressional district, which as of March 2026 is represented in the United States Congress by Thomas R. Suozzi (D–Glen Cove).

===== United States Senate =====
Like the rest of New York, Harbor Hills is represented in the United States Senate by Charles E. Schumer (D) and Kirsten Gillibrand (D).

=== Politics ===
In the 2024 U.S. presidential election, the majority of Harbor Hills voters voted for Donald J. Trump (R).

== Education ==
=== School district ===
Harbor Hills is located entirely within the boundaries of the Great Neck Union Free School District. As such, all children who reside within Harbor Hills and attend public schools go to Great Neck's schools.

=== Library district ===
Harbor Hills is located within the boundaries of the Great Neck Library District, which is served by the Great Neck Public Library.

== See also ==
- Great Neck Estates, New York
- Great Neck (village), New York
- Great Neck Gardens, New York
- Saddle Rock Estates, New York
