= Kim Keiserman =

American politician

Member-elect of the New York State Assembly from the 16th district
- Assuming office January 2027
- Succeeding: Daniel Norber

Personal details
- Party: Democratic

Kim Keiserman (born 1970/1971) is an American politician. She is the Democratic member-elect of the New York State Assembly from the 16th district. Prior to her victory, she was an education consultant and non-profit leader.

== Biography ==
Keiserman was born in 1970 or 1971. She studied at the College of William & Mary, where she obtained a bachelor's degree in government and a Master of Arts and education degree.

Keiserman taught social studies in high schools before joining the Tanenbaum Center for Interreligious Understanding as an education consultant. She is co-president of AGATE of Port Washington. She is also a member of the North Hempstead Housing Authority Board of Commissioners, as well as the Port Washington Parent Resource Center board.

Keiserman decided to join the Port Washington Democratic Club after Donald Trump became president in 2016. She also secured funding for improved urban green space as president of Baxter's Pond Foundation. After George Santos was elected to Congress in 2022, Keiserman started protesting against his presence as Congressman.

Keiserman ran in New York's 7th State Senate district in the 2024 election. Her campaign issues included education, protecting Long Island's environment, and reproductive rights. She raised more campaign money than any other candidate for State Senate that year, reaching $579,612. She won the Democratic primary in June, defeating Brad Schwartz. She lost the November general election to Republican candidate Jack Martins, 44.8% to 55.1%.

Keiserman ran in the 2026 New York State Assembly election in the 16th district, which is located in the Town of North Hempstead. Norber had decided not to run for re-election. Keiserman cited the United States affordability crisis as a main campaign issue, as well as clean water and Long Island's environment. She won the general election in November, defeating Republican candidate David Hassid and flipping the district. Her victory was part of a "blue wave" during the 2026 midterm elections.

Keiserman lives in Port Washington.
