= Gina Sillitti =

American Democratic Party politician (born 1978)

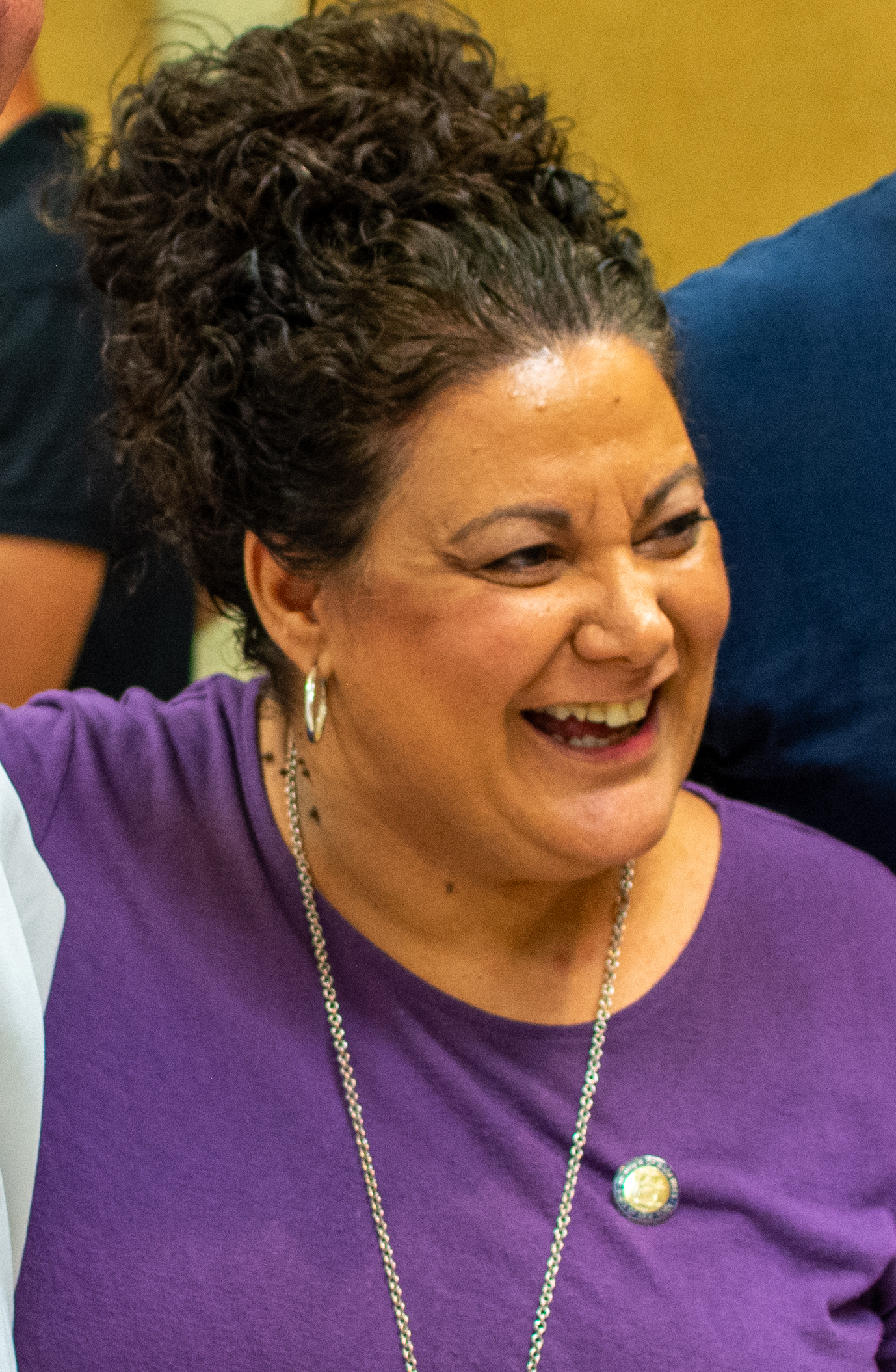
- Sillitti in 2023

Member of the New York State Assembly from the 16th district
- In office January 6, 2021 – December 31, 2024
- Preceded by: Anthony D'Urso
- Succeeded by: Daniel Norber

Personal details
- Born: April 5, 1978 (age 48) Long Island
- Party: Democratic
- Education: University of Georgia (BA)
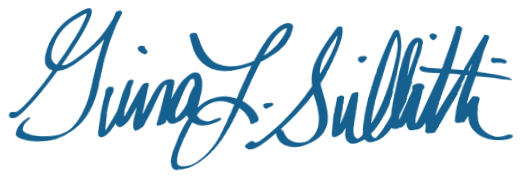
- Signature
- Website: Campaign website Official website

Gina Sillitti (born April 5, 1978) is an American Democratic Party politician who represented New York State Assembly district 16 between 2021 and 2024, which includes Port Washington, Manhasset, Great Neck, North Hills, East Hills, Flower Hill, Old Westbury, Roslyn Estates, Roslyn Heights, Herricks and Lake Success of Nassau County on Long Island.

== Early life and education ==
Sillitti grew up in Mount Sinai, New York and Florida. She earned a bachelor's degree in political science from the University of Georgia in 2000. She moved to Manorhaven in 2012.

Before running for office, she spent nearly two decades in public service, starting at the Nassau County Legislature.

== Career ==
Sillitti began her political career working in the office of Nassau County Legislator Dave Mejias. She then worked in the Department of Community Services for the Town of North Hempstead, being appointed as deputy commissioner in 2010. She later worked as director of legislator affairs and deputy chief of staff for Town Supervisor Jon Kaiman.

From 2015 to 2020, Sillitti was the human resources director for the Nassau County Board of Elections.

Sillitti was nominated at the Nassau County Democratic Committee Convention on February 11, 2020, after Assemblyman Anthony D'Urso announced he would be retiring.

Sillitti ran on a platform to increase state funding for local schools and roads, reducing property taxes, and protecting Long Island Sound and drinking water. She also advocated for stimulus relief from the COVID-19 pandemic and emphasized she would be accessible to her constituents.

In late February 2021, after the Andrew Cuomo sexual harassment allegations became public, Sillitti was among a group of assemblywomen who issued a statement calling for an independent investigator to be appointed by Attorney General Letitia James. She later pushed back against calls for his immediate resignation, being among 23 Democratic assemblywomen to say the attorney general's investigation should be completed first, in a split among New York Democrats.

In the 2024 New York State Assembly election, she was unseated by Republican Daniel Norber.

== Personal life ==
Sillitti is married to Kevin Clemency. They have one son, William.

New York State Assembly
Preceded by Anthony D'Urso	New York State Assembly, 16th District; January 6, 2021 – December 31, 2024	Succeeded by Daniel Norber
