= 9-11 Memorial Bridge =

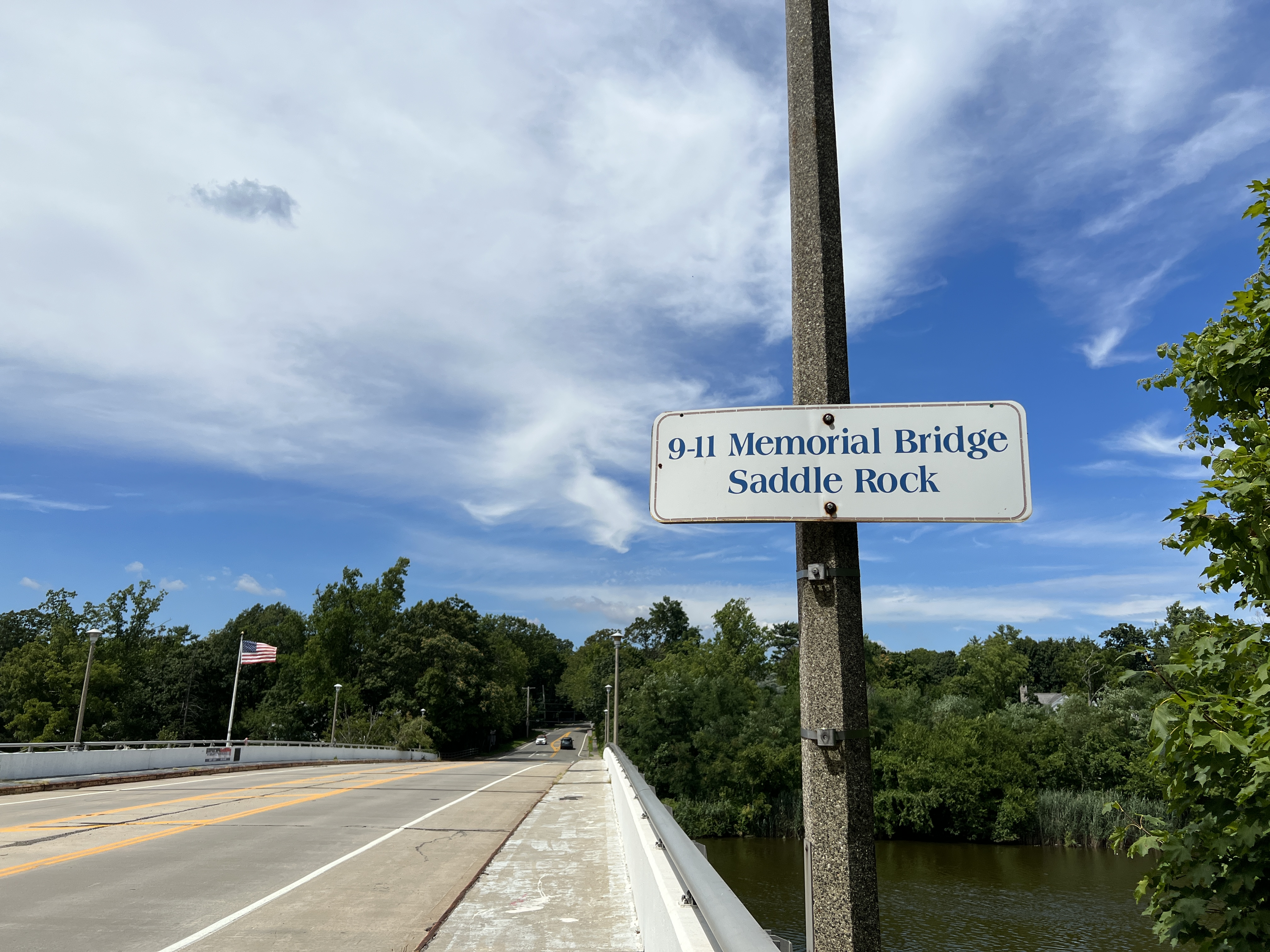
- The bridge in August 2022, looking north
- Coordinates: 40°47′58.2″N 73°44′55.3″W
- Carries: Nassau County Route C09
- Crosses: Udall Mill Pond
- Locale: Saddle Rock, New York, United States
- Owner: Nassau County, New York
- Maintained by: Nassau County Department of Public Works

Characteristics
- Design: Concrete arch bridge
- Total length: 324 feet (99 m)

History
- Built: 1971

Location
- Interactive map of 9-11 Memorial Bridge

The 9-11 Memorial Bridge (formerly known as the Saddle Rock Bridge and Udall's Bridge) is a bridge in the Incorporated Village of Saddle Rock in the Town of North Hempstead, in Nassau County, on the North Shore of Long Island, in New York, United States.

== Description ==
The bridge was built in 1971 over Udall Mill Pond, connecting Bayview Avenue in Saddle Rock to West Shore Road in Kings Point, and replaced an older span. It is of a concrete arch design. It is 324 feet (99 m) long, and is owned and maintained by the Nassau County Department of Public Works.

On September 11, 2001, due to the clear view of the World Trade Center from the bridge, many locals congregated on the bridge deck to witness the hitting of, the fire at, and subsequently, the collapse of the Twin Towers. Shortly after the towers collapsed, locals held memorials on the bridge for those who lost their lives (including the deaths of several Great Neck area residents) and left patriotic and positive messages and drawings on it – both out of grief and mourning and out of patriotism and hope.

Shortly afterwards, on December 27, 2001, the bridge was re-dedicated as the 9-11 Memorial Bridge at a ceremony led by officials from both the Incorporated Village of Saddle Rock and the County of Nassau. A plaque on the bridge honors those who lost their lives on, or as a result of, the terrorist attacks and commemorates the re-dedication of the bridge.

In more recent times, the 9-11 Memorial Bridge continues to be the location of 9-11 memorial services held on Patriot Day.

The bridge's New York State bridge identification number is 3300400.

== See also ==
- Memorials and services for the September 11 attacks
