= Elaine Phillips =

American politician

Elaine R. Phillips

15th Comptroller of Nassau County
- Incumbent
- Assumed office January 1, 2022
- Preceded by: Jack Schnirman

Member of the New York State Senate from the 7th district
- In office January 1, 2017 – December 31, 2018
- Preceded by: Jack Martins
- Succeeded by: Anna Kaplan

Mayor of Flower Hill
- In office January 1, 2012 – December 31, 2016
- Preceded by: Charles W. Weiss
- Succeeded by: Robert McNamara

Personal details
- Born: December 3, 1959 (age 66)
- Party: Republican
- Spouse: Andy Phillips
- Children: 3
- Education: Pennsylvania State University
- Website: Official website

Elaine Phillips (née Reidman) is an American politician who currently serves as Nassau County Comptroller, with a term beginning in January 2022. She was elected to the position in a landslide victory, defeating Democrat Ryan Cronin 61%-39% to succeed retiring incumbent Jack Schnirman. Phillips previously represented the New York State Senate's 7th district, and had previously served as the 18th Mayor of Flower Hill, New York. She is a Republican. Phillips was elected to the Senate in 2016 but was defeated in her 2018 re-election bid.

== Life and career ==
Phillips was born and raised in Pennsylvania. She is the daughter of John Reidman, a steel worker who died when she was 12, and Betty Reidman, who worked as a cook at a local American Legion post. Phillips attended Penn State University, where she earned both her bachelor's degree in political science and an M.B.A. in finance. A former financial analyst, Phillips worked for large financial institutions for over 20 years, including MetLife and JP Morgan Securities. She later served as a vice president in Institutional Sales at Goldman Sachs.

Phillips and her husband, Andy, are the parents of three daughters.

=== Mayor of Flower Hill, New York (2012–2016) ===
Phillips served as the mayor of Flower Hill, New York from 2012 to 2016. During her tenure as Mayor, she cut taxes and stabilized the village's finances (which, under her predecessor's management, were criticized by the New York State Comptroller's Office). Phillips also implemented an environmental policy to expand the number of trees in the village, an effort which led the Village to be named Tree City USA by the National Arbor Day Committee.

Phillips was the first female in Flower Hill's history to hold the position.

=== New York State Senator (2017–2018) ===
In 2016, State Senator Jack Martins decided to run for Congress, foregoing re-election to the Senate to do so. Phillips announced that she would seek the open Senate seat and was supported by Martins.

Phillips ran on a platform in 2016 which included cutting taxes, combating the heroin epidemic and strengthening state ethics laws in response to corruption scandals in Albany. Phillips was unopposed for the Republican nomination. With the Seventh district being one of the most competitive districts in the state, the race was projected to be close. In the end, Phillips defeated Democrat Adam M. Haber by a 51% to 49% margin. She was sworn in on January 1, 2017.

In 2018, Phillips lost her re-election bid to Democrat Anna Kaplan, who won with 55% of the vote to 45% for Phillips.

=== Nassau County Comptroller (since 2022) ===
In November 2021, Phillips was elected the first woman to serve as Nassau County Comptroller with 61 percent of the vote.

== Election results ==
- November 2016 general election, New York State Senate, 7th Senate District

Elaine R. Phillips (REP - CON - IND – REF)	...	69,438
Adam M. Haber (DEM - WFP - WEP)	...	66,029

- November 2021 general election, Nassau County, New York, Comptroller

Elaine R. Phillips (REP - CON –	...	163,146
Ryan E. Cronin (DEM - WFP -	...	114,349

Political offices
Preceded by Jack Martins	New York Senate, 7th District; 2017–2018	Succeeded by Anna Kaplan
Preceded by Charles W. Weiss	Mayor of Flower Hill, New York; 2012–2016	Succeeded by Robert McNamara
