= Saddle Rock Grist Mill =

- U.S. National Register of Historic Places
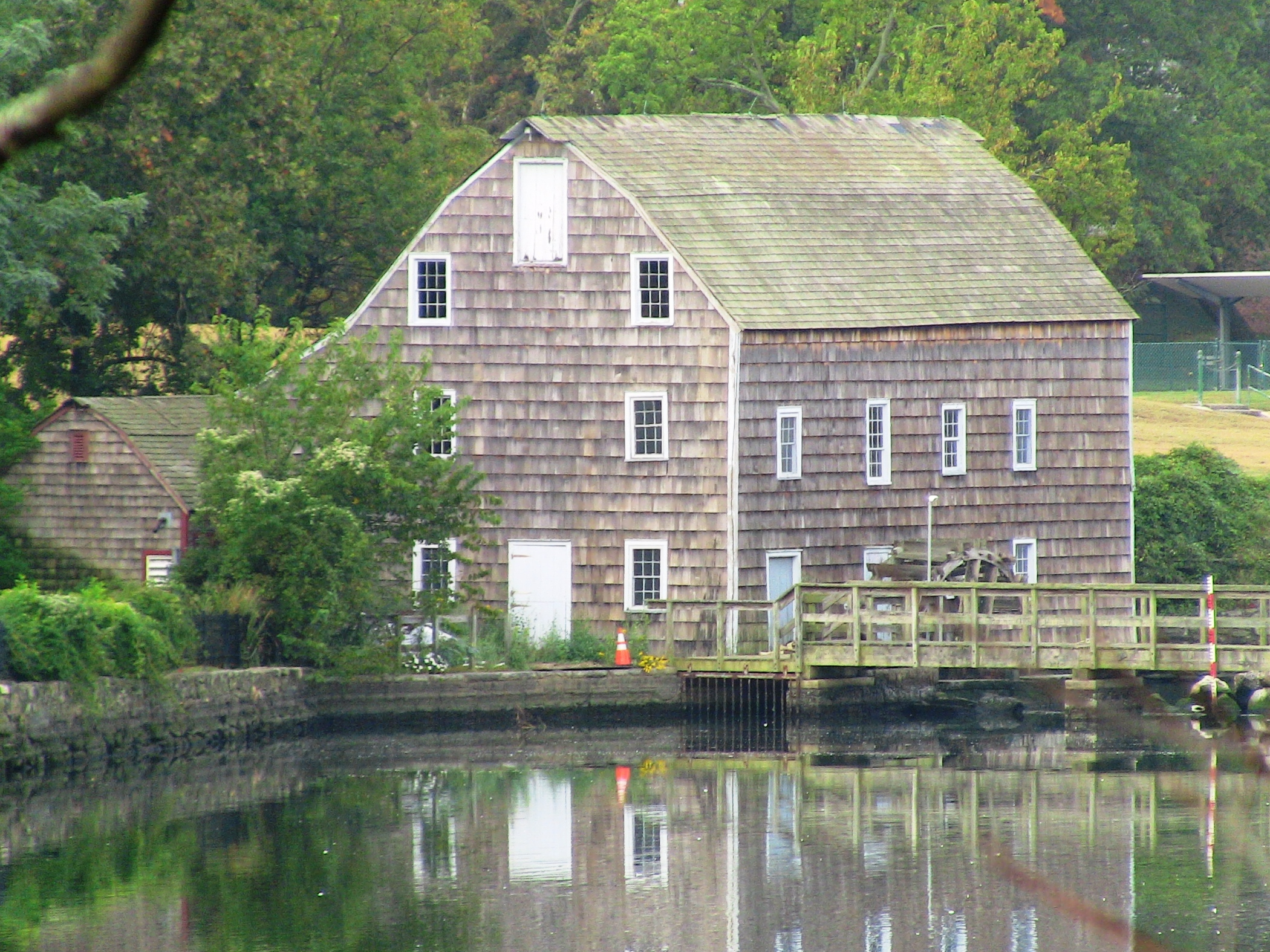

- Location within New York City Location within the United States
- Location: Grist Mill Lane and Little Neck Bay, Saddle Rock, New York
- Coordinates: 40°47′51″N 73°45′4″W
- Area: 1 acre (0.40 ha)
- Built: early 1700s
- MPS: Long Island Wind and Tide Mills TR
- NRHP reference No.: 78001866
- Added to NRHP: December 27, 1978

Saddle Rock Grist Mill is a historic grist mill building located in Saddle Rock, a village in the town of North Hempstead in Nassau County, New York. It is a 2 1/2-story gambrel-roofed structure. Adjacent is a stream-fed millpond that is supplemented by tidal water impounded by the dam. It dates to the 18th century and is the only extant tidal grist mill on Long Island. The building underwent restoration in the 1950s and was operated as a local history museum, but is now closed.

It was added to the National Register of Historic Places in 1978.
