= Anthony D'Urso =

New York State politician

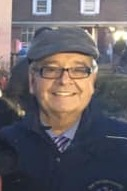
- D'Urso in 2019

Member of the New York State Assembly from the 16th district
- In office January 1, 2017 – December 31, 2020
- Preceded by: Michelle Schimel
- Succeeded by: Gina Sillitti

Personal details
- Born: October 17, 1939 (age 86) Formia, Italy
- Party: Democratic
- Spouse: Maria
- Children: 4
- Education: Pratt Institute School of Architecture (BArch, MArch)
- Website: Official website

Anthony 'Tony' D'Urso (born October 17, 1939) is an Italian-American politician who represented the 16th District of the New York State Assembly from 2017 to 2020. First elected in 2016, he is a Democrat. The district includes the majority of the town of North Hempstead in Nassau County on Long Island.

== Early life ==
Born in Italy, D'Urso immigrated to the United States at age 21 with only eight years of education. As a child in Formia, Italy, he witnessed both of his parents risking their lives to hide a Jewish family from the German soldiers. During the Holocaust, D'urso's father hid about 12 Jews from the Nazis at great risk to his own family, saving them from deportation. With the help of Michael Weinstock, D'urso had the opportunity to meet members of the Sinigallias family in Naples in January 2018, descendants of the people his father rescued.

== Career ==
D'Urso began his public service career in 1971 with the New York City Department of Housing Preservation and Development, where he rose through the ranks to become assistant commissioner of the Division of Architecture Engineering and Construction. During this time, he also taught at Bronx Community College and volunteered with youth sports teams and community organizations. While working full-time, he received his bachelor's and master's degrees from the Pratt Institute School of Architecture.

In 1991, D'Urso was elected councilman for the town of North Hempstead, and was reelected four times. He would be term limited in 2005. Over ten years later, Assemblywoman Michelle Schimel announced in early 2016 that she would not seek a sixth term. While the district was considered competitive, Nassau Democrats coalesced behind D'Urso. Facing no primary, D'Urso was free to focus on the general election, where he would face Republican Matthew Varvaro, who he defeated, 52% to 48%, to take the seat. He was reelected easily in 2018, winning by a margin of 63% to 37%. In the Assembly, D'Urso is the chair of the Long Island Sound Committee.

On February 20, 2019, Pope Francis invited D'Urso to Rome and honored him, for his efforts hiding his Jewish friends from the Nazis, when he was a boy.

== Personal life ==
D'Urso and his wife, Maria, lived in New Hyde Park, New York for 35 years before moving to Port Washington North, New York. They have four children.

New York State Assembly
Preceded by Michelle Schimel	New York Assembly, 16th District; 2017–2021	Succeeded by Gina Sillitti
