= Michelle Schimel =

American politician (born 1957)

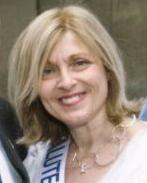

Member of the New York State Assembly from the 16th district
- In office March 27, 2007 – December 31, 2016
- Preceded by: Thomas DiNapoli
- Succeeded by: Anthony D'Urso

Personal details
- Born: August 8, 1957 (age 69) Brooklyn, New York
- Party: Democratic
- Children: two: Alex, Spencer
- Education: University of Pennsylvania
- Profession: Physical therapist, businesswoman, politician
- Website: Official website

Michelle E. Schimel (born August 8, 1957) is a former Democratic member of the New York State Assembly, representing the 16th Assembly District in Nassau County from 2007 to 2016.

== Early life and education ==
Schimel was born in Brooklyn, New York. In 1978, she received a BS degree from the University of Pennsylvania School of Allied Medical Professions. She was vice president of a fashion accessories firm in Manhattan from 1982 to 1994. She also worked at North Shore University Hospital as a physical therapist and certified wound care specialist.

== Political career ==
Schimel was first elected Town Clerk of North Hempstead in 1999, a position she held until being elected to the State Assembly.

On March 27, 2007, she won 86 percent of the vote in a special election to replace Thomas DiNapoli who became State Comptroller. Schimel was re-elected to subsequent terms in 2008, 2010, 2012 and 2014.

== Personal life ==
Schimel resided in Great Neck, New York from 1982 until 2015, when she moved to Port Washington, N.Y. She has two sons, Alex and Spencer. She and her husband, Mark Schimel, separated in 2011 after 32 years of marriage and later divorced. She was married to David Leiman, a senior adviser for Merrill Lynch, in Port Washington, N.Y., in May 2016. She serves on the board of New Yorkers Against Gun Violence and in 1995 she and former Rep. Carolyn McCarthy co-founded the organization's Long Island chapter.

== Election results ==
- March 2007 special election, NYS Assembly, 16th AD

Michelle Schimel (DEM – IND – WOR)	...	5,615 85.7%
Ryan DeCicco (REP)	...	933 14.2%

- November 2008 general election, NYS Assembly, 16th AD

Michelle E. Schimel (DEM – IND – WOR)	...	34,568 63.3%
Matthew S. Mitchell (REP)	...	19,978 36.6%

- November 2010 general election, NYS Assembly, 16th AD

Michelle Schimel (DEM – IND – WOR)	...	23,384 58.2%
Scott D. Diamond (REP – CON)	...	16,748 41.7%

New York State Assembly
Preceded by Thomas DiNapoli	New York State Assembly, 16th District; 2007–2016	Succeeded by Anthony D'Urso
