= Anna Kaplan =

American politician (born 1965)

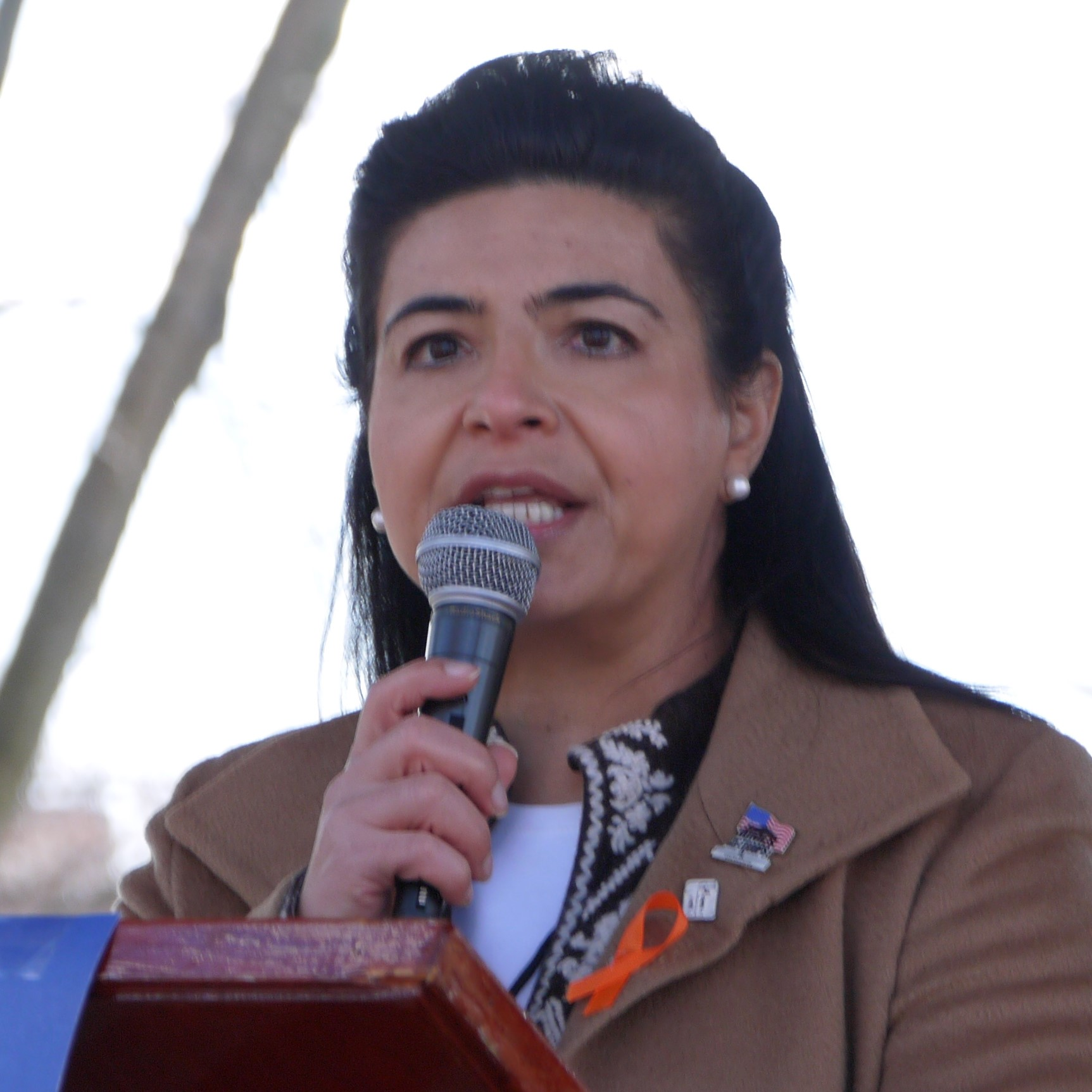
- Kaplan speaking at a March for Our Lives demonstration in 2018

Member of the New York Senate from the 7th district
- In office January 1, 2019 – December 31, 2022
- Preceded by: Elaine Phillips
- Succeeded by: Jack Martins

Personal details
- Born: Anna Monahemi; Farsi: آنا موناهمی; August 23, 1965 (age 60) Tabriz, Iran
- Party: Democratic
- Spouse: Darren Kaplan
- Children: 2 daughters
- Education: Yeshiva University (BS, JD)

Anna Kaplan (née Monahemi) (born August 23, 1965; Farsi: آنا کاپلان) is an Iranian-born American attorney and politician. A Democrat, she was a member of the New York State Senate from 2018 to 2022, representing New York's 7th State Senate district on Long Island.

Kaplan is the first Iranian-American to be elected to either of New York State's legislative chambers. She is also the first former political refugee to serve in the New York State Senate.

Kaplan came to the United States at 13 years of age without her family as a Jewish child refugee from Iran, after the 1979 Islamic Revolution swept Iran. The unaccompanied child refugee was first taken into the care of the Lubavitch community in Crown Heights, Brooklyn for a number of months. She was next sent to live with a foster family in Chicago, Illinois, until over two years later when finally her parents were able to obtain U.S. visas and enter the United States. They moved to Queens, New York, and then to Great Neck, New York.

Kaplan graduated with a BS in Biology from the Stern College for Women at Yeshiva University in 1985. She then received her J.D. from the Cardozo School of Law in 1991. She started her political career as a member of the North Hempstead Town Board in 2011, and served until her election to the New York State Senate in 2018.

== Early life and education ==
=== Iran ===
Kaplan (née Monahemi) was born to an Iranian Jewish family in Tabriz, Iran, while approximately 80,000 Jews lived in Iran. She was raised in Tehran, Iran, where her father was a carpet dealer and she attended a Jewish day school. She said her family traces its lineage back to the Babylonian Exile of Jews from Jerusalem in 597 BCE.

=== United States ===
When the 1979 Islamic Revolution swept Iran, on the advice of their rabbi Anna's parents sent her on her own to the United States for her safety at age 13. An American-Jewish family sponsored her through the Jewish humanitarian nonprofit organization Hebrew Immigrant Aid Society (HIAS), and she was granted a visa to the United States. She arrived as an unaccompanied child refugee in Crown Heights, Brooklyn, where she was taken into the care of the Lubavitch community for a number of months.

Anna was next sent to live with a foster family in Chicago, Illinois, where she attended and completed high school and learned English (her fourth language, after Aramaic, Farsi, and Hebrew), until over two years later when finally her parents were able to obtain U.S. visas and enter the United States. After her family reunited in Chicago, and once she had graduated high school, they moved to Queens, New York, and then to Great Neck, New York (which lies within the Town of North Hempstead). Eventually, there were granted political asylum in the United States.

Kaplan graduated from the Stern College for Women at Yeshiva University in New York City with a BS in Biology in 1985. She received her J.D. from the Cardozo School of Law, in New York City, in 1991.

== Career ==
After graduating from Cardozo School of Law in 1991, Kaplan worked as a lawyer for several years.

=== Early political career ===
Kaplan was elected to and served as a trustee of the Great Neck Public Library Board of Trustees from 2005 to 2009. She was then a member of the North Hempstead Board of Zoning Appeals from 2009 to 2011.

Kaplan started her major political career when she was elected to and served for two terms as a member of the Town of North Hempstead Board in 2011, having been re-elected in 2015 with 67% of the vote, and served until her election to the New York State Senate in 2018.

=== 2016 U.S. congressional primary ===
On January 11, 2016, Kaplan announced that she would run for the seat in the United States House of Representatives for New York's 3rd congressional district being vacated by retiring congressman Steve Israel. Kaplan was defeated in the 2016 New York Congressional Democratic Primary by former Nassau County Executive Tom Suozzi, who garnered 35% of the vote as she received 16%. Suozzi won the general election.

=== 2018–2022; New York State Senator ===
Kaplan served two terms as a New York State Senator, from 2018 to 2022. She said: "Today, I’m living the American dream. I came as a political refugee and was now elected to a high office in a great state in the greatest country on earth.”

On April 27, 2018, flanked by Nassau County Democratic Party Chairman Jay S. Jacobs and New York Governor Andrew Cuomo, Kaplan announced her candidacy for the New York State Senate's 7th District, which runs from the North Shore to roughly the central part of Western Nassau County on Long Island, to a large gathering of supporters and state and local Democratic elected officials at the "Yes We Can" Community Center in Westbury, New York.

On August 1, 2018, Kaplan became the first candidate for New York State office to be endorsed by former President Barack Obama. She was also endorsed by, among others, Governor Andrew Cuomo, the National Organization for Women, the New York State United Teachers, the Professional Staff Congress, the AFL-CIO of New York, the United Auto Workers (the UAW), and the Working Families Party.

On November 6, 2018, Kaplan defeated incumbent Republican NY State Senator Elaine Phillips and was elected to the New York State Senate with 55% of the vote. She was elected in 2018 as part of a wave of Democrats who defeated Republican incumbents and brought control of the New York Senate to the Democrats for only the third time since World War II. Kaplan was the first Iranian-American to be elected to either of New York State's legislative chambers. She was also the first former political refugee to serve in the New York State Senate.

She was a member of the so-called "Long Island Six," a group of six Democrats who represented Long Island in the New York State Senate and often voted as a block. In January 2019, Kaplan was one of four new state senators spotlighted by The New York Times in a piece on first-time New York senators.

Kaplan was re-elected for another term in 2020. She won in the general election with 57% of the vote. She had been endorsed by Planned Parenthood Empire State, the National Federation of Independent Business, and the New York State Public Employees Federation, and rated 100% by Planned Parenthood Empire State and the New York League of Conservation Voters.

Kaplan ran for a third term in the 2022 NY Senate elections, in a district whose lines had been withdrawn, leaving her as a new candidate to be considered by 40% of the electorate. She won the Democratic primary election with 86% of the vote. She was endorsed by EMILYs List, Everytown for Gun Safety, the Council of School Supervisors & Administrators, the National Federation of Independent Business, the New York League of Conservation Voters, Planned Parenthood Empire State, the New York State United Teachers, the Professional Staff Congress, the UAW, the New York State Public Employees Federation, the New York State United Teachers, and the Working Families Party, and rated 100% by the New York League of Conservation Voters and Planned Parenthood Empire State. She lost re-election in the general election to Republican Jack Martins, who defeated her 53% to 47%.

==== N.Y. State Senate committee roles ====
Kaplan was Chairperson of the Senate Committee on Commerce, Economic Development and Small Business, and was a member of the Senate Committees on Children and Families, Internet and Technology, Judiciary, Mental Health and Developmental Disabilities, Transportation and Women's Issues. She was also a member of the Legislative Women's Caucus.

In June 2021 Kaplan was the recipient of anti-Semitic and misogynistic abuse because she promoted Covid-19 vaccinations. She said, “This incident is a sad reminder that Nassau County is not immune to hatred and white supremacy, and it’s our responsibility as a community to forcefully reject this evil whenever it reveals itself among us.”

In May 2022 when the far-right, neo-fascist militant organization the Proud Boys returned to Rockville Centre in the Town of Hempstead for the second time in a year, Kaplan said the march was intended to "intimidate our community and spread their vile, hateful agenda." She later supported a group of anti Proud Boys people.

==== Policy positions ====
Kaplan supports abortion rights, gun safety, middle class tax relief, increased funding for local public schools,a permanent cap on property taxes, and addressing hatred, antisemitism, and extremism. Among the legislation that she supported that she was proudest of were the Reproductive Health Act in New York State that codified the 1973 U.S. Supreme Court decision in Roe vs. Wade and which protects reproductive rights, decriminalized abortion, and eliminated several restrictions on voluntary abortions, her bill banning untraceable ghost guns, and a bill concerning educating students about the Holocaust. She is a supporter of the primarily Muslim Iranian community, a strong opponent of the 2015 Iran nuclear deal, and a staunch advocate of Israel.

=== 2024 U.S. congressional election ===
In May 2023, Kaplan announced she would run for US Congress in New York's 3rd congressional district, seeking to succeed George Santos in either the 2024 election or a special election if Santos were to resign or be expelled from the House. However, upon the expulsion of Santos, Kaplan decided against running in the special February 2024 election to fill his seat, as Queens and Nassau County Democrats tapped former representative Suozzi to run for the seat.

== Accolades ==
City & State NY named Kaplan to its "Long Island Power 100" list in 2020, 2021, and 2022, to its "Economic Development Power 100" list in 2022, and to its "Power of Diversity: Middle Eastern & North African 50" list in 2023.

Long Island Business News named her to its list of "Long Island’s Most Powerful Influencers of 2022." She was also a 2022 honoree of the New York Jewish Week’s “36 to Watch.” The American Red Cross of Greater New York name Kaplan "Legislator of the Year" in 2022, and the New York League of Conservation Voters gave her its Rising Star Award in 2022.

== Personal life ==
Kaplan and her husband, Darren, whom she married in 1995, live in North Hills, New York (which lies within the Town of North Hempstead). They have two daughters.

== See also ==
- List of Iranian Jews
- List of Iranian women politicians
