= New York's 16th State Assembly district =

American legislative district

Assemblymember
Daniel Norber; R–Great Neck
- Registration: 40.2% Democratic; 25.8% Republican; 30.2% No party preference
- Demographics: 64% White; 2% Black; 9% Hispanic; 22% Asian; 0% Native American; 0% Hawaiian/Pacific Islander; 1% Other
- Population (2020): 131,123
- Registered voters: 104,677

New York's 16th State Assembly district is one of the 150 districts in the New York State Assembly. It has been represented by Republican Daniel Norber since 2025, who defeated Gina Sillitti in the November 5, 2024, New York State Assembly election. In 2026, he announced that he would not seek re-election.

== Geography ==
=== 2020s ===
District 16 is located in Nassau County, within the Town of North Hempstead. The district includes the villages of Great Neck, North Hills, Flower Hill, Roslyn Estates, Sands Point and Lake Success, as well as the hamlets of North New Hyde Park, Plandome, Roslyn Heights, Port Washington, and Herricks.

The 16th district is entirely within New York's 3rd congressional district, and entirely within New York's 7th State Senate district.

=== 2010s ===
District 16 is located in Nassau County, within the Town of North Hempstead. The district includes the villages of Great Neck, North Hills, East Hills, Flower Hill, Old Westbury, Roslyn Estates, and Lake Success, as well as the hamlets of Roslyn Heights, Port Washington, and Herricks.

== Recent election results ==
=== 2026 ===
2026 New York State Assembly election, District 16
Party	Candidate	Votes	%
Republican	David Hassid		
Conservative	David Hassid		
Total	David Hassid		
Democratic	Kim Keiserman		
Write-in			
Total votes			

=== 2024 ===
2024 New York State Assembly election, District 16
Party	Candidate	Votes	%
Republican	Daniel Norber	32,722	
Conservative	Daniel Norber	2,120	
Total	Daniel Norber	34,842	50.4
Democratic	Gina Sillitti (incumbent)	34,104	49.4
Write-in		111	0.2
Total votes		69,057	100.0
Republican gain from Democratic			

=== 2022 ===
2022 New York State Assembly election, District 16
Party	Candidate	Votes	%
Democratic	Gina Sillitti	25,365	
Working Families	Gina Sillitti	1,172	
Total	Gina Sillitti (incumbent)	26,537	51.7
Republican	Vibhuti Jha	23,151	
Conservative	Vibhuti Jha	1,601	
Total	Vibhuti Jha	24,752	48.2
Write-in		21	0.1
Total votes		51,310	100.0
Democratic hold			

=== 2020 ===
2020 New York State Assembly election, District 16
Party	Candidate	Votes	%
Democratic	Gina Sillitti	33,933	
Working Families	Gina Sillitti	1,522	
Total	Gina Sillitti	35,455	53.7
Republican	Ragini Srivastava	27,776	
Conservative	Ragini Srivastava	1,967	
Independence	Ragini Srivastava	520	
Total	Ragini Srivastava	30,263	45.8
Libertarian	Blay Tarnoff	339	0.5
Write-in		19	0.0
Total votes		66,076	100.0
Democratic hold			

=== 2018 ===
2018 New York State Assembly election, District 16
Party	Candidate	Votes	%
Democratic	Anthony D'Urso	28,913	
Working Families	Anthony D'Urso	521	
Independence	Anthony D'Urso	383	
Women's Equality	Anthony D'Urso	259	
Reform	Anthony D'Urso	75	
Total	Anthony D'Urso (incumbent)	30,151	62.5
Republican	Bryan Divins Jr.	16,749	
Conservative	Bryan Divins Jr.	1,313	
Total	Bryan Divins Jr.	18,062	37.5
Write-in		14	0.0
Total votes		48,227	100.0
Democratic hold			

=== 2016 ===
2016 New York State Assembly election, District 16
Party	Candidate	Votes	%
Democratic	Anthony D'Urso	28,064	
Working Families	Anthony D'Urso	797	
Independence	Anthony D'Urso	407	
Women's Equality	Anthony D'Urso	338	
Total	Anthony D'Urso	29,606	52.2
Republican	Matthew Varvaro	24,794	
Conservative	Matthew Varvaro	2,027	
Reform	Matthew Varvaro	297	
Total	Matthew Varvaro	27,118	47.8
Write-in		14	0.0
Total votes		56,745	100.0
Democratic hold			

=== 2014 ===
2014 New York State Assembly election, District 16
Party	Candidate	Votes	%
Democratic	Michelle Schimel	16,331	
Working Families	Michelle Schimel	960	
Women's Equality	Michelle Schimel	586	
Independence	Michelle Schimel	550	
Total	Michelle Schimel (incumbent)	18,427	60.4
Republican	Douglas Lee	10,700	
Conservative	Douglas Lee	1,389	
Total	Douglas Lee	12,089	39.6
Write-in		3	0.0
Total votes		30,519	100.0
Democratic hold			

=== 2012 ===
2012 New York State Assembly election, District 16
Party	Candidate	Votes	%
Democratic	Michelle Schimel	27,208	
Working Families	Michelle Schimel	1,197	
Independence	Michelle Schimel	801	
Total	Michelle Schimel (incumbent)	29,206	61.2
Republican	Richard Stiek	16,674	
Conservative	Richard Stiek	1,813	
Total	Richard Stiek	18,487	38.8
Write-in		11	0.0
Total votes		47,704	100.0
Democratic hold			

=== 2010 ===
2010 New York State Assembly election, District 16
Party	Candidate	Votes	%
Democratic	Michelle Schimel	21,289	
Working Families	Michelle Schimel	1,090	
Independence	Michelle Schimel	1,005	
Total	Michelle Schimel (incumbent)	23,384	58.3
Republican	Scott Diamond	14,960	
Conservative	Scott Diamond	1,788	
Total	Scott Diamond	16,748	41.7
Write-in		6	0.0
Total votes		40,138	100.0
Democratic hold			
