= Jack Martins =

American attorney and politician (born 1967)

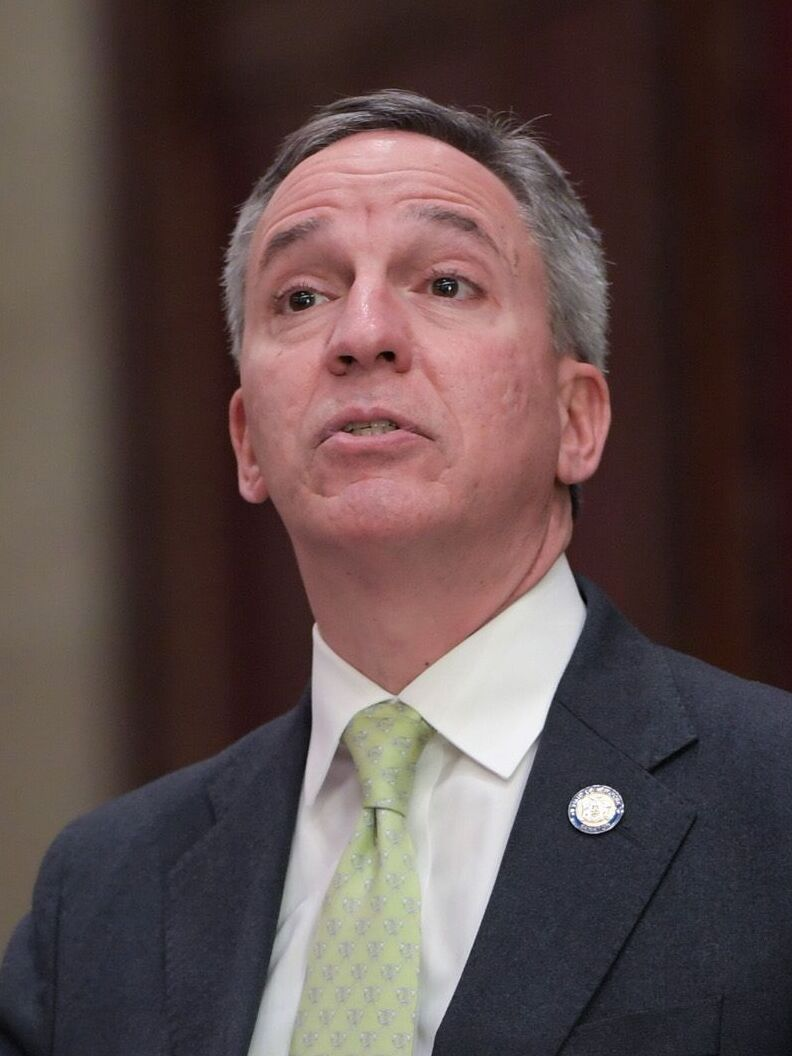
- Martins in 2024

Member of the New York State Senate from the 7th district
- Incumbent
- Assumed office January 1, 2023
- Preceded by: Anna Kaplan
- In office January 1, 2011 – December 31, 2016
- Preceded by: Craig M. Johnson
- Succeeded by: Elaine Phillips

Mayor of Mineola
- In office 2004–2010

Personal details
- Born: Joaquim M. Martins; June 19, 1967 (age 59) Queens, New York, U.S.
- Party: Republican
- Spouse: Paula
- Children: 4
- Education: American University (BA); St. John's University (JD)
- Occupation: Attorney; politician

Joaquim "Jack" M. Martins (born June 19, 1967) is an American attorney and politician serving as a member of the New York State Senate representing the 7th district. A Republican, he previously served as Mayor of Mineola, New York.

== Early life and education ==
Martins is a first-generation Portuguese American. He was born in Queens, New York, to parents who emigrated to the United States in the 1960s. He has two brothers and two sisters and was raised in Mineola. Upon graduating from Chaminade High School, he received a bachelor's degree in political science from American University in 1988. Martins went on to complete a Juris Doctor from St. John's University School of Law in 1991.

== Political career ==
=== Mayor of Mineola (2004–2010) ===
Martins was elected mayor of the Village of Mineola, New York in 2003.

=== 2008 congressional campaign ===
In 2008, Martins ran for Congress against incumbent Democratic U.S. Representative Carolyn McCarthy (D-Mineola). He was defeated by a wide margin.

=== New York State Senate ===
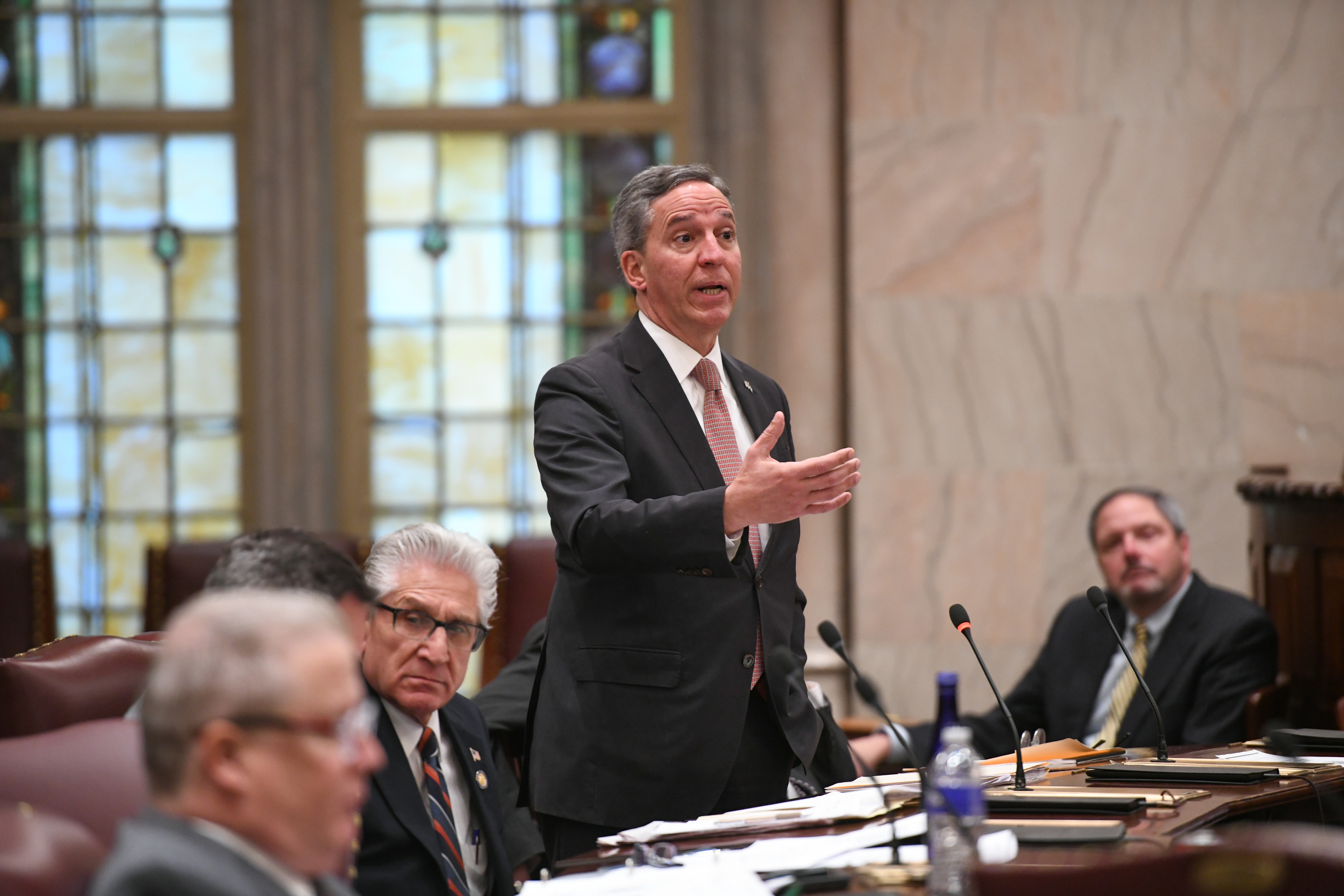
Jack Martins speaking in the New York Senate in 2025

Martins won election to the New York State Senate in 2010 as the representative for New York's 7th State Senate district. He defeated incumbent Democratic senator Craig M. Johnson by 451 votes. The election results were not certified until December 4, 2010. Johnson challenged the results and demanded a hand recount, but the New York Court of Appeals rejected his appeal on December 20, 2010.

As Senator, Martins voted for the law creating New York State's property tax cap, voted to cut income taxes for middle-class homeowners, voted to repeal the MTA payroll tax for small businesses and schools, and supported repealing the MTA payroll tax in its entirety. He authored laws reducing busing costs for school districts; creating a truss notification system to improve safety for volunteer firefighters; and establishing a new state fund to help homeless veterans.

In 2011, Martins voted against allowing same-sex marriage in New York during rollcall for the Marriage Equality Act, which narrowly passed, legalizing it by 33 to 29.

Martins was highly critical of the New York State Education Department's implementation of the Common Core standards and called for the resignation of the State's Commissioner of Education for cancelling public forums on the issue with parents and teachers. While in the Senate, Martins repeatedly led Long Island's 31 state legislators in the number of bills sponsored that were ultimately passed by both houses of the State Legislature.

In February 2016, Martins and state Assemblywoman Michelle Schimel called for new state funding to support a comprehensive groundwater study for Long Island. An expanded version of their proposal was adopted by New York Governor Andrew Cuomo.

Martins sponsored legislation that would prevent New York from entering into a state contract or investment with those who boycott Israel or other American allies.

Martins served as chairman of the State Senate's Labor Committee and was co-chair of the Senate's Task Force on Workforce Development. He previously chaired the Senate's Commerce, Economic Development and Small Business Committee and the Senate's Local Government Committee. Martins also served on the New York State Mandate Relief Council, which was created to help reduce costs for local governments and school districts by eliminating or reforming regulations.

Martins did not seek re-election to the State Senate in 2016; instead, he ran for Congress and was defeated.

In November 2022, Martins ran for State Senate in District 7 and defeated Democratic incumbent Anna Kaplan.

=== 2016 congressional campaign ===
Martins was the Republican nominee in the 2016 election to represent New York's 3rd congressional district in the United States House of Representatives, and received the endorsement of the Republican Party, Conservative Party and the Independence Party. Martins was defeated by Democrat Tom Suozzi in the general election. Suozzi won 53% of the vote to Martins' 47%.

=== 2017 Nassau County executive campaign ===
On April 26, 2017, Martins announced that he would run for Nassau County executive. Martins received the GOP nomination for County Executive and was uncontested in the primary. Martins was narrowly defeated by the Democratic nominee, Nassau County legislator Laura Curran, in the November 7, 2017, election; Curran won 51% of the vote to Martins' 48%.

=== 2024 congressional speculation ===
Amid calls for newly seated congressman George Santos to resign, Martins was mentioned as a possible replacement. After George Santos was expelled in December 2023, Martins decided to not seek the GOP nomination for the 2024 special election.

== Personal life ==
As of 2018, Martins is a board member of the Henry Viscardi School. He is a recipient of the Melvin Jones Fellowship Award, the Lions Club's highest honor. He was honored as the 2012 Portuguese Man of the Year during Nassau County's first ever public event recognizing the Portuguese Community on Long Island. He and his wife, Paula, have four daughters.

== Electoral history ==
=== US House of Representatives ===
2008 New York's 4th congressional district election
Party	Candidate	Votes	%
Democratic	Carolyn McCarthy	151,792	59.2
Independence	Carolyn McCarthy	7,318	2.9
Working Families	Carolyn McCarthy	4,918	1.9
Total	Carolyn McCarthy	164,028	64.0
Republican	Jack Martins	84,444	33.0
Conservative	Jack Martins	7,798	3.0
Total	Jack Martins	149,577	36.0
Total votes		256,270	100.0
Democratic hold			

2016 New York's 3rd congressional district election
Party	Candidate	Votes	%
Democratic	Tom Suozzi	167,758	52.9
Republican	Jack Martins	131,534	41.4
Conservative	Jack Martins	16,134	5.1
Reform	Jack Martins	1,909	0.6
Total	Jack Martins	149,577	47.1
Total votes		317,335	100.0
Democratic hold			

=== New York State Senate ===
2010 New York's 7th senatorial district election
Party	Candidate	Votes	%
Republican	Jack Martins	36,349	42.6
Conservative	Jack Martins	4,620	5.4
Independence	Jack Martins	1,959	2.3
Total	Jack Martins	42,928	50.3
Democratic	Craig M. Johnson (incumbent)	42,477	49.7
Total votes		85,405	100.0
Republican gain from Democratic			

2012 New York's 7th senatorial district election
Party	Candidate	Votes	%
Republican	Jack Martins	49,647	44.3
Conservative	Jack Martins	5,837	5.2
Independence	Jack Martins	2,173	1.9
Tax Revolt Party	Jack Martins	382	0.3
Total	Jack Martins (incumbent)	58,039	51.8
Democratic	Daniel S. Ross	51,419	45.9
Working Families	Daniel S. Ross	2,568	2.3
Total	Daniel S. Ross	53,987	48.2
Total votes		112,026	100.0
Republican hold			

2014 New York's 7th senatorial district election
Party	Candidate	Votes	%
Republican	Jack Martins	34,636	48.6
Conservative	Jack Martins	4,193	5.9
Independence	Jack Martins	1,365	1.9
Tax Revolt Party	Jack Martins	271	0.4
Total	Jack Martins (incumbent)	40,465	56.7
Democratic	Adam M. Haber	28,405	39.8
Working Families	Adam M. Haber	1,714	2.4
Women's Equality	Adam M. Haber	754	1.1
Green	Adam M. Haber	679	1.0
Total	Adam M. Haber	30,873	48.2
Total votes		71,338	100.0
Republican hold			

2022 New York's 7th senatorial district election
Party	Candidate	Votes	%
Republican	Jack Martins	60,372	49.2
Conservative	Jack Martins	4,903	4.0
Total	Jack Martins	65,275	53.2
Democratic	Anna Kaplan	55,243	45.0
Working Families	Anna Kaplan	2,204	1.8
Total	Anna Kaplan	57,447	46.8
Total votes		122,722	100.0
Republican gain from Democratic			

2024 New York's 7th senatorial district election
Party	Candidate	Votes	%
Republican	Jack Martins	82,154	51.3
Conservative	Jack Martins	6,099	3.8
Total	Jack Martins (incumbent)	88,253	55.1
Democratic	Kim Keiserman	71,700	44.8
Write-in		251	0.1
Total votes		160,204	100.0
Republican gain from Democratic			

=== Others ===
2017 Nassau County executive election

Jack Martins (REP - Reform Party - TRP - CON) - 139,204
Laura Curran (DEM) - 147,102

New York State Senate
Preceded by Craig M. Johnson	Member of the New York Senate from the 7th district 2011–2016	Succeeded by Elaine Phillips
Preceded by Anna Kaplan	Member of the New York Senate from the 7th district 2023–present	Incumbent
