= New York's 7th State Senate district =

American legislative district

Senator
Jack Martins; R–Great Neck
- Registration: 40.4% Democratic; 28.4% Republican; 26.3% No party preference
- Demographics: 57% White; 8% Black; 15% Hispanic; 18% Asian
- Population (2017): 323,318
- Registered voters: 234,469

New York's 7th State Senate district is one of 63 districts in the New York State Senate. It has been represented by Republican Jack Martins since 2023, following his defeat of incumbent Democrat Anna Kaplan. In 2026, he announced he would not run for re-election.

== Geography ==
District 7 covers northwestern Nassau County on Long Island. It is based in the town of North Hempstead, but also reaches into small areas of Hempstead and Oyster Bay.

The district overlaps with New York's 3rd, 4th, and 5th congressional districts, and with the 13th, 15th, 16th, 19th, and 22nd districts of the New York State Assembly.

== Recent election results ==
=== 2026 ===
2026 New York State Senate election, District 7
Party	Candidate	Votes	%
Republican	Jake Blumencranz		
Conservative	Jake Blumencranz		
Total	Jake Blumencranz		
Democratic	Rory Lancman		
Write-in			
Total votes			

=== 2024 ===
2024 New York State Senate election, District 7
Primary election
Party	Candidate	Votes	%
Democratic	Kim Keiserman	7,143	75.1
Democratic	Brad Schwartz	2,314	24.3
Write-in		59	0.6
Total votes		9,516	100.0
General election
Republican	Jack Martins	82,154	
Conservative	Jack Martins	6,099	
Total	Jack Martins (incumbent)	88,253	55.1
Democratic	Kim Keiserman	71,700	44.8
Write-in		251	0.1
Total votes		160,204	100.0
Republican hold			

=== 2022 ===
2022 New York State Senate election, District 7
Primary election
Party	Candidate	Votes	%
Democratic	Anna Kaplan (incumbent)	11,482	85.5
Democratic	Jeremy Joseph	1,940	14.4
Write-in		12	0.1
Total votes		13,434	100.0
General election
Republican	Jack Martins	60,372	
Conservative	Jack Martins	4,903	
Total	Jack Martins	65,275	53.2
Democratic	Anna Kaplan	55,243	
Working Families	Anna Kaplan	2,204	
Total	Anna Kaplan (incumbent)	57,447	46.8
Write-in		36	0.0
Total votes		122,758	100.0
Republican gain from Democratic			

=== 2020 ===
2020 New York State Senate election, District 7
Party	Candidate	Votes	%
Democratic	Anna Kaplan	84,635	
Working Families	Anna Kaplan	3,319	
Independence	Anna Kaplan	1,269	
SAM	Anna Kaplan	64	
Total	Anna Kaplan (incumbent)	89,287	57.4
Republican	Dave Franklin	60,830	
Conservative	Dave Franklin	5,340	
Total	Dave Franklin	66,170	42.6
Write-in		49	0.0
Total votes		155,506	100.0
Democratic hold			

=== 2018 ===
2018 New York State Senate election, District 7
Party	Candidate	Votes	%
Democratic	Anna Kaplan	60,969	
Working Families	Anna Kaplan	1,120	
Women's Equality	Anna Kaplan	588	
Total	Anna Kaplan	62,677	55.1
Republican	Elaine Phillips	46,115	
Conservative	Elaine Phillips	3,959	
Independence	Elaine Phillips	771	
Reform	Elaine Phillips	230	
Total	Elaine Phillips (incumbent)	51,075	44.9
Write-in		26	0.0
Total votes		113,778	100.0
Democratic gain from Republican			

=== 2016 ===
2016 New York State Senate election, District 7
Party	Candidate	Votes	%
Republican	Elaine Phillips	62,030	
Conservative	Elaine Phillips	5,961	
Independence	Elaine Phillips	1,497	
Reform	Elaine Phillips	393	
Total	Elaine Phillips	69,881	51.2
Democratic	Adam Haber	64,037	
Working Families	Adam Haber	1,769	
Women's Equality	Adam Haber	798	
Total	Adam Haber	66,604	48.8
Write-in		55	0.0
Total votes		136,540	100.0
Republican hold			

=== 2014 ===
2014 New York State Senate election, District 7
Party	Candidate	Votes	%
Republican	Jack Martins	34,636	
Conservative	Jack Martins	4,193	
Independence	Jack Martins	1,365	
Tax Revolt Party	Jack Martins	271	
Total	Jack Martins (incumbent)	40,465	56.2
Democratic	Adam Haber	28,045	
Working Families	Adam Haber	1,714	
Women's Equality	Adam Haber	754	
Green	Adam Haber	679	
Total	Adam Haber	31,552	43.8
Write-in		30	0.0
Total votes		72,047	100.0
Republican hold			

=== 2012 ===
2012 New York State Senate election, District 7
Party	Candidate	Votes	%
Republican	Jack Martins	49,647	
Conservative	Jack Martins	5,837	
Independence	Jack Martins	2,173	
Tax Revolt Party	Jack Martins	382	
Total	Jack Martins (incumbent)	58,039	51.8
Democratic	Daniel Ross	51,419	
Working Families	Daniel Ross	2,568	
Total	Daniel Ross	53,987	48.2
Write-in		20	0.0
Total votes		112,046	100.0
Republican hold			

=== Federal results in District 7 ===
Year	Office	Results
2020	President	Biden 56.9 – 41.8%
2016	President	Clinton 55.0 – 42.2%
2012	President	Obama 53.8 – 45.2%
2012	Senate	Gillibrand 64.0 – 34.9%
