= Daniel Norber =

American politician (born 1979)

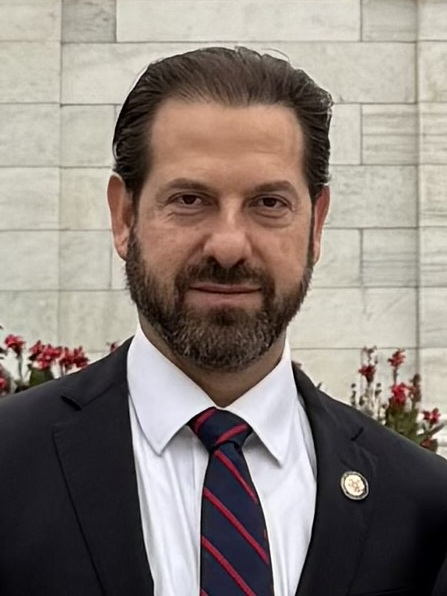
- Norber in 2025

Member of the New York State Assembly from the 16th district
- Incumbent
- Assumed office January 1, 2025
- Preceded by: Gina Sillitti

Personal details
- Born: October 14, 1979 (age 47) United States
- Party: Republican
- Children: 4
- Education: Reichman University (BA)
- Website: nyassembly.gov/mem/Daniel-J-Norber/bio/

Daniel Jacob Norber (born October 14, 1979) is an American politician serving in the New York State Assembly for the 16th district. His district includes the northwestern Nassau County communities of Great Neck, Manhasset, Port Washington, Roslyn, and several other communities along the county's border with Queens.

In 2024, he became the first Republican elected to a New York State Assembly seat in the Town of North Hempstead in over half a century by unseating Democrat Gina L. Sillitti.

== Early life and education ==
Norber was born in the United States and raised in Ra'anana, Israel. He graduated with a bachelor’s degree in government, diplomacy and strategy from Reichman University in Herzliya, Israel. His grandparents survived the Holocaust, and his mother escaped Communism in the Soviet Union. He moved back to New York in 2001.

== Career ==
Norber is a veteran of the Israel Defense Forces. He was drafted into the IDF at age 17 as a lone soldier and served as a staff sergeant in the military police.

In 2023, Norber attempted to run for Congress in the New York's 3rd congressional district's special election to replace the ousted George Santos. His candidacy in the Republican primary was withdrawn.

=== State Assembly ===
In 2024, Norber decided to run for election in the New York State Assembly. He narrowly defeated two-term Democratic incumbent Gina Silitti to win the New York State's 16th Assembly seat.

== Election results ==
2024 New York State's 16th Assembly District General Election
Party	Candidate	Votes	%
Democratic	Gina Sillitti	34,104	46.6%
Republican	Daniel Norber	32,722	44.7%
Conservative	Daniel Norber	2,120	2.9%
Total	Daniel Norber	34,842	47.6%
Write-in		111	0.2%
Blank ballots		4,071	5.6%
Total votes		73,149	100.0%

== Personal life ==
Norber resides in Great Neck, New York, He is Jewish.

== See also ==
- Mazi Melesa Pilip

New York State Assembly
Preceded by Gina Sillitti	New York State Assembly, 16th District; January 1, 2025 – present	Incumbent
