= Manhasset Secondary School =

Public school in New York state, U.S.

Location
- 200 Memorial Place; Manhasset, Nassau County, New York 11030; United States; 40°47′35″N 73°42′15″W

Information
- School type: Public Middle School and High School
- Motto: Excellence Through Effort
- Established: 1920 (school); 1935–36 (current campus)
- School district: Manhasset Union Free School District
- Superintendent: Christopher J. Pellettieri (Interim)
- CEEB code: 333010
- NCES School ID: 361827001650
- Principal: Richard Roder
- Faculty: 144.16 (FTE)
- Grades: 7–12 (Middle/Jr. H.S.: 7–8) (Sr. H.S.: 9–12)
- Gender: Co-educational
- Enrollment: 1,492 (as of 2020–21)
- Student to teacher ratio: 10.35:1
- Schedule: Monday-Friday, 8:13am-3:08pm
- Classrooms: ~80 Classrooms
- Colors: Orange and blue
- Song: "O' Stately Tower of Manhasset"
- Athletics conference: NYSPHSAA Section VIII
- Team name: Manhasset (or 'Set)
- Publication: Manhasset Media (newspaper); The Phoenix (literary magazine)
- Yearbook: Tower
- Website: manhassetschools.org

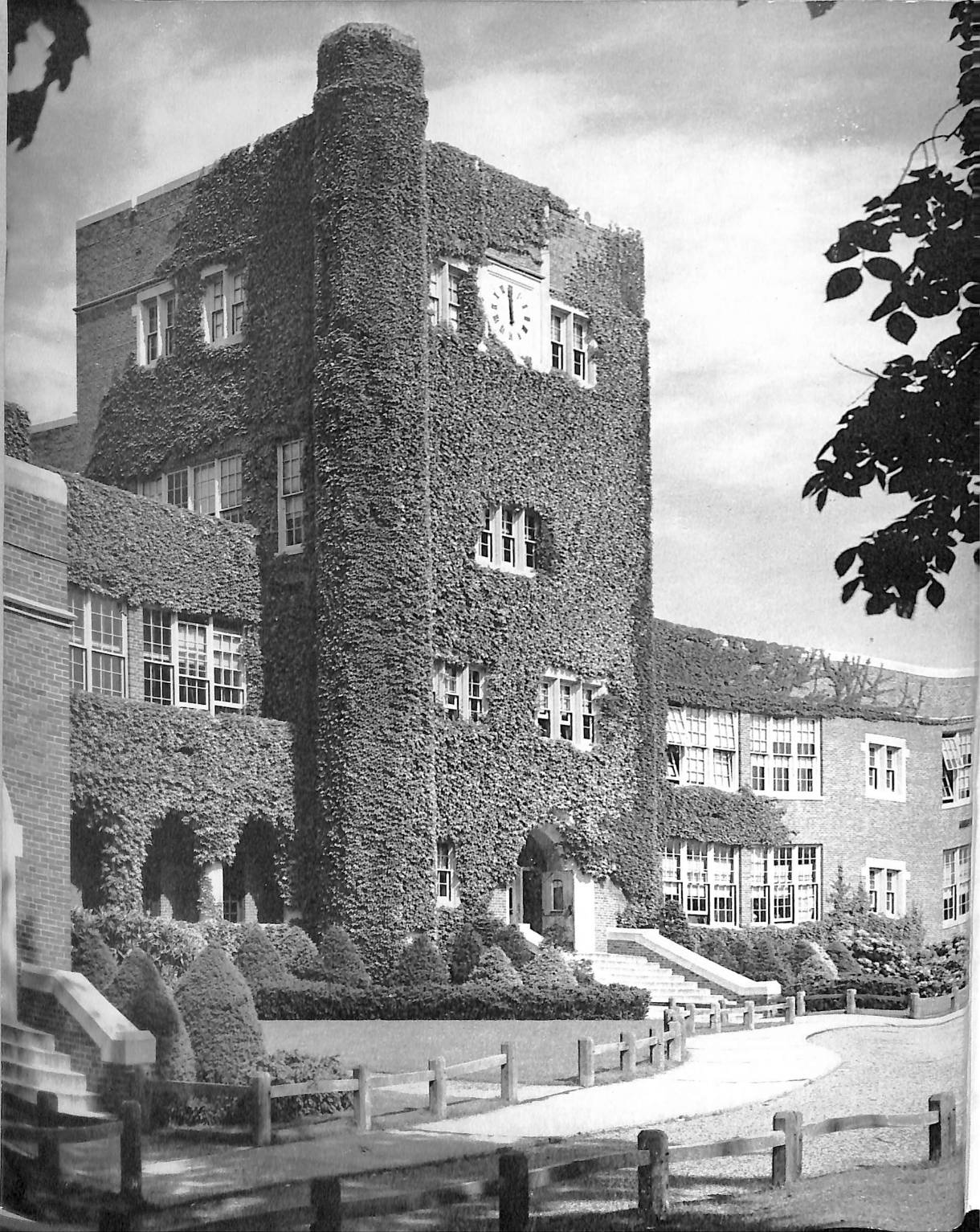
The school's tower as seen in the 1953 Tower yearbook

Manhasset Secondary School, also referred to as Manhasset Junior/Senior High School (Note: The terms Junior High School and Senior High School, as well as the combined designation Junior/Senior High School, are not often used in common reference, but remain current, e.g., in school board documents and formal contracts.) or simply Manhasset High School, (Note: "Manhasset High School" is used in reference to the building as a whole and to the 9–12 program; "Manhasset Middle School" refers to the 7–8 program as well as to the sections of the building used mostly for 7th and 8th grade teaching.) is a six-year comprehensive public middle and high school in Manhasset, New York, on the North Shore of Long Island. The 7–12 school is the only secondary school in the Manhasset Union Free School District.

As for the 2024-25 school year, the school had a total enrollment of 1,579 students, with 136.6 classroom teachers on FTE basis for a student-teacher ratio of 11.55:1. 114 students (7.6%) were eligible for free lunch while 9 (0.6%) were eligible for reduced-price lunch.

== History ==
Though the Manhasset school district gained the authority to operate a high school in 1866, a high school program would not begin until the 1920–21 school year, with the first classes being taught at the Plandome Road School (already in use at that time as an elementary school); two students were graduated from the inaugural class of 1921. Manhasset students were previously authorized to study at Flushing High School or in Great Neck per inter-district agreements. After a plot near the Plandome Road School was acquired from the Thompson family in 1934, the current Manhasset High School building, a Works Progress Administration project, began construction in 1935, with the John H. Eisele Company winning the bid for the contract to execute the school's Tudor revival created by architectural firm Tooker & Marsh with associate architect Roger H. Bullard. The building's first year in use was 1935–36, while it was still under construction; students in the 9th grade and below remained at the Plandome Road School for that academic year. The new building was completed in December 1936, with a dedication ceremony taking place on November 19, 1936. A quickly-growing school population created a need for expansion, and the building has been extended multiple times, with the first new addition coming in 1941.

== Geography ==
Manhasset High School is situated on a hill directly to the east of the opening of Manhasset Bay, in the western part of the Manhasset School District. The school is located near the Manhasset train station, Manhasset Valley Park and the site of the former Plandome Road School (now Mary Jane Davies Green).

== Academics and rankings ==
Manhasset High School has a 98% four-year graduation rate according to 2017–2021 data, coming in significantly ahead of the New York state average of 86%. In Manhasset's cohort of student entering in 2017, 86% of students were graduated in 2021 with a Regents Diploma with Advanced Designation, 10% with a regular Regents Diploma and 1% with a Local Diploma. 2% remained enrolled for a fifth year while one student dropped out without a diploma. 26 Advanced Placement (AP) courses were offered at Manhasset in 2020–21, with 522 students sitting for 1,406 exams in that school year, including approximately 75% of 12th grade students. 94% of class of 2021 graduates enrolled in a four-year college, 3% entered a two-year college, the military or another postgraduate program, and 3% did not continue their education beyond high school. Manhasset High School was recognized as a National Blue Ribbon School in 2019.

In the U.S. News & World Report 2022 ranking of U.S. high schools, Manhasset High School was ranked 215th nationally, 24th in New York state, 35th in the New York City metropolitan area and 78th on the ranking of STEM schools. In Niche's 2022 rankings, Manhasset High School placed 69th in the ranking of best public high schools nationwide, 11th in its ranking of public high schools in New York state, 18th in the New York City metropolitan area and 4th in Nassau County.

== Demographics ==
According to the American Community Survey Education Tabulation (ACS-ED) for 2015–19, the Manhasset UFSD has a population of 16,847 residents total across 5,547 households. The median household income of all residents is $207,198, with 5.7% below the poverty line and 0.5% receiving SNAP benefits. 90.6% of dwellings are houses while 9.6% are apartments or some other form of lodging. 91.5% of households have access to broadband internet.

Among public school parents, the median household income is $250,001, and 78.2% of parents are in the labor force. 89.9% of public school households live in dwellings owned by the householder, while 10.1% are renters. 82.8% of public school parents in Manhasset have a bachelor's degree or greater, 10.8% have some college or an associate's degree, 5.6% have only a high school diploma or equivalent and 0.8% did not complete high school or earn an equivalent qualification. Of the district's 3,051 students (as of the 2020–21 school year), 222 (7.3%) qualified for free lunch, while 17 (0.6%) were eligible for reduced-price lunch. 76.1% of the enrolled children speak only English at home, another 20% speak English well while speaking another language at home and 3.9% speak English less than well. 1.7% of students are recognized as having a disability and 97.2% have health insurance coverage.

According to the ACS-ED and National Center for Education Statistics, the estimated racial/ethnic identification makeup of the residents of the area generally as well as the school district's enrolled students specifically is as follows: (Note: The data from the ACS-ED are for estimates for 2015–19, while the NCES data are for 2020–21.)

Category	Shelter Rock	Munsey Park	Middle School	High School	All Students (Note: The number of students included in this report and the overall enrollment reports for each school different are consistent, but differ from the total district enrollment figure.)	All Residents
American Indian/Alaska Native	0 (0%)	0 (0%)	0 (0%)	0 (0%)	0 (0%)	6 (0.1%)
Asian	201 (30.9%)	214 (24.2%)	131 (25.4%)	214 (21.9%)	760 (25.1%)	2,850 (16.9%)
Black	23 (3.5%)	20 (2.3%)	16 (3.1%)	24 (2.5%)	83 (2.7%)	571 (3.4%)
Hispanic (Note: Those who identify as being of Hispanic ethnicity may also identify as being of any race, but in these figures, anyone who identifies as Hispanic is counted once, in this category only.)	60 (9.2%)	71 (8%)	44 (8.5%)	57 (5.8%)	232 (7.7%)	1,358 (8.1%)
Native Hawaiian/Pacific Islander	0 (0%)	0 (0%)	0 (0%)	0 (0%)	0 (0%)	0 (0%)
White	341 (52.5%)	543 (61.5%)	314 (60.9%)	670 (68.6%)	1,868 (61.8%)	11,723 (69.6%)
Some other race alone (Note: This category is included in the ACS-ED, but not the NCES report.)	—	—	—	—	—	43 (0.4%)
Two or more races (Note: Persons identifying with two or more races are not included in the count of any of the other categories, except for "Hispanic".)	25 (3.8%)	35 (4%)	11 (2.1%)	11 (1.1%)	82 (2.7%)	296 (1.8%)
Total	650 (100%)	883 (100%)	516 (100%)	976 (100%)	3,025 (100%)	16,847 (100%)

== Athletics ==
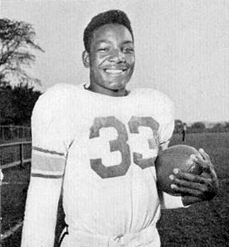
Pro and College Football Hall of Famer Jim Brown was a multi-sport athlete at Manhasset High School, where he played on the varsity football, basketball, track, baseball and lacrosse teams.

Manhasset High School participates in interscholastic athletic competitions as a member of NYSPHSAA Section VIII, competing against other schools from Nassau County. School sports in Nassau County are divided into three seasons (fall, winter and spring); Manhasset High School currently competes in the following sports:

Manhasset High School Varsity Sports (Note: All sports are separated into boys' and girls' with both teams competing in the same season unless otherwise noted.)
Fall	Winter	Spring
Badminton (Boys); Cheerleading (Co-ed; with football); Cross Country; Field Hockey (Girls); Football (Boys); Soccer; Swimming and Diving (Girls); Tennis (Girls); Volleyball	Basketball; Bowling (Note: The boys' and girls' bowling teams practice together and compete separately on a coordinated schedule.); Cheerleading (Co-ed; competitive season); Fencing (Note: The boys' and girls' fencing teams practice together and compete separately on a coordinated schedule.); Indoor Track; Swimming and Diving (Boys); Wrestling (Boys)	Badminton (Girls); Baseball (Boys); Golf; Lacrosse; Softball (Girls); Track and Field; Tennis (Boys)

In addition to the varsity sports offered, there are two club sports, crew and ice hockey.

Manhasset was the first high school on Long Island to introduce lacrosse at the team's founding in 1932. The sport would grow in popularity in the area over the coming decades, with Long Island overtaking Maryland as the top region for high school lacrosse in the United States by the 1960s. Many top college lacrosse players have been recruited from Long Island high schools, including Manhasset. Manhasset High School's chief historical rival in lacrosse is Garden City High School, against whom Manhasset's games are termed the Woodstick Classic, of which at least one has been played each season since 1935, except in 2020 (when the season was cancelled due to the COVID-19 pandemic).

=== Mascot controversy ===
The varsity sports teams at Manhasset High School are known as the Indians. The name dates back to at least 1939, when it was used to refer to Manhasset sports teams in the Tower yearbook. An earlier edition of The Tower, only referred to the school's athletic teams are as "The Orange and Blue", an appellation also used for them in 1939 alongside "Indians". At that time and in the 1952 yearbook, no visual representation of the "Indians" appeared on team uniforms; however, the 1952 edition features many stereotypical Native cartoons. A generic depiction of a Plains headdress appears on at least some of the team uniforms by 1969. The Manhasset High School class of 1997 gave a gift of a cigar store Indian-style statute, which was installed in a central corridor of the school.

In 2001, New York State Commissioner of Education Richard P. Mills recommended that public schools in New York to stop using Indian mascots and team names. After consultation with a local focus group, the Manhasset UFSD chose not to make any changes.

As of 2020, Manhasset teams used a mixture of an "M with a feather" logo and an "Indian head" logo, usually rendered as a color variant of the Washington team logo. In 2020, Manhasset resident and Manhasset High School alumna Jo Trigg created a petition demanding that Manhasset cease to use the "Indians" name and mascot. At the request of the school district which wanted only local input, the Manhasset Justice Initiative (MJI) created a similar petition only people affiliated to Manhasset-affiliated. Butera announced a public hearing in 2020 and promised that the school would abandon the Redskins-like logo in favor of the "M with a feather."

At meeting, MJI representatives, regional Native people and Manhasset residents, students, and alumni voiced their opinions on the team name and mascot. Opponents cited the NCAA's decision to discontinue the use of Indigenous group-related names without the approval of local tribes. Only 5 of 29 Manhasset-affiliated commentators voiced support for the mascot.

On January 7, 2021, Butera announced that the Manhasset School District would act on a suggestion from Brewster-Walker and form a committee comprising students, community members, and Indigenous representatives to review the school's use of Native imagery and symbols. With no committee conclusions delivered after five months, 35 graduating Manhasset High School seniors wrote a letter to the board of education accusing the school of covertly phasing out the old mascot without consultation with the community. By this time, the "Indian head" logo had been replaced by the "M with a feather" on team uniforms and in a number of locations around the school.

Manhasset teams continued to use the "Indians" name (as well as uniforms in some cases reading simply "Manhasset") and "M with a feather" logo as their identity through the 2021–22 season and no announcement of any decision made by a committee to review the use of Indigenous symbols and imagery has been made as of August 19, 2022. Meanwhile, in upstate New York, the Cambridge Central School District in Cambridge, New York was ordered by State Education Commissioner Betty A. Rosa to cease use of a similar "Indians" name and mascot by the end of the 2021–22 school year, as she found it inhibited a "a safe and supportive environment" for students; local opponents of the change are contesting the decision. In 2021, a bill was introduced in the New York State Legislature which would force non-Native schools with Indigenous-based team names to abandon their mascot by the 2024–25 school year, but it did not receive a floor vote during the 2021–22 legislative session.

On November 17, 2022, the New York State Department of Education issued a memo prohibiting the use of Native American mascots by schools without approval from a federally or state-recognized tribe and stating that any district not in compliance by the end of the 2022–23 school year may risk being found in willful violation of the Dignity for All Students Act, with penalties including the potential removal of school officers and withholding of funds.

In 2023, the Manhasset Union Free School District voted in 2023 to discontinue use of the Indians name and associated imagery after the 2023–24 school year and launched a community consultation to determine what name should be adopted. On June 11, 2024, Superintendent Gaurav Passi announced that, after consultation with the community, no new mascot would be adopted, and that the teams would be identified simply as Manhasset or 'Set.

== Performing and fine arts ==
Students must pass at least one class in the arts in order to receive a Regents Diploma from Manhasset High School. Manhasset Secondary School has many offerings, both curricular and extracurricular, in the musical, theatrical and visual arts.

There are four separate curricular instrumental ensembles (Concert Orchestra, Symphonic Orchestra, Concert Band and Symphonic Wind Ensemble) and three curricular choral groups (Symphonic Choir, Women's Choir and Men's Choir), as well as keyboard and music theory classes on offer. In addition, Manhasset has five extracurricular vocal ensembles: Vocal Jazz Ensemble, Select Ensemble, Kinsmen (an extracurricular men's choir), the Long Island Sounds and the Shirley Tempos (two a cappella groups). Manhasset's musical ensembles compete and regularly win awards at NYSSMA Majors and other competitions. Manhasset music students are regularly among the selectees for NMEA All-County, NYSSMA All-State and NAfME All-Eastern and All-National honor ensembles.

The theatre program at Manhasset High School stages two major productions each school year: a fall musical and a spring straight play, as well as additional shows performed by the repertory companies and other groups. The school offers a "Theatre in Action" course for credit as well as three levels of repertory company performance courses.

In fine art, Manhasset High School offers 23 possible course options, including AP Studio Art and AP Art History. Manhasset's fine art classes include drawing, painting, architectural drawing, computer graphics, photography and 3D design.

== Notable alumni ==
- Danny Barnes, former Major League Baseball (MLB) player and current coach
- Ted Bessell, actor
- Jim Brown, former National Football League (NFL) player, member of the Pro Football Hall of Fame and College Football Hall of Fame
- John C. Coffee, Adolf A. Berle Professor of Law at Columbia Law School
- John Gagliardi, former professional lacrosse player
- Nancy E. Gary, physician, government policy advisor and medical school professor and dean
- Dan Gurney, professional racecar driver
- Ken Howard, actor
- Theo Katzman, multi-instrumentalist, singer, songwriter and producer
- Barbara Prey, watercolor painter
- Stephen A. Lesser, architect who worked on the Faneuil Hall Marketplace
- Ira Sorkin, attorney, best known for defending Bernard Madoff
