= Nancy E. Gary =

American academic administrator

- Born: March 4, 1937; Brooklyn
- Died: May 31, 2006 (aged 69); Duke University Medical Center, Durham, North Carolina
- Education: Springfield College (Massachusetts); Woman's Medical College of the Medical College of Pennsylvania (now Drexel University College of Medicine)
- Known for: Medical school dean, government policy adviser
- Scientific career
- Fields: Medicine
- Workplaces: Meadowbrook Hospital; Georgetown University; Albany Medical College; Uniformed Services University of the Health Sciences; Educational Commission for Foreign Medical Graduates

Nancy E. Gary (March 4, 1937 – May 31, 2006) was president and chief executive officer of the Educational Commission for Foreign Medical Graduates, executive vice president of the Uniformed Services University of the Health Sciences and dean of its F. Edward Hébert School of Medicine. She was also clinical professor of medicine at George Washington University School of Medicine & Health Sciences. She was considered a change agent in medical education and "a 'powerhouse' in academic medicine."

== Early life and education ==
Gary grew up on Long Island in New York, where she graduated from Manhasset High School. She was fond of telling friends that she barely made it out of high school. She worked summers teaching archery at Rolling Hills, a nearby day camp. Her early interest in sports drew her to Springfield College in Springfield, MA, since she planned to be a gym teacher. With the first required biology course, she found her calling and switched to pre-med. She graduated cum laude with a Bachelor of Science degree in 1958 and, 35 years later, received her Distinguished Alumna Award. She received her medical degree from Woman's Medical College of Pennsylvania (now Drexel University College of Medicine), Philadelphia, Pennsylvania, in 1962, from which she received their Alumnae Achievement Award in 1990.

== Career ==
Gary began her medical career as an assistant medical resident, Meadowbrook Hospital (Nassau County Medical Center) East Meadow, Long Island, New York. She was resident physician at Saint Vincent's Catholic Medical Center in New York City. She was chief of nephrology and professor of medicine at Rutgers Medical School (now Robert Wood Johnson Medical School) University of Medicine and Dentistry of New Jersey.

Gary was appointed the dean of Albany Medical College in New York in 1988.

Senior medical advisor to the administrator of the Health Care Financing Administration (Medicare), Department of Health and Human Services.

Robert Wood Johnson Health Policy Fellow of the US House of Representatives’ Subcommittee on Health and Environment.

=== Medical licensing ===
While at the Educational Commission for Foreign Medical Graduates from 1995 to 2001, Gary enhanced the licensing process by adding a fourth examination which requires students to interview mock patients. This exam proved so successful that it was later added to the licensing requirements for US medical graduates.

== Legacy ==
She was known for her expertise in medical education, research, and practice, and was considered a mentor and role model for many women. "Part of the remarkable legacy that Nancy left was founded by pioneering and gutsy women with vision."

== Awards and honors ==
Certified by the American Board of Internal Medicine in medicine and nephrology, she was a Master in the American College of Physicians; a member of Alpha Omega Alpha; the National Board of Medicine Examiners; Editorial Board of Academic Medicine; the United States Medical Licensing Examination Composite Committee; "history maker" awardee from SELAM and the World Federation for Medical Education (WFME) Taskforce on Defining International Standards in Basic Medical Education. She received the Joseph F. Boyle, MD, Award for Distinguished Public Service in 1992. George Washington University School of Medicine and Health Sciences awarded her their Meritorious Service Award in 1995.

An avid Scrabble player, she was a member of Mensa International.
