= Stephen A. Lesser =

American architect (born 1944)

Stephen Alexander Lesser
- Born: July 15, 1944 (age 81); Bethesda, Maryland, U.S.
- Education: Columbia University (BA); Harvard Graduate School of Design (MArch)
- Occupations: Architect; educator
- Years active: 1971–present
- Known for: Faneuil Hall Marketplace
- Spouse: Celia
- Children: 3
- Awards: AIA Long Island Chapter Awards: Residential (1993), Institutional (1986), Young Firm (1993); Architectural Record – Record House; Record Interiors; Beauxarch IV – Commercial Project (1986)
- Website: www.stephenalesserarchitect.com

Stephen Alexander Lesser (born July 15, 1944) is an American architect, in practice in East Hampton, New York, specializing in modern residential and commercial buildings in the school of Le Corbusier. He is perhaps best known for his work on Faneuil Hall Marketplace project in downtown Boston, MA.

== Early life and education ==
Lesser was born in Bethesda, Maryland, the son of Virginia Hirst Lesser, a painter and teacher of art and piano, and Dr. Alexander Lesser, a Hofstra University professor of anthropology. He was raised in Manhasset, New York and graduated from Manhasset High School, where he was editor-in-chief of the literary magazine and a member of the National Honor Society. He graduated from Columbia University in 1966 with a B.A. in Social Sciences. He received a Master of Architecture from the Graduate School of Design at Harvard University in 1972.

== Career ==
Beginning in 1971, Lesser worked at several Boston firms, including The Architects Collaborative (TAC), and Perry Dean and Partners before joining Benjamin C. Thompson and Associates. There, he worked for two years on the Faneuil Hall Marketplace project.

In 1975, Lesser moved his practice to New York. He joined Richard Meier Associates where he honed his Corbusian style in residential and commercial buildings. He later joined Rivkin/Weisman, PC where he worked his way up to director. In 1986, he formed Nagel and Lesser, Architects moving to East Hampton. The practice included a broad range of residential, commercial, and industrial projects. Since 1994, he has been a sole practitioner.

=== Teaching ===
Appointments: Columbia, guest lecturer in Architecture and Planning (1992–94) New York Institute of Technology (1994-2004)

Guest Critic: Yale, Harvard, University of Pennsylvania, NYIT, Columbia, Roger Williams University

=== Licenses ===
Certified: National Council of Architectural Registration Boards, 1975

Registered: Massachusetts (1975), New York, (1981), and New Jersey (1993)

Member: AIA/National, State and AIA Peconic Chapter

== Publications ==
Architectural Review "Credit DuNord Offices" November 1982, pp 46–7

Yale Perspecta

Architectural Record "The Dubai Bank" January 1983, pp 85–91

Progressive Architecture "Bavarian Emissary" September 1984, 100-105

The New York Times "From Blueprint to Imprint" November 21, 1993

Newsday "A Carriage Trade" October 16, 1994, pp 26–27

== Awards ==
American Institute of Architecture/Long Island Chapter: Residential,(Shyer House 1993) Institutional (Camp Blue Bay 1986) and Young Firm (1993)

Architectural Record: Record House and Record Interiors

Beauxarch IV: Commercial Project (Viking Lines, 1986)

== Personal ==
Lesser lives in East Hampton with his wife, Celia, who is an attorney. They have three children: Jonathan (born '95), Emma (born '93), and Alexandra (born '88). Jon attends the Ross School in East Hampton along with his sister Emma. Alexandra graduated Hampshire College in 2010.
