= Manhasset Union Free School District =

School district in the U.S. state of New York

- Manhasset Secondary School

Address
- 200 Memorial Place Manhasset, New York, 11030; United States
- Coordinates: 40°47′34″N 73°42′16″W

District information
- Type: Union Free School District
- Motto: Excellence Through Effort
- Grades: K–12
- Established: 1813 (Common School District); 1866 (Union Free School District)
- Superintendent: Christopher Pelletieri
- School board: Ted Post (President); Nadia Giannopoulos (Vice President); Allison O'Brien Silva; Marianna Bruno; Maria Pescatore
- Schools: 3 (2 elementary, 1 secondary)
- Budget: $115,043,231 (2025–26)
- NCES District ID: 3618270

Students and staff
- Enrollment: 3,051 (2020–21)
- Faculty: 258.56 (on FTE basis)
- Staff: 198.00 non-instructional employees (FTE)
- Student–teacher ratio: 11.8
- Colors: Orange and blue

Other information
- Website: manhassetschools.org

The Manhasset Union Free School District, also known as Manhasset Public Schools, is a public school district serving the Greater Manhasset area of Nassau County, on the North Shore of Long Island, in New York. The district is a Union Free School District covering all K–12 grades, and is District No. 6 of North Hempstead, New York.

== History ==
Public schooling in North Hempstead began during the colonial period, and was similar in nature to that offered throughout Queens County at the time. By 1763, teachers in these North Hempstead schools were paid £25 and board. In 1784, the New York State Legislature created the University of the State of New York, whose Board of Regents supervises public education in the state, beginning centralized supervision of public schools. After the 1812 passage of the Common School District law, the Town of North Hempstead divided the municipality into school districts for the first time on August 19, 1813. Of the nine districts then created, the fifth, "Bottom of Cowneck", would become the modern Manhasset UFSD. The first public school building constructed for the district was a one-room schoolhouse erected in 1826 on Northern Boulevard at what is now the southeast corner of Manhasset Valley Park and the intersection of Northern Boulevard with Maple Street.

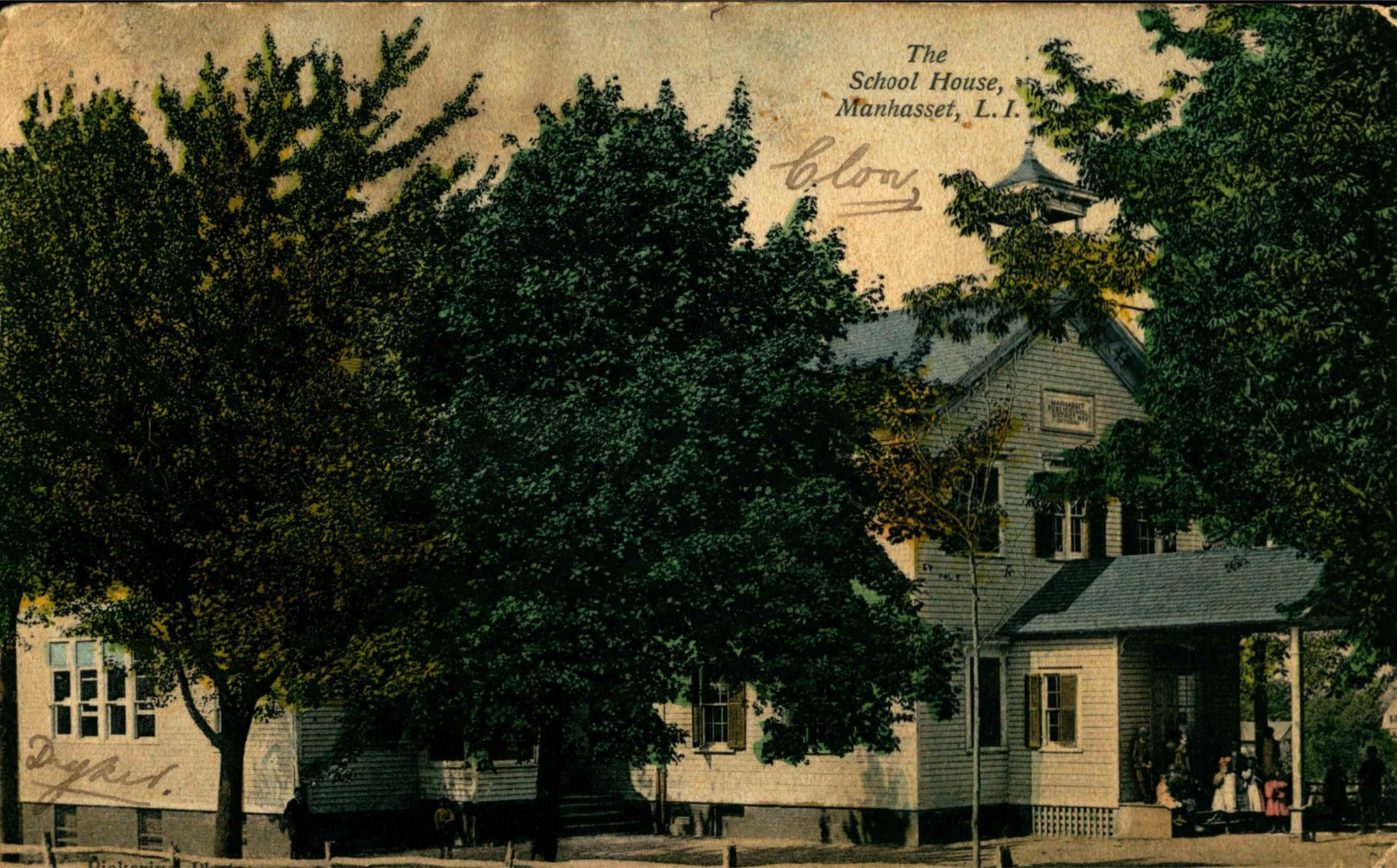
Original Plandome Road School (built 1869)

The Manhasset district, by that time renumbered No. 6 in North Hempstead after a reorganization, became a Union Free School District in 1866, with the first Manhasset school board replacing the former Common School District's trustees. Beginning in 1869, a new school building at Plandome Road and Memorial Place replaced the old schoolhouse built in 1826. The original 1826 schoolhouse remained in place, later being dedicated as part of Manhasset Valley Park in 1959 before being moved to Old Bethpage to become part of the Old Bethpage Village Restoration. After expansions in 1892 and 1899, the original Plandome Road School was demolished and a larger building was built in 1915.

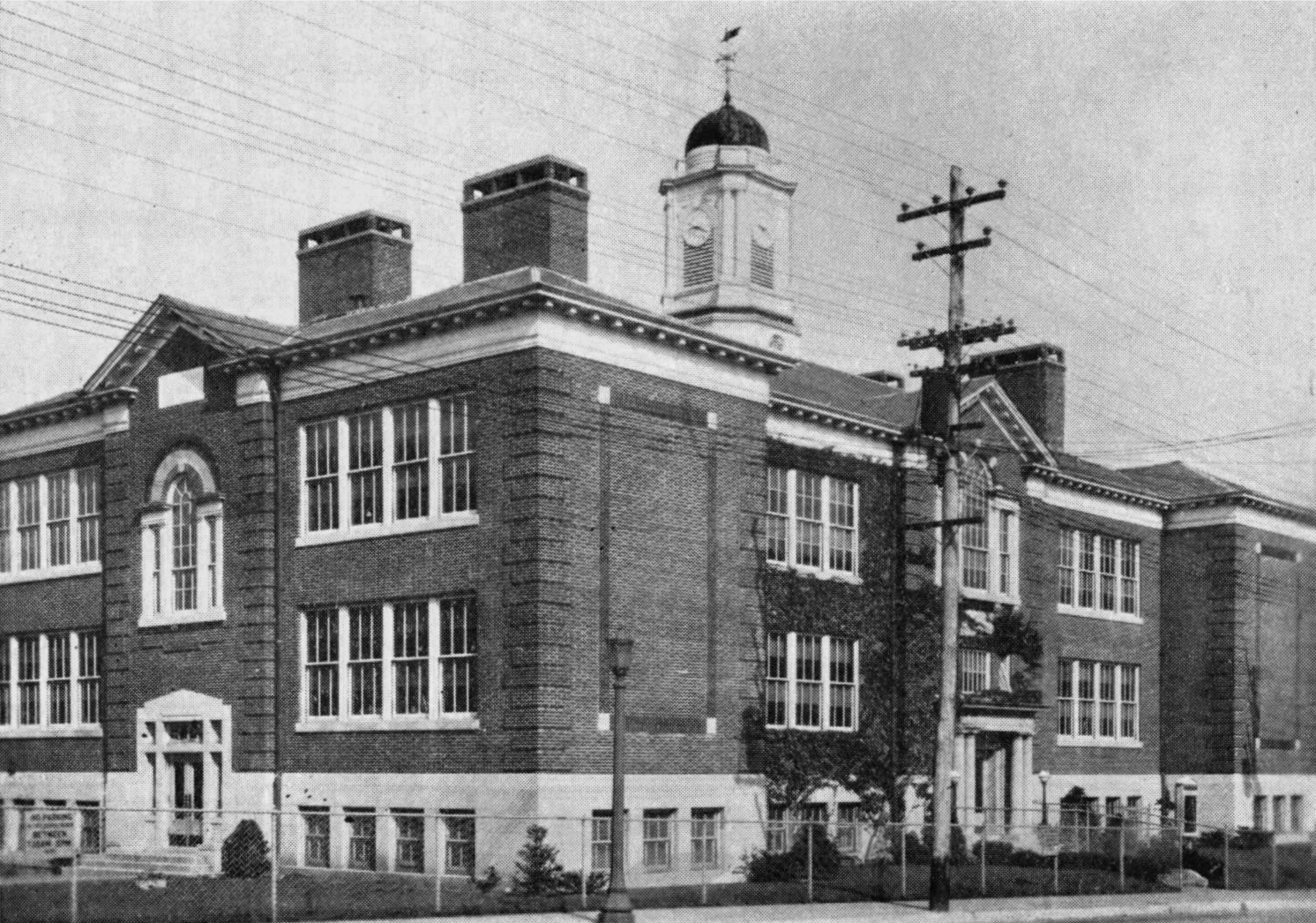
Second Plandome Road School (built 1915)

Though becoming a UFSD in 1866 authorized the Manhasset district to begin high school-level teaching, a high school program would not begin until the 1920–21 school year, with the first classes being taught at the Plandome Road School; two students were graduated from the inaugural Manhasset High School class of 1921. Manhasset students were previously authorized to study at Flushing High School or in Great Neck per inter-district agreements. After a plot near the Plandome Road School was acquired from the Thompson family in 1934, the current Manhasset High School building, a Works Progress Administration project, began construction in 1935 and was completed in December 1936. With a growing number of students, the building was extended for the first time in 1941.

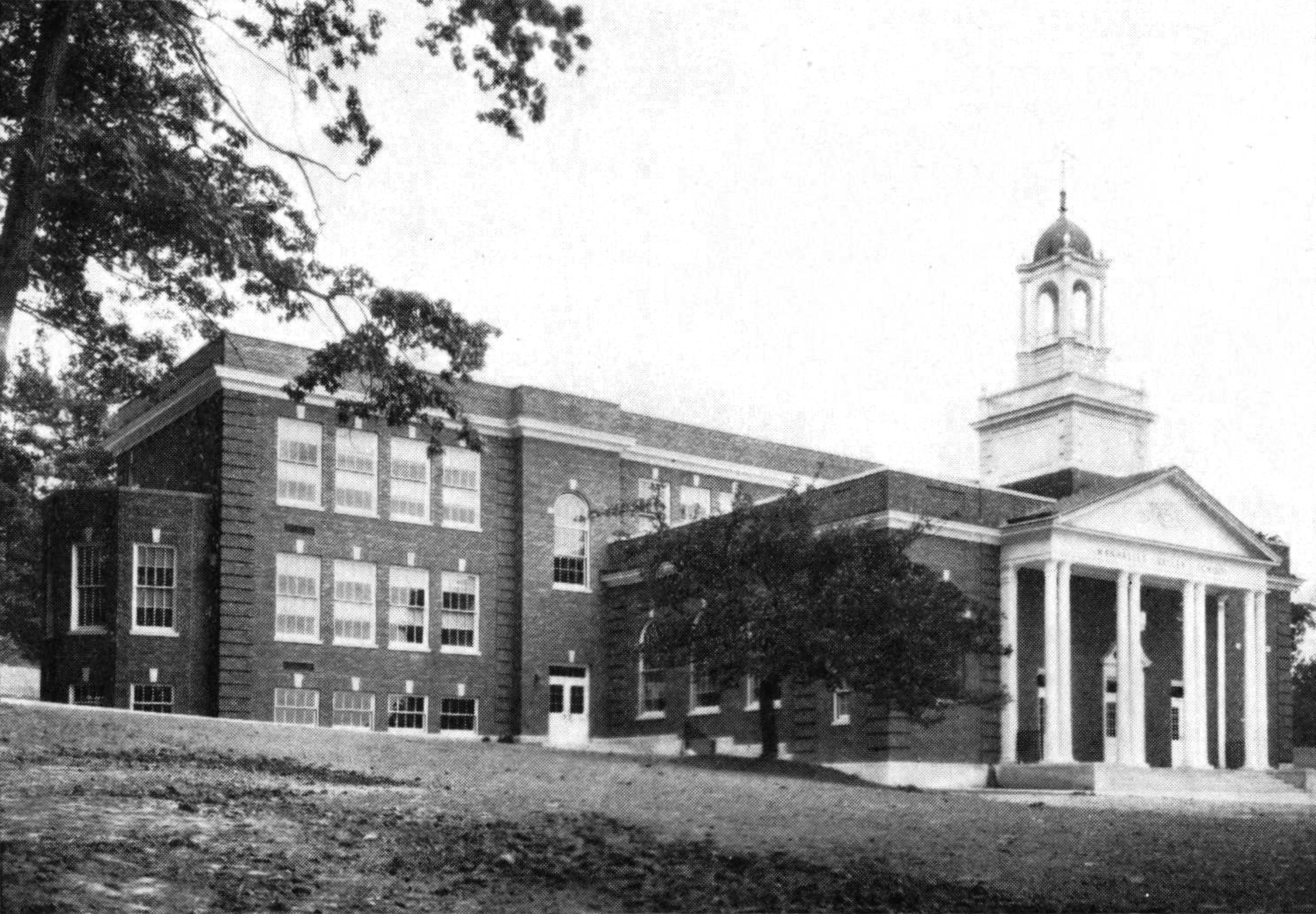
Manhasset Valley School

From the inception of the district until 1928, all elementary students were enrolled at the same school, although beginning in 1921 some classes were held in a rented store in the southern Manhasset Valley area of the district. In 1929, in response to high demand from residents, a second elementary school, the Manhasset Valley School, was opened on Spinney Hill. From 1929 onwards, the Munsey Park and Plandome areas of Manhasset saw increased luxury residential development. In 1939, Munsey Park Elementary School was opened to accommodate increased population in that portion of the district. With the opening of new elementary schools, the district was divided into attendance zones corresponding to each. In the early 1920s, when the first steps towards a separate Valley School were taken, only 7% of the area's residents were black, but this would gradually increase to over 90% by the 1950s, whereas other sections of Manhasset had very few black residents. The Spinney Hill neighborhood was near an established black community founded in Lake Success in the mid-1800s (in what was then the bordering Lakeville School District, now part of Great Neck Public Schools), including an African Methodist Episcopal Zion Church founded in 1821. The North Hempstead Housing Authority developed public housing in the Manhasset Valley area beginning in the 1940s and 1950s, which was required by law to rent "without regard to race, religion, color or national origin". It was estimated in 1962 that 83.4% of the families residing in these public housing developments were black. Meanwhile, restrictive covenants and gentlemen's agreements greatly restricted the ability of black people to live in the surrounding area.

The district was not de jure racially segregated, but by 1962, 94% of students at the Valley School were black, while no black children were enrolled the Plandome Road or Munsey Park schools in October of that school year, and all the black students who had previously attended these two schools had been the children of live-in domestics. Furthermore, socioeconomic disparities between residents of the Manhasset Valley School's attendance area and the residents of the other two rendered the parts of the school district outside of the Manhasset Valley area unaffordable for most of the families living in what was by that time a predominantly black neighborhood. The average levels of scholastic achievement at the Valley School were found to be significantly lower than at the district's other two elementary schools. As a consequence, the United States District Court for the Eastern District of New York found in Blocker v. Board of Education, 226 F. Supp. 208 (E.D.N.Y. 1964) that the Manhasset elementary school zones were de facto racially segregated. Due to the Blocker decision, the elementary school attendance zones were redrawn, with the Manhasset Valley School closing at the conclusion of the 1963–64 school year and its students being rezoned to the Plandome Road School.

In 1961, with the old Plandome Road School — by then used only as an elementary school after the construction of a dedicated high school building nearby — seen by residents of the district as insufficient to meet current needs, work began on a new elementary school building to replace it. Shelter Rock Elementary School opened for the 1968–69 school year, with its attendees being drawn from the zone of the former Plandome Road School. With the recent closure of the Manhasset Valley School, Shelter Rock became one of two active elementary schools in the district along with Munsey Park Elementary School. This arrangement remains in place today, with elementary students being zoned to either Shelter Rock or Munsey Park for grades K–6 while all students attend Manhasset Secondary School for grades 7–12.

== Demographics ==
According to the American Community Survey Education Tabulation (ACS-ED) for 2015–19, the Manhasset UFSD has a population of 16,847 residents total across 5,547 households. The median household income of all residents is $207,198, with 5.7% below the poverty line and 0.5% receiving SNAP benefits. 90.6% of dwellings are houses while 9.6% are apartments or some other form of lodging. 91.5% of households have access to broadband internet.

Among public school parents, the median household income is $250,001, and 78.2% of parents are in the labor force. 89.9% of public school households live in dwellings owned by the householder, while 10.1% are renters. 82.8% of public school parents in Manhasset have a bachelor's degree or greater, 10.8% have some college or an associate's degree, 5.6% have only a high school diploma or equivalent and 0.8% did not complete high school or earn an equivalent qualification. Of the district's 3,051 students (as of the 2020–21 school year), 222 (7.3%) qualified for free lunch, while 17 (0.6%) were eligible for reduced-price lunch. 76.1% of the enrolled children speak only English at home, another 20% speak English well while speaking another language at home and 3.9% speak English less than well. 1.7% of students are recognized as having a disability and 97.2% have health insurance coverage.

According to the ACS-ED and National Center for Education Statistics, the estimated racial/ethnic identification makeup of the residents of the area generally as well as the school district's enrolled students specifically is as follows: (Note: The data from the ACS-ED are for estimates for 2015–19, while the NCES data are for 2020–21.)

Category	Shelter Rock	Munsey Park	Middle School	High School	All Students (Note: The number of students included in this report and the overall enrollment reports for each school different are consistent, but differ from the total district enrollment figure.)	All Residents
American Indian/Alaska Native	0 (0%)	0 (0%)	0 (0%)	0 (0%)	0 (0%)	6 (0.1%)
Asian	201 (30.9%)	214 (24.2%)	131 (25.4%)	214 (21.9%)	760 (25.1%)	2,850 (16.9%)
Black	23 (3.5%)	20 (2.3%)	16 (3.1%)	24 (2.5%)	83 (2.7%)	571 (3.4%)
Hispanic (Note: Those who identify as being of Hispanic ethnicity may also identify as being of any race, but in these figures, anyone who identifies as Hispanic is counted once, in this category only.)	60 (9.2%)	71 (8%)	44 (8.5%)	57 (5.8%)	232 (7.7%)	1,358 (8.1%)
Native Hawaiian/Pacific Islander	0 (0%)	0 (0%)	0 (0%)	0 (0%)	0 (0%)	0 (0%)
White	341 (52.5%)	543 (61.5%)	314 (60.9%)	670 (68.6%)	1,868 (61.8%)	11,723 (69.6%)
Some other race alone (Note: This category is included in the ACS-ED, but not the NCES report.)	—	—	—	—	—	43 (0.4%)
Two or more races (Note: Persons identifying with two or more races are not included in the count of any of the other categories, except for "Hispanic".)	25 (3.8%)	35 (4%)	11 (2.1%)	11 (1.1%)	82 (2.7%)	296 (1.8%)
Total	650 (100%)	883 (100%)	516 (100%)	976 (100%)	3,025 (100%)	16,847 (100%)

== Schools ==
=== Current schools ===
The Manhasset Union Free School District currently operates the following schools:

- Primary (K–6)
  - Shelter Rock Elementary School
  - Munsey Park Elementary School
- Secondary (7–12)
  - Manhasset Secondary School

=== Former schools ===
The Manhasset Union Free School District used to operate the following schools:

- Original Manhasset Schoolhouse (built 1826, now moved to Old Bethpage as part of the Village Restoration museum)
- Manhasset Valley School (built 1929, building stands; now home to the Manhasset-Great Neck Equal Opportunity Council)
- Plandome Road School I (built 1869, demolished 1915)
- Plandome Road School II (built 1915, demolished c. 1960s; now the site of Mary Jane Davies Green, a public park)
