= Manhasset, New York =

Hamlet and census-designated place in US

- Hamlet and census-designated place Town Seat of North Hempstead
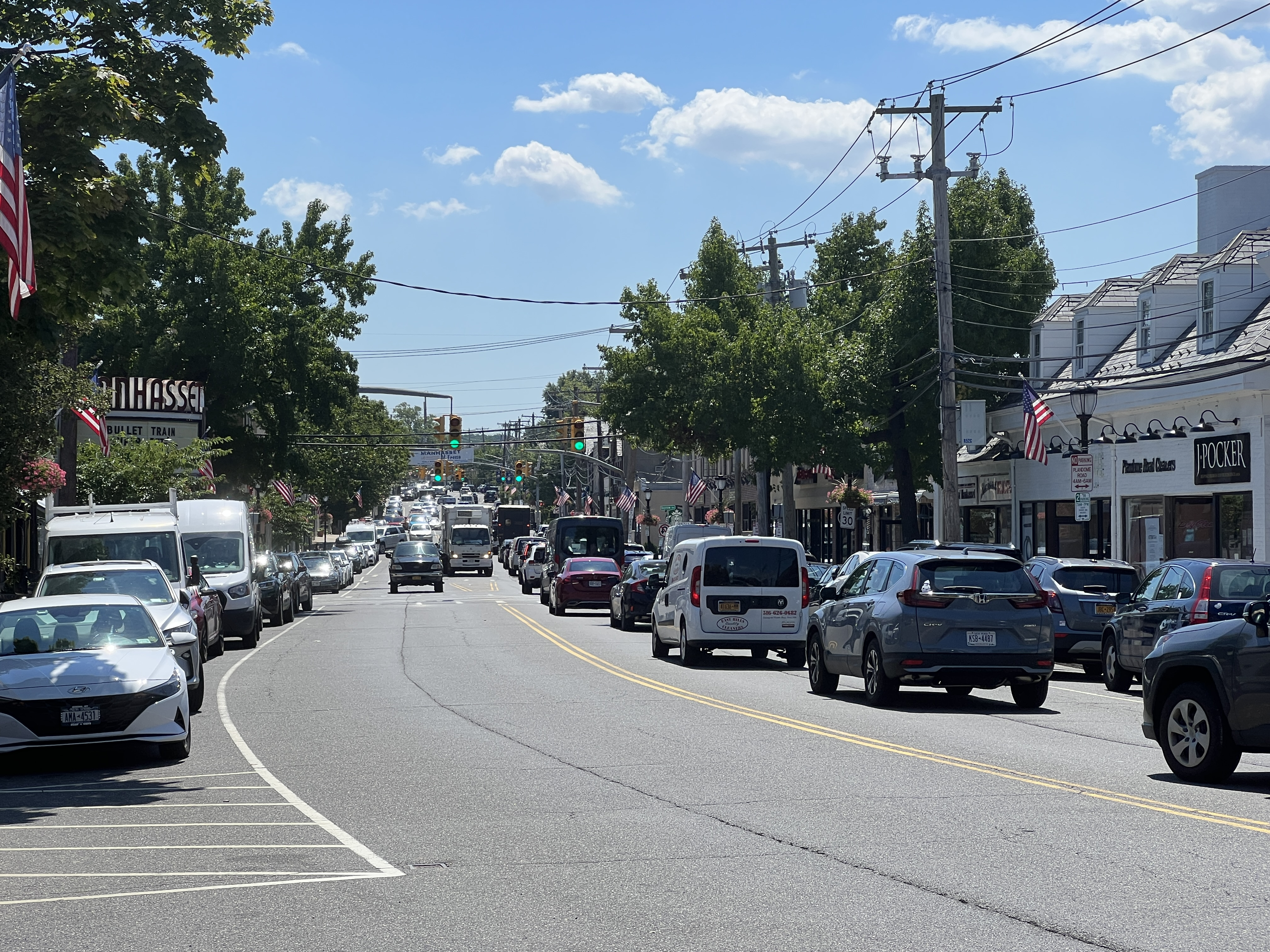
- Plandome Road in Manhasset's downtown area

- Location in Nassau County and the state of New York

- Location on Long Island Location within the state of New York
- Coordinates: 40°47′34″N 73°41′36″W
- Country: United States
- State: New York
- County: Nassau County
- Town: North Hempstead
- First settled: 1680
- Named for: "Manhanset", roughly meaning "the Island Neighborhood"; the Manhanset Tribe.

Area
  - Total: 2.42 sq mi (6.27 km^{2})
  - Land: 2.39 sq mi (6.18 km^{2})
  - Water: 0.035 sq mi (0.09 km^{2})
- Elevation: 95 ft (29 m)

Population (2020)
  - Total: 8,176
  - Density: 3,428.0/sq mi (1,323.55/km^{2})
- Time zone: UTC−5 (Eastern (EST))
  - Summer (DST): UTC−4 (EDT)
- ZIP Codes: 11030 (Manhasset); 11020, 11021 (Great Neck)
- Area codes: 516, 363
- FIPS code: 36-44897
- GNIS feature ID: 0956342
- Website: manhassetny.org

Manhasset is a hamlet and census-designated place (CDP) in Nassau County, on the North Shore of Long Island, in New York, United States. It is partially located on the southwestern part of the Cow Neck Peninsula. The population was 8,176 at the time of the 2020 census.

As with other unincorporated communities in New York, the CDP's local affairs are administered by the town in which it is located, the Town of North Hempstead.

Additionally, the hamlet serves as the town seat of North Hempstead, and North Hempstead Town Hall – the town's governmental headquarters – is located within Manhasset's downtown, along Plandome Road.

== Etymology ==
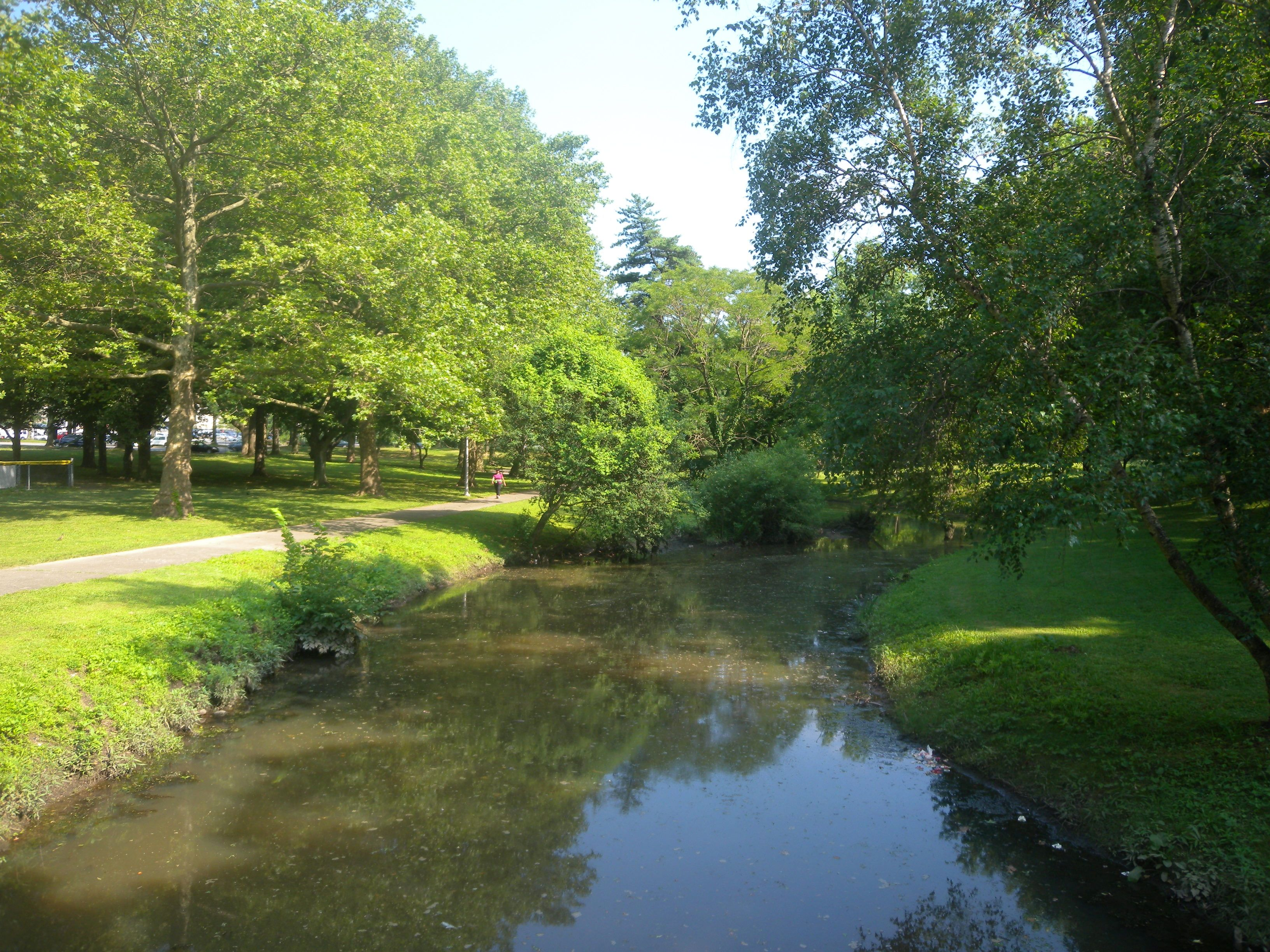
Manhasset Valley Park, formerly a minor harbor

The name Manhasset was adopted for the community in 1840. It is most likely the anglicized rendition of the name of a nearby Native American tribe whose name translates to "the island neighborhood".

== History ==
The Matinecock had a village on Manhasset Bay. These Native Americans called the area Sint Sink, meaning "place of small stones". They made wampum from oyster shells. In 1623, the area was claimed by the Dutch West India Company and they began forcing English settlers to leave in 1640. A 1643 land purchase made it possible for English settlers to return to Cow Neck (the peninsula where present-day Port Washington, Manhasset, and surrounding villages are located.).

Manhasset Bay was previously known as Schout's Bay (a schout being roughly the Dutch equivalent of a sheriff), Martin Garretson's Bay (Martin Garretson was the Schout at one point), and later Cow Bay or Cow Harbor. Cow Neck was so called because it offered good grazing land. By 1659, there were over 300 cows and 5 mi (8 km) fence separating Cow Neck from the areas to the south. The settlers came to an agreement that each of them could have one cow on the neck for each section of fence the individual had constructed. The area was more formally divided among the settlers when the fence was removed in 1677. Manhasset took on the name Little Cow Neck, Port Washington was known as Upper Cow Neck.

During the American Revolution, Little Cow Neck suffered at the hands of the British military; numerous structures and properties, such as the 1719 Quaker Meeting House, were burned, seized, or damaged. The Town of North Hempstead separated from the Town of Hempstead in 1784 because the South, inhabited mainly by Church of England members, was loyal to the king. The Northern communities and villages, dominated by Yankee Congregationalists supported independence.

In 1801, it cost two cents to travel between Roslyn and Spinney Hill on the North Hempstead Turnpike, the newly opened toll road (now Northern Boulevard).

The Manhasset name was adopted in 1840 and comes from the native word "Manhanset", roughly meaning "the island neighborhood". At this time, the inhabitants of Mahnhaset became known as the Manhasseniters. Dairy farming was still a major endeavor, but the oyster industry was also on the rise. In 1898, the Long Island Railroad arrived, bringing with it wealthy New Yorkers looking for country homes with easy transportation to more urban areas of New York City. Manhasset Valley and Spinney Hill attracted a number of skilled workers and immigrant families.

The North Hempstead Town Hall opened in Manhasset on Plandome Road in 1907. Town councilmen had previously been meeting in Roslyn taverns after North Hempstead split away from Hempstead in 1775.

The Manhasset Valley School, originally built to serve the children of the help on the local Gold Coast Estates, eventually came to serve Manhasset's African American community, and was closed in the 1960s by a desegregation lawsuit. It is still standing and is currently used as a community center. The centrally located but antiquated Plandome Road School was demolished in the early 1970s, having been replaced by the new Shelter Rock Elementary School in North Hills by 1969. Currently, Mary Jane Davies Green sits on the site of the old school.

Manhasset is served by the Nassau County Police Department, with the Sixth Precinct station house located on Community Drive, just south of Northern Boulevard. RMPs 608 and 616 are the cars assigned to patrol duties in Manhasset. In 2005, a Wall Street Journal article ranked Manhasset as the best town for raising a family in the New York metropolitan area. The Manhasset area, settled by 1680, grew quickly after it began being served by the Long Island Rail Road in 1898. The LIRR provides access to New York City via the Manhasset station with an approximately 40-minute commute to Penn Station or Grand Central. Express trains, which run during rush hour, make the trip in less than 30 minutes. The hamlet of Manhasset is located 19.5 miles (29.2 km) away from midtown Manhattan.

In the 2010s and 2020s, talks have been restarted to connect the businesses on Plandome Road to sanitary sewers operated by the Great Neck Water Pollution Control District. These proposals have been discussed for decades but historically had been met with opposition, ultimately killing some of the earlier plans.

=== Failed incorporation attempts ===
There have been several unsuccessful attempts over the years – especially throughout the 1940s – for some or all of the unincorporated areas of Manhasset to incorporate as villages. The most recent proposal to incorporate the hamlet took place in 2016.

== Geography ==
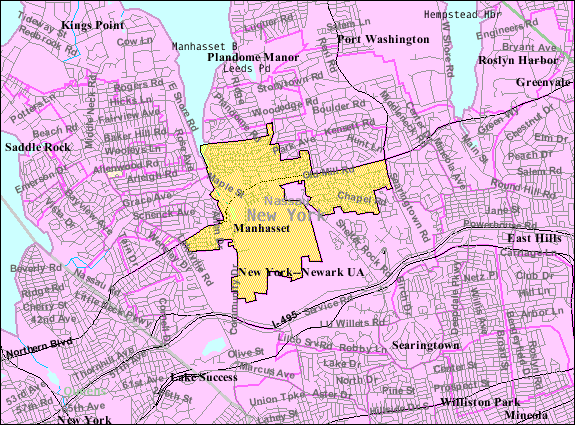
U.S. Census map of Manhasset

According to the United States Census Bureau, the CDP has a total area of 2.4 square miles (6.2 km^{2}), of which 2.4 square miles (6.2 km^{2}) is land and 0.04 square miles (0.10 km^{2}), or 1.24%, is water.

=== Topography ===
Like the rest of Long Island's North Shore, Manhasset is situated on a terminal moraine, which is named the Harbor Hill Moraine. This moraine was formed by glaciers during the Wisconsin Glacial Episode, and is named for Harbor Hill in Roslyn; Harbor Hill is the highest geographic point in Nassau County.

=== Geology ===
Manhasset is the namesake of the geologic unit of the Manhasset Formation.

=== Drainage ===
Manhasset is split among two minor drainage areas: Leeds Pond and Whitney Pond (both of which are part of the Manhasset Bay Watershed).

Furthermore, the CDP, as a whole, is located within the larger Long Island Sound/Atlantic Ocean Watershed.

=== Climate ===
Manhasset features a humid subtropical climate (Cfa) under the Köppen climate classification and is located near the transitional zone between humid subtropical and humid continental (Dfa) climates. Accordingly, the CDP experiences hot, humid summers and cold winters, and experiences precipitation throughout the entirety of the year.

Climate data for Manhasset CDP, New York
Month	Jan	Feb	Mar	Apr	May	Jun	Jul	Aug	Sep	Oct	Nov	Dec	Year
Record high °F (°C)	71 (22)	73 (23)	87 (31)	94 (34)	96 (36)	101 (38)	108 (42)	105 (41)	97 (36)	89 (32)	83 (28)	76 (24)	108 (42)
Mean daily maximum °F (°C)	40.4 (4.7)	42.9 (6.1)	51.1 (10.6)	61.2 (16.2)	70.6 (21.4)	79.6 (26.4)	84.5 (29.2)	83.3 (28.5)	76.0 (24.4)	65.4 (18.6)	55.7 (13.2)	45.1 (7.3)	63.0 (17.2)
Daily mean °F (°C)	33.4 (0.8)	35.0 (1.7)	42.0 (5.6)	51.8 (11.0)	60.8 (16.0)	70.1 (21.2)	75.2 (24.0)	74.1 (23.4)	67.2 (19.6)	56.5 (13.6)	47.8 (8.8)	38.2 (3.4)	54.3 (12.4)
Mean daily minimum °F (°C)	26.4 (−3.1)	27.1 (−2.7)	33.5 (0.8)	42.4 (5.8)	51.0 (10.6)	60.6 (15.9)	65.8 (18.8)	65.0 (18.3)	58.3 (14.6)	47.6 (8.7)	39.9 (4.4)	31.2 (−0.4)	45.7 (7.6)
Record low °F (°C)	−4 (−20)	−5 (−21)	5 (−15)	13 (−11)	34 (1)	43 (6)	50 (10)	46 (8)	38 (3)	27 (−3)	18 (−8)	−2 (−19)	−5 (−21)
Average precipitation inches (mm)	3.56 (90)	2.87 (73)	4.47 (114)	3.85 (98)	3.23 (82)	3.54 (90)	3.97 (101)	4.26 (108)	4.31 (109)	4.08 (104)	3.18 (81)	3.99 (101)	45.31 (1,151)
Average snowfall inches (cm)	5.5 (14)	7.8 (20)	3.7 (9.4)	0.3 (0.76)	0 (0)	0 (0)	0 (0)	0 (0)	0 (0)	0 (0)	0.2 (0.51)	5.7 (14)	23.2 (58.67)
Average relative humidity (%)	73	75	72	72	75	74	73	71	73	73	71	75	73
Mean monthly sunshine hours	177	153	172	167	202	213	237	241	215	190	210	171	2,348
Average ultraviolet index	2	2	2	3	5	6	6	6	5	3	2	2	4
Source: NOAA; Weather Atlas; The Weather Channel

==== Plant zone ====
According to the United States Department of Agriculture (USDA), Manhasset is located within hardiness zone 7b.

=== Greater Manhasset area ===
In addition to the unincorporated areas of Manhasset proper (Bayview, the Strathmores (North and South Strathmore, Strathmore Village, and Strathmore–Vanderbilt), Shorehaven, Terrace Manor, Manhasset Park, Manhasset Gardens, and Norgate), the Greater Manhasset area also includes three incorporated villages: Munsey Park, Plandome, and Plandome Heights; and parts of three others: Flower Hill, Plandome Manor, and North Hills.

== Economy ==
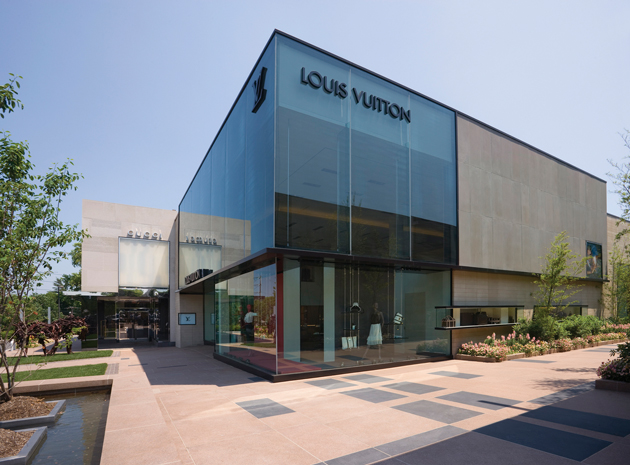
The Louis Vuitton store at Americana Manhasset

The Americana Manhasset mall opened in 1956, and is located on Manhasset's Miracle Mile.

The commercial center of Manhasset is situated around the railroad station on Plandome Road, where the LIRR connects directly into Manhattan for a 37-minute commute. The area has bakeries, pizzerias, delis, bars, coffee shops, and a movie theater. Centralized in town is a small park and a gazebo. The community's public library is located one block east of Plandome Road, on the corner of Onderdonk Avenue and Northern Boulevard, adjacent to the historic Quaker Meeting House.

Prior to the Long Island Rail Road's arrival, the commercial center of Manhasset was located in the Manhasset Valley (near the present-day Manhasset Valley Park), along Manhasset Bay.

The North American headquarters of Sabena was located in a 36,000 square feet (3,300 m^{2}) office building in Manhasset. In April 2002, Knightsbridge Properties Corp. bought the building for $4.9 million. Due to the bankruptcies of Sabena and Swissair, the real estate deal took over a year to finish. During that month, the building was 30% occupied. Sabena was scheduled to move out of the building on May 10, 2002. The buyer planned to spend an additional $2 million to convert the building into a multi-tenant, Class A office and medical facility.

== Demographics ==
Historical population
Census	Pop.	Note	%±
2000	8,362		—
2010	8,080		−3.4%
2020	8,176		1.2%
Source: census.gov

=== 2020 census ===
As of the 2020 census, Manhasset had a population of 8,176. The median age was 44.3 years. 22.9% of residents were under the age of 18 and 20.2% of residents were 65 years of age or older. For every 100 females there were 93.2 males, and for every 100 females age 18 and over there were 89.3 males age 18 and over.

100.0% of residents lived in urban areas, while 0.0% lived in rural areas.

There were 2,790 households in Manhasset, of which 36.0% had children under the age of 18 living in them. Of all households, 59.2% were married-couple households, 12.4% were households with a male householder and no spouse or partner present, and 25.9% were households with a female householder and no spouse or partner present. About 23.0% of all households were made up of individuals and 12.6% had someone living alone who was 65 years of age or older.

There were 2,947 housing units, of which 5.3% were vacant. The homeowner vacancy rate was 1.0% and the rental vacancy rate was 6.0%.

Racial composition as of the 2020 census
Race	Number	Percent
White	4,736	57.9%
Black or African American	623	7.6%
American Indian and Alaska Native	32	0.4%
Asian	1,868	22.8%
Native Hawaiian and Other Pacific Islander	1	0.0%
Some other race	302	3.7%
Two or more races	614	7.5%
Hispanic or Latino (of any race)	868	10.6%

=== 2010 census ===
As of the 2010 census, there were 8,080 people and 2,744 households residing in the census-designated place (CDP) which covers 2.38 square miles. The population density was 3,392.1 inhabitants per square mile (1,309.7/km^{2}).

There were 2,744 households, out of which 38.2% had children under the age of 18 living with them, 63.6% were married couples living together, 11.5% had a female householder with no husband present, and 22.2% were non-families. 20.9% of all households were made up of individuals, and 9.6% had someone living alone who was 65 years of age or older. The average household size was 2.80, and the average family size was 3.28. The population was spread out, with 23.9% under the age of 18 and 19.2% 65 years of age or older. The median age was 45.9 years. For every 100 females, there were 91.0 males.

=== Income and poverty ===
The median income for a household in the CDP was $133,456, and the median income for a family was $180,086. The per capita income in the CDP was $72,973. 5.5% of the population and 4.0% of families were below the poverty line. 6.3% of people under 18 years of age and 4.6% of people 65 and older had incomes below the poverty line.

== Government ==
=== Town representation ===
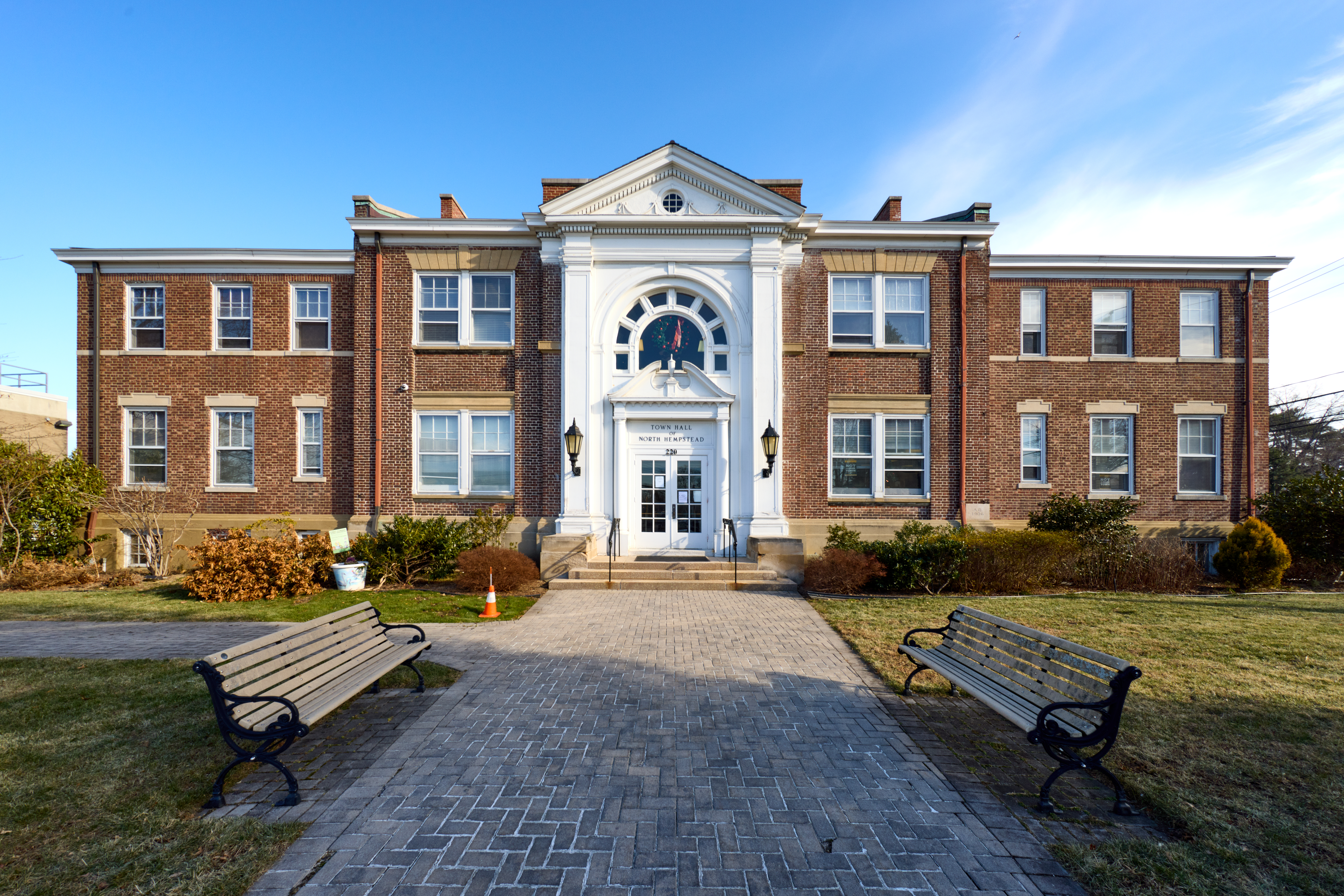
North Hempstead Town Hall in 2022

Manhasset, an unincorporated area within the Town of North Hempstead, is directly governed by said Town. It is located in the Town of North Hempstead's 5th council district, which as of March 2026 is represented by Yaron Levy (R–Harbor Hills).

Furthermore, as Manhasset is the town seat of North Hempstead, the Town's government is seated in the hamlet, and North Hempstead Town Hall is located on Plandome Road in the hamlet's downtown area.

=== Representation in higher government ===
==== County representation ====
Manhasset located within Nassau County's 10th Legislative district, which as of August 2025 is represented in the Nassau County Legislature by Mazi Melesa Pilip (R–Great Neck).

==== State representation ====
===== New York State Assembly =====
Manhasset is located in the New York State Assembly's 16th State Assembly district, which as of August 2025 is represented by Daniel J. Norber (R–Great Neck).

===== New York State Senate =====
Manhasset is located in the New York State Senate's 7th State Senate district, which as of August 2025 is represented by Jack M. Martins (R–Old Westbury).

==== Federal representation ====
===== United States House of Representatives =====
Manhasset is located entirely within New York's 3rd Congressional district, which as of August 2025 is represented in the United States Congress by Thomas R. Suozzi (D–Glen Cove).

===== United States Senate =====
Along with the rest of New York, Manhasset is represented in the United States Senate by Chuck Schumer (D) and Kirsten Gillibrand (D).

=== Politics ===
In the 2024 United States presidential election, the majority of Manhasset voters voted for Donald J. Trump (R).

Recent election results in Manhasset (CDP), New York
Year	Democratic	Republican
President
2020	49.9% 2,239	48.6% 2,183
2016	47.2% 1,845	48.6% 1,901
U.S. Senate
2018	52.3% 1,596	47.5% 1,447
2016	54.1% 2,053	44.5% 1,691
Governor
2018	50.3% 1,523	48.0% 1,452
State Attorney General
2018	49.0% 1,481	49.8% 1,506

== Parks and recreation ==
Mary Jane Davies Green, formerly the site of the Plandome Road School

The Town of North Hempstead owns and operates several parks within the hamlet. These parks include Manhasset Valley Park, Mary Jane Davies Green, and Whitney Pond Park.

=== Park districts ===
In addition to having several parks which are owned and maintained by the Town of North Hempstead, two park districts serve the majority of the hamlet: the Great Neck Park District and the Manhasset Park District.

The portion of Manhasset zoned for the Manhasset Union Free School District is located, in its entirety, within the boundaries of (and is thus served by) the Manhasset Park District. This special district owns and operates numerous parks and parking facilities throughout the Greater Manhasset area. Meanwhile, the portion of the Spinney Hill section of Manhasset zoned for the Great Neck Union Free School District is located within the boundaries of (and is thus served by) the Great Neck Park District, which owns and operates numerous parks and parking facilities throughout the Greater Great Neck area.

The only portion of the hamlet not located within either of the two park districts is the southernmost, sparsely populated tip of the hamlet.

== Education ==
=== Schools ===
Manhasset is primarily located within the boundaries of (and is thus served by) the Manhasset Union Free School District, while some of the hamlet's southernmost portions and a portion of its western panhandle are located within the boundaries of (and are thus served by) the Great Neck Union Free School District. As such, children who reside in Manhasset and attend public schools go to school in one of these two districts, depending on where they reside within the hamlet.

Several private schools, including St. Mary's High School, are also located within the hamlet.

=== Libraries ===
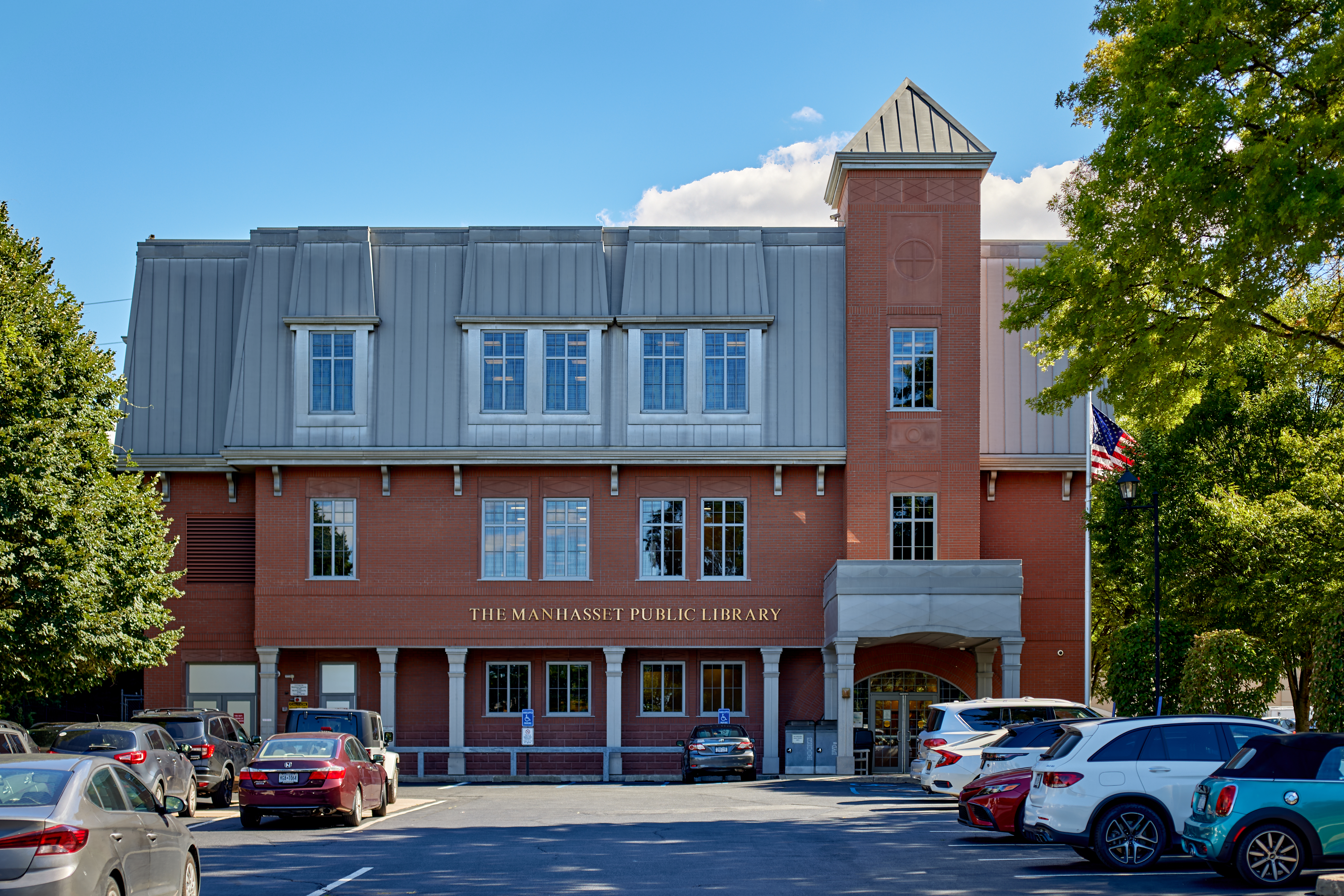
The Manhasset Public Library in 2022

Manhasset is located within the boundaries of (and is thus served by) the Great Neck Library District and the Manhasset Library District. The boundaries of these two library districts within the hamlet are coterminous with those of the school districts.

== Infrastructure ==
=== Transportation ===
==== Road ====
One state road, Northern Boulevard (NY 25A), travels through (and thus directly serves) Manhasset.

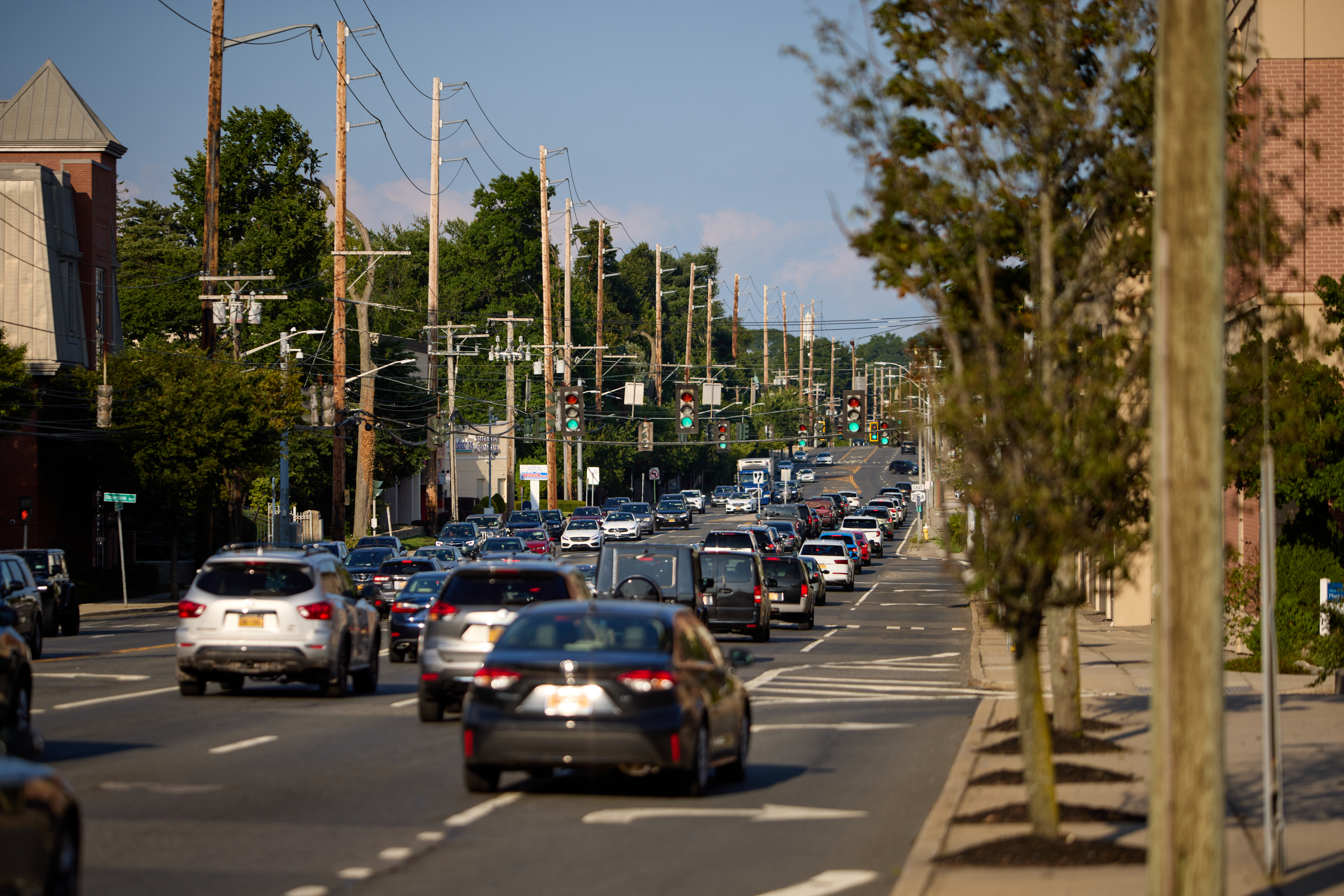
Northern Boulevard (NY 25A) in Manhasset in 2022

Other major roads which travel through the hamlet include Bayview Avenue, Community Drive, East Shore Road, Maple Street, Onderdonk Avenue, Park Avenue, Plandome Road, Searingtown Road, and Shelter Rock Road.

==== Rail ====
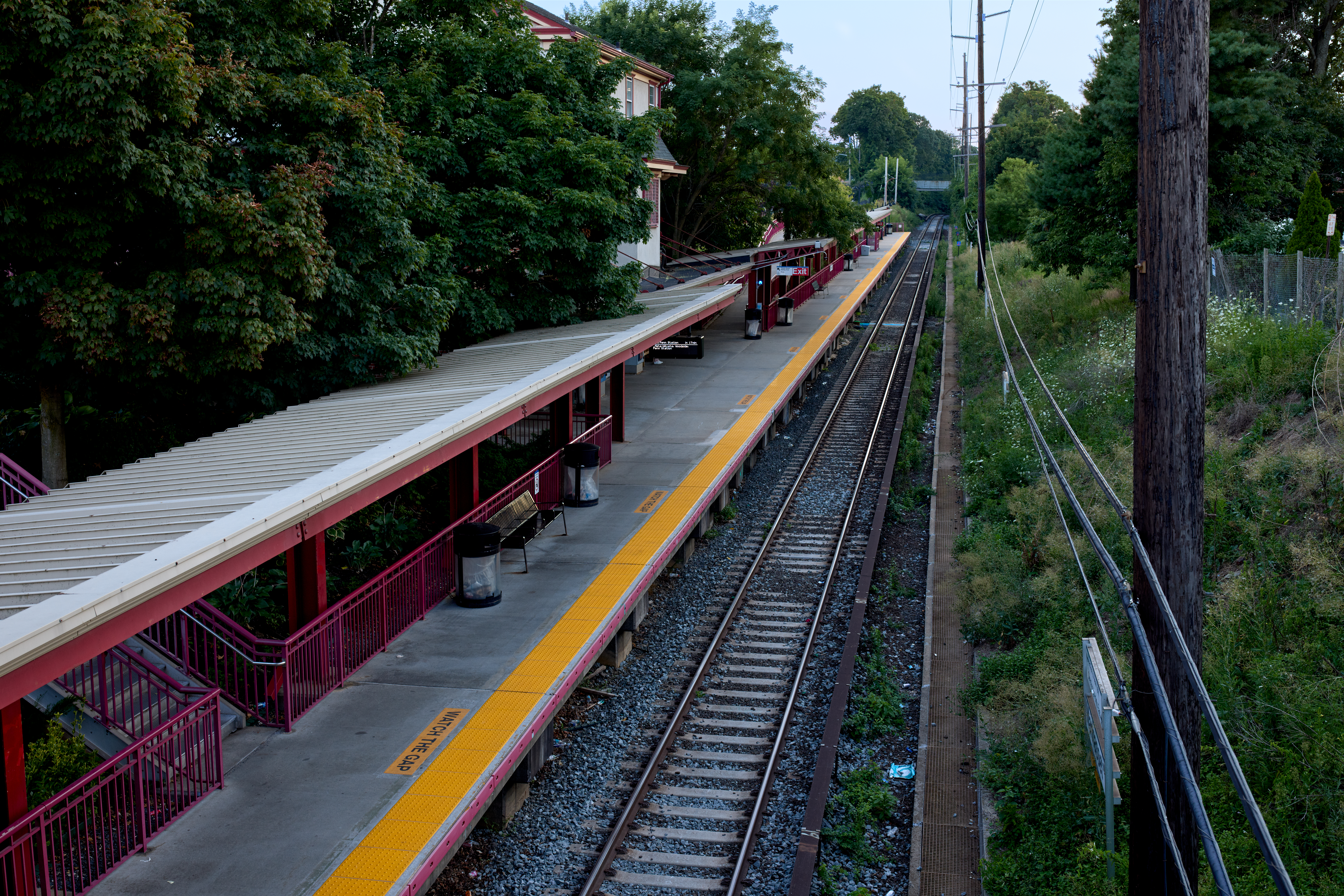
The Manhasset LIRR station in 2022

The Manhasset station on the Long Island Rail Road's Port Washington Branch is located in Manhasset's downtown area.

==== Bus ====
Manhasset is served by the n20H, n21, n25 and n26 bus routes, which are operated by Nassau Inter-County Express (NICE). The n20H and n21 run east–west through Manhasset on Northern Boulevard while the n25 and n26 pass through the western part of Manhasset en route between Great Neck and Lynbrook and Jamaica respectively.

=== Utilities ===
==== Natural gas ====
National Grid USA provides natural gas to homes and businesses that are hooked up to natural gas lines in Manhasset.

==== Power ====
PSEG Long Island provides power to all homes and businesses within the hamlet, on behalf of the Long Island Power Authority.

==== Sewage ====
Manhasset is partially sewered. The sewered areas are connected to the Great Neck Water Pollution Control District's sanitary sewer network, which handles and treats the hamlet's sanitary waste.

The remainder of the hamlet instead relies on cesspools and septic systems.

As of 2022, plans are underway to connect the hamlet's downtown area along Plandome Road to the Great Neck Water Pollution Control District's sanitary sewers.

==== Water ====
Manhasset, in its entirety, is located within the boundaries of (and is thus served by) the Manhasset–Lakeville Water District.

=== Healthcare and emergency services ===
==== Healthcare ====
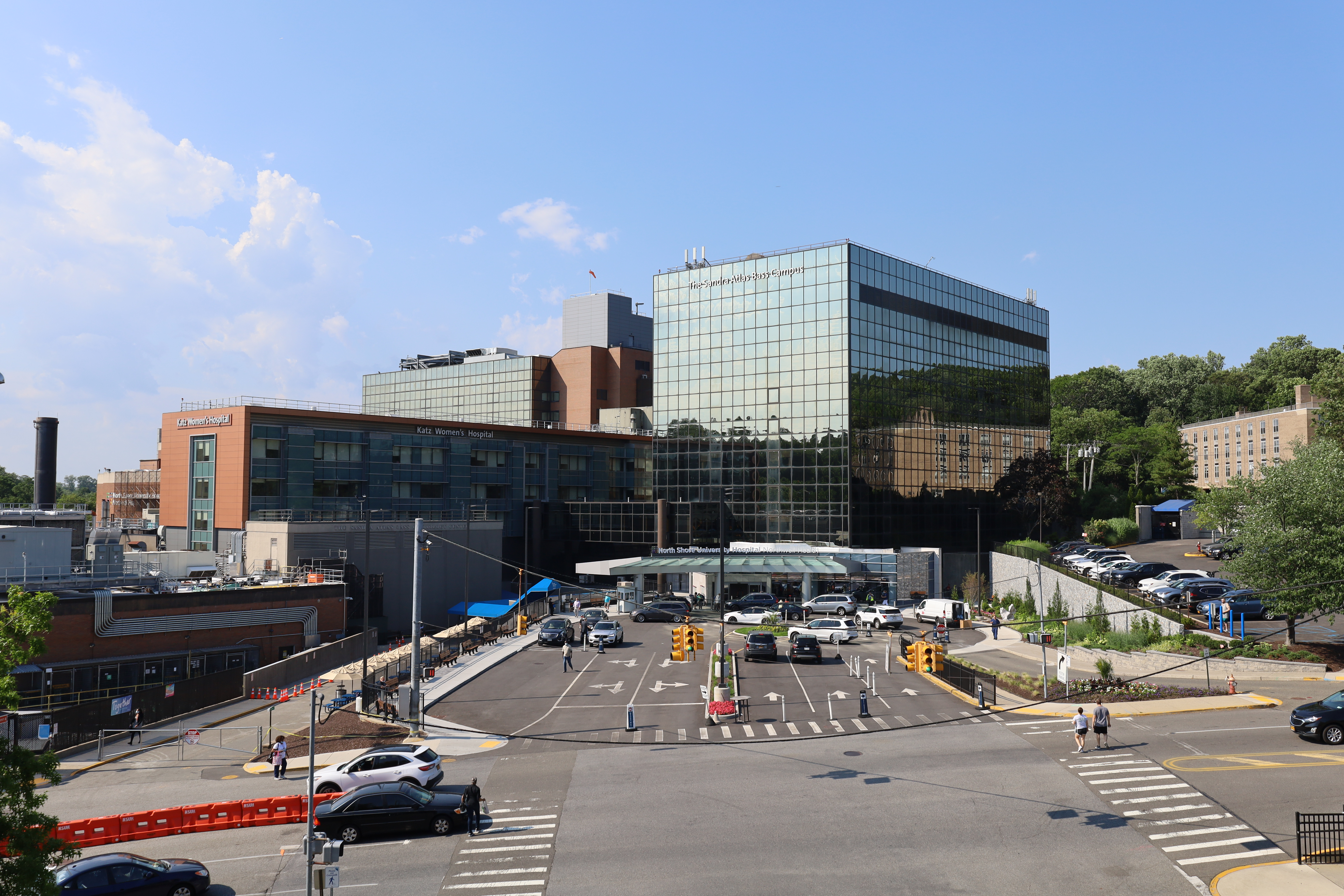
North Shore University Hospital in 2021

Manhasset is home to North Shore University Hospital, located on Community Drive. The hospital is operated by Northwell Health.

==== Fire ====
Manhasset, in its entirety, is located within the boundaries of (and is thus served by) the Manhasset–Lakeville Fire District.

==== Police ====
Manhasset, in its entirety, is served by the Nassau County Police Department's 6th Precinct, which is headquartered on Community Drive within the hamlet.

== Landmarks ==
Major landmarks in Manhasset include:

- Horatio Gates Onderdonk House
- Manhasset Monthly Meeting of the Society of Friends
- Shelter Rock
- Valley Road Historic District

== Notable people ==
- Danny Barnes (born 1989), Major League Baseball (MLB) pitcher.
- Bruce R. Bent, co-creator of the money market fund
- Bernie Bernthal (born 1960), soccer player.
- Ted Bessell (1935–96), television actor and director, That Girl.
- Billy Bitter (born 1988), professional lacrosse player
- Mike Breen (born 1961), NBA play-by-play commentator
- Jim Brown (born 1936), Hall of Fame football player and actor
- Craig Cohn (born 1983), professional wrestler better known as Craig Classic.
- Billy Crudup (born 1968), actor, in movies such as Big Fish and Almost Famous
- Jennifer S. DeSena – Attorney, civic leader, and politician serving as the 38th Town Supervisor of North Hempstead; lives in North Strathmore.
- R. A. Dickey (born 1974), former MLB pitcher for numerous teams, including Toronto Blue Jays and the New York Mets.
- Mike Dunlap (born 1957), former head coach of Charlotte Bobcats NBA team.
- Don Dunphy (1908–98), television and radio sports announcer specializing in boxing.
- Melissa Errico, former ingenue in Broadway musicals/performer; married to Patrick McEnroe.
- Boomer Esiason (born 1961), former professional football player, sports radio talk show host of WFAN's Boomer and Carton, television commentator.
- Jinx Falkenburg (1919–2003), model and radio personality with husband Tex McCrary.
- Peter T. Farrell (c. 1901–1992), judge who presided over the trial of bank robber Willie Sutton.
- Jason Foley (born 1995), professional baseball player
- Mike Francesa (born 1954), sports radio talk show host of WFAN's Mike's On: Francesa on the FAN.
- John A. Gambling (1930-2004), radio personality
- Ray Goulding (1922–90), radio personality, comedian, partner of Bob Elliott of "Bob and Ray" fame.
- J. Peter Grace (1913–95), former CEO of W.R. Grace and Company.
- Al Groh (born 1944), former head coach of New York Jets and the University of Virginia.
- Leroy Grumman (1895–1982), founder of Grumman Aircraft.

- Scotty Hill (1964), Guitarist and founder of the band Skid Row
- Ken Howard (1944–2016), actor, best known for the TV series The White Shadow.
- Chris Jericho (born 1970), AEW and WWE professional wrestler, lead vocalist of Fozzy.
- Alex Katz (born 1994), baseball pitcher
- Stephen A. Lesser (born 1944), architect, designer of Faneuil Hall Marketplace in Boston.
- Jackie MacMullan (born 1960), sportswriter.
- Jason Marquis (born 1978), major league baseball All Star pitcher.
- Leonard Marsh, co-founder of Snapple.
- Jim McCann, founder and CEO of 1-800-Flowers.
- Patrick McEnroe (born 1966), tennis player, U.S. Davis Cup captain, TV sportscaster
- J. R. Moehringer, Pulitzer Prize-winning author
- Chris Mullin (born 1963), Retired professional American basketball player
- George Nozuka, R&B/pop singer
- Bill O'Reilly (born 1949), television commentator and author
- Joan Whitney Payson (1903–75), heiress, businesswoman, philanthropist, patron of the arts and art collector, member of the prominent Whitney family; owner of the New York Mets.
- Norman F. Penny – Banker, insurance broker, and politician who had served in the New York State Assembly from 1938 to 1942; Penny was a major Republican figure in Nassau County. Lived in North Strathmore.
- Beulah Poynter (1883-1960), actress and writer, Manhasset resident
- Summer Rae (born 1983), professional wrestler, actress and former American football player
- José Reyes (born 1983), professional baseball player for the New York Mets
- Charles A. Riley ll, author and art museum director
- Anthony Scaramucci (born 1964), 10-day White House Communications Director and founder of SkyBridge Capital
- Elie Siegmeister (1909–91), composer, educator and author
- Lynn Strait (1968-1998), former lead vocalist and lyricist for the nu metal band Snot
- Arthur Treacher (1894–1975), actor
- John Hay "Jock" Whitney (1904–82), Venture Capitalist, Publisher, Ambassador
- Payne Whitney (1876–1927), Industrialist, Philanthropist

== In popular culture ==
Films

- Miracle on 34th Street (1947): In the film, Fred Gailey tells Mr. Kringle that he would like to buy a colonial home in Manhasset.
- "Love Ludlow" (2005) The Sundance hit was shot mostly in and around Manhasset. Myra and Ludlow's entire Queen's railroad apartment was a set built in the basement of Christ's Church in Manhasset.
- Boiler Room (2000): Portions of the driving scenes feature noticeable areas of Manhasset
- The Good Shepherd (2006): Portions of the movie were filmed in Manhasset.
- The Wolf of Wall Street (2013): Shots of the ZDC building can be seen in the film.
- This Is Where I Leave You (2014): Scenes filmed in Munsey Park at a house on the corner of Burnham Place and Park Avenue.

Television

- Saturday Night Live (1980): A short film called Manhasset was presented. It was a parody of Woody Allen's Manhattan, with sweeping shots of the Miracle Mile instead of the Manhattan skyline.
- Will & Grace: Karen states in one episode that she would like to use her helicopter to fly to Fortunoff's in Manhasset. However, in real life, there is no Fortunoff in Manhasset.
- Everybody Loves Raymond (1996): Uncle Gus owned Carpet World in Manhasset open 10-6 Sundays.
- Jim Brown: All-American (2002): Portions of the Spike Lee's HBO documentary were filmed in Manhasset.
- Made (2003): Scenes from MTV's TV series Made were filmed in Manhasset.
- The Good Wife (2009): Portions of this show were filmed in Manhasset.
- Revenge (2012): Emily Thorne visits a fictional "New Mercy Hospital" in Manhasset.
- The Blacklist (2013): Scenes filmed at Onderdonk Avenue and George Street, just off Plandome Road.

Literature

- The Great Gatsby (1925): The eastern shore of Manhasset Bay was F. Scott Fitzgerald's inspiration for "East Egg".
- The Caine Mutiny (1951): Protagonist Willie Keith's home is located in Manhasset.
- The Tender Bar (2005): Coming of age memoir by J.R. Moehringer that takes place in Manhasset. The bar featured in classic novel, The Tender Bar called Publicans, reopened in Manhasset on Plandome Road in 2017

Music

- The Manhansett Quartet was the first vocal group to record commercially under its own name, from about 1892.

International relations

- Manhasset negotiations (2007–2008): The Manhasset negotiations (also known as Manhasset I, II, III and IV) were a series of talks that took place in four rounds in 2007-2008 at Manhasset, New York between the Moroccan government and the representatives of the Saharawi liberation movement, the Polisario Front to resolve the Western Sahara conflict.
- Greentree Accord (2006): Otherwise known as the Bakassi Accord, it was an agreement between Nigeria and Cameroon on the issue of the Bakassi peninsula. Presidents Olusegun Obasanjo and Paul Biya signed what is now being called the Greentree Accord, in regard to the location of the meeting in Manhasset.

== See also ==
- Greentree
- Manhasset Hills
