= Saddle Rock Elementary School =

Coordinates: 40°47′34″N 73°44′46″W

- Great Neck, New York; USA

Information
- Type: Comprehensive school
- Established: 1950
- Principal: Ms. Luciana Bradley
- Assistant Principal: Ms. Sara Goldberg
- Website: School website

Saddle Rock Elementary School or simply "Saddle Rock" is an elementary school, comprising grades Kindergarten through 5. It is a public school located in Great Neck, New York, USA as part of the Great Neck School District. The school has been recognized by the Blue Ribbon Schools Program.

As of the 2007-08 school year, the elementary school had 73 Students in Kindergarten, 75 students in 1st grade, 80 students in 2nd grade, 97 students in 3rd grade, 83 students in 4th grade, 95 students in 5th grade and 31 ungraded students. The school had 47.4 classroom teachers (on an FTE basis), the school had a student-teacher ratio of 11.4 during the 2006-2007 academic year.

== Awards and recognition ==
During the 1993-94 school year, Saddle Rock Elementary School was recognized with the Blue Ribbon School Award of Excellence by the United States Department of Education.

Saddle Rock Elementary School was the subject of a November 17, 1952 Life Magazine photo essay.

== Information ==
- Address: 10 Hawthorne Lane Great Neck, New York 11023
- Year-round schedule: No
- Magnet school: No
- Charter school: No
- Coeducational: Yes
- School district: Great Neck Union Free School District
- Yearbook name:

== Notable alumnae ==
- Roxanne Seeman - American songwriter and lyricist.
