= Barbara Prey =

American painter (born 1957)

Barbara Ernst Prey
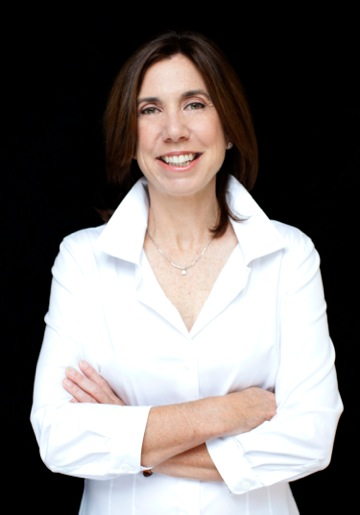
- Born: Barbara Elizabeth Ernst; 1957 (age 68–69); New York City, U.S.
- Education: Williams College (BA); Harvard University (MA)
- Known for: Painting
- Awards: Fulbright Scholarship, 1979; Henry Luce Grant, 1986; New York State Women of Distinction Award, 2004

Barbara Ernst Prey (born 1957) is an American artist who specializes in the art of watercolor. In 2008 Prey was appointed to the National Council on the Arts, the advisory body of the National Endowment for the Arts. In 2015, MASS MoCA commissioned Barbara Prey to create the world's largest known watercolor painting (8 by 15 feet) for its new Building 6, which opened in Spring 2017. She has worked in oil painting and illustration, the latter of which she contributed to The New Yorker for a decade. She currently works and lives in Long Island, New York, Maine and Williamstown, Massachusetts.

== Early life and education ==
Barbara Ernst Prey was born in New York City in 1957. Her mother Peggy Ernst was an artist and Head of the Design Department at New York City's Pratt Art Institute. Prey cites her mother as one of her greatest influences and inspirations. At 16 she was awarded a summer scholarship to the San Francisco Art Institute. She was 17 when Governor Hugh Carey purchased one of her early oil paintings.

Prey received her B.A. in Art History with Honors from Williams College in 1979 where she was mentored by Lane Faison and a master's degree from Harvard University in 1986. A 2007 article in USA Today stated that "Prey's academic studies at Williams College with the art historian Lane Faisson, and at Harvard University provide the connection between art and art history that so strongly informs her work." After an internship at The Metropolitan Museum in New York City, she was awarded a Fulbright Scholarship, enabling her to spend two years in southern Germany where she studied, worked and exhibited extensively. She then worked for a year as a personal assistant-court painter to Prince Albrecht Castell-Castell. A grant from The Henry Luce Foundation from 1986 to 1987 to Tainan, Taiwan, where she was a visiting professor in Western art, enabled her to continue to study with several Chinese master painters. She continued to exhibit in Asia where she painted her first large, full-sheet paintings.

== Career ==
=== Early work ===
Returning to New York in 1981 from her studies and exhibits in Europe, Prey lived in New York City where she worked in the Modern Painting Department at Sothebys. It was also at this time that she began to focus intently on drawing, and to sell her work to publications such as The New Yorker, which bought and reproduced her illustrations for over ten years. Magazines such as Gourmet, Good Housekeeping, Horticulture, as well as The New York Times followed suit, granting wide exposure.

During this time, Prey continued work on her watercolors. She began selling her work to family and friends, then made sales through private exhibitions and social gatherings, eventually retaining representation with numerous galleries.

=== Exhibitions ===
Prey's work has been featured in many national and international exhibits. For the past three years, her work has been featured in the Smithsonian Traveling Exhibit: NASA Art: 50 Years of Exploration; and selected pieces can be found on exhibit at the National Air and Space Museum in Washington, DC and at the Kennedy Space Center. In 2008 the Mona Bismarck Foundation in Paris, France presented the retrospective An American View: Barbara Ernst Prey. Preys painting "Parade Route" was chosen to be exhibited at the U.S. Embassy Hong Kong in 2015.

=== Commissions and awards ===
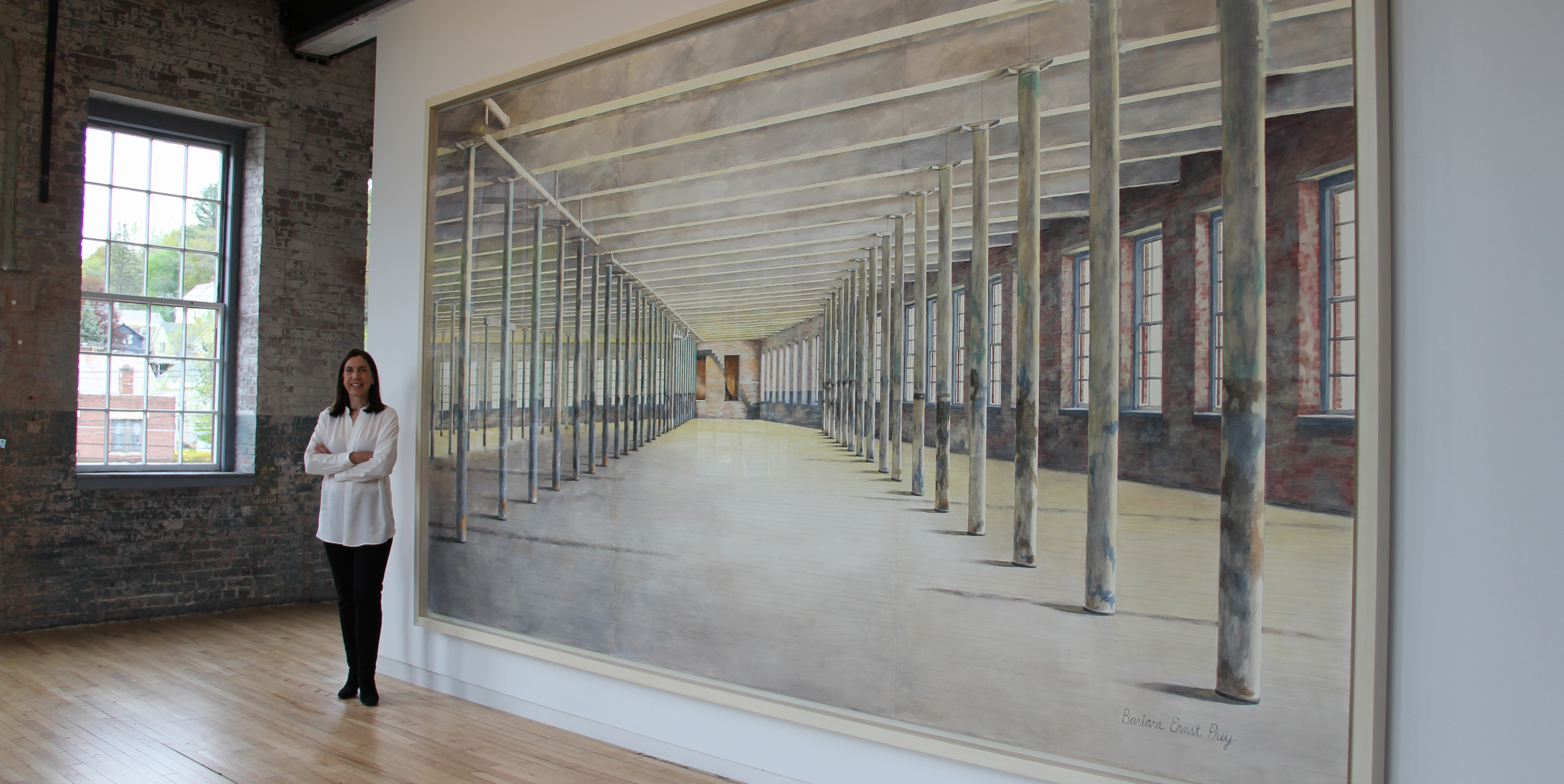
Barbara Prey on front of her 8 x 15 feet painting at MASS MoCA

Prey was commissioned by NASA to paint four paintings for their collection. She has painted the x-43, the world's fastest aircraft; a commemorative work for the anniversary of the Space Shuttle Columbia tragedy titled "The Columbia Tribute; a rendition of the International Space Station"; and a painting of the Space Shuttle Discovery titled "Shuttle Discovery: Return to Flight". In 2003, Prey was commissioned by the President and First Lady to paint the official White House Christmas Card. Prey's painting is included in the White House permanent collection. In 2004 the New York State Senate honored Prey with the Senate's "Women of Distinction Award". Prey was also honored by the Heckscher Museum of Art at their 2011 Celebrate Achievement Gala for her achievements and contribution to American art and culture. Heckscher Museum Director Michael Schantz stated, "Barbara is one of America's most gifted watercolorists whose works are rooted in the grand traditions of American landscape painting." In 2008, Prey was appointed by the President and approved by the Senate to the National Council of the Arts, which advises the National Endowment for the Arts. Chairman Dana Gioia stated to ARTFORUM "Barbara Prey's nomination continues our tradition of having prominent visual artists as members of the National Council of the Arts." She has lectured at the National Gallery of Art, Corcoran Gallery of Art, Dartmouth College, The Metropolitan Museum of Art and the Thyssen Bornemisza Museum Madrid. In 2015 Prey's painting The Collection was selected by the U.S. State Department as the July 4th image for every U.S. Ambassador and Embassy invitation around the world for their Embassy celebrations. Prey has been commissioned by Massachusetts Museum of Contemporary Art (MASS MoCA) to paint a monumental watercolor for their new Building 6. Prey's 8 x 15 feet interior portrait "MASS MoCA Building 6" is said to be the world's largest watercolor.

== Work and reception ==
Prey is both an oil and water color painter but her primary medium is watercolor. She has said, "watercolor is a lot like jazz you kind of know where you're going, but you're going off along the way." She has expressed an interest in the use of strong color, especially applied to her study of Maine landscapes; "A clear blue sky speaks to your soul — it's like a piece of music." Referring to her White House Christmas card in 2003, an article in The New Yorker stated that "Barbara Prey, may be, at this moment, the most widely viewed painter in the world." David Mitten, curator of the Harvard Art Museums, described Prey's paintings as, "Partaking of the universal values of light and color, while creating coherent evocative spaces of great beauty and enduring significance." In 2015 Prey was appointed to the board of the Art Museums of Colonial Williamsburg."

Sarah Cash of the National Gallery of Art has said that Prey's works "connects us, as viewers, to the land (and the sea); these scenes link us to place, history, and elemental human pursuits in the face of our frenetic, technology-dominated lives. The pristine landscapes and seascapes… suggest the power and permanence of nature in contrast to the relative transience of human life. Our imaginations are not only enticed by the houses, boats and sheds themselves, but also by the exquisitely wrought details that animate the compositions." The idea of American identity plays a large role in Prey's work both in subject matter and context. An article in The Wall Street Journal stated, "Drawing from the tradition of renowned American artists such as Winslow Homer and Edward Hopper, contemporary artist Barbara Ernst Prey's watercolors evoke symbols of the US"

== Collections ==
MASS MoCA, The Brooklyn Museum, The National Gallery of Art, Washington, D.C., The White House, The Smithsonian American Art Museum, Kennedy Space Center, Williams College, Williams College Museum of Art, Hood Museum, Dartmouth College, The New-York Historical Society Museum, The George W. Bush Presidential Library and Center, The Farnsworth Art Museum, The Taiwan Museum of Art, Mellon Hall, Harvard Business School, The Henry Luce Foundation, Reader's Digest Corporation and NASA Headquarters.

== Bibliography ==
- An American View: Barbara Ernst Prey, essay by National Gallery of Art Curator Sarah Cash
- NASA|Art: 50 Years Harry Abrams, 2008
- Bush, Laura. Spoken from The Heart. May 2010: pg.298
- Rooney, Ashley E. 100 Artists of New England. February 2011: pg.58-59
- Seasons Greetings from the White House: The Collection of Presidential Christmas Cards, Messages and Gifts by Mary Evans Seeley, 2005
- Barbara Ernst Prey: Works on Water, essay by National Gallery of Art Curator Sarah Cash
- Art in Embassies Program, U.S Embassy Paris, The Ties that Bind. Les Liens qui nous unissent, Published by the ART in Embassies Program U.S Department of State, Washington D.C. May 2006
- United States Embassy Minsk, Published by the ART in Embassies Program U.S Department of State, Washington D.C. July 2004
- The Art In Embassies Program, Exhibition at the Resident of the U.S Ambassador in Prague, Published by the ART in Embassies Program U.S Department of State, Washington D.C. July 2004
- ART in Embassies Program, United States Embassy Madrid. Published by the ART in Embassies Program U.S Department of State, Washington D.C. April 2006
- Art in Embassies Program, Art at The Residence of the Ambassador of the United States of America to the Kingdom of Norway. Published by the ART in Embassies Program U.S Department of State, Washington D.C. July 2003
- Art in Embassies Program, Consulate General of the United States, Hong Kong and Macau. Published by Art in Embassies, U.S Department of State, Washington, D.C. December 2014
