= Great Neck Public Schools =

Public school district of Great Neck, New York, US

Great Neck Union Free School District

Address
- 345 Lakeville Road Great Neck, New York, 11020; United States

District information
- Motto: “Where Discovery Leads to Greatness”
- Grades: PreK-12
- Established: 1814
- Superintendent: Dr. Kenneth R. Bossert
- School board: Great Neck Public Schools Board of Education
- Budget: $234,418,944
- NCES District ID: 3612510

Other information

Great Neck Public Schools is a public school district serving students residing in specific areas of Great Neck, North New Hyde Park, North Hills, and Manhasset Hills, New York. It is Union Free School District Number 7 in the Town of North Hempstead in Nassau County, Long Island, New York, United States.

About 6,846 students according to Niche rankings, grades K-12, attend the Great Neck Public Schools. On May 21, 2019, the voters of this district passed a budget of $234,418,944.

As of the 2015-16 school year, the district's ten schools had a total enrollment of 6,399 students and 585.0 classroom teachers (on an FTE basis), for a student-teacher ratio of 10.7.

== List of schools ==
=== Current schools ===
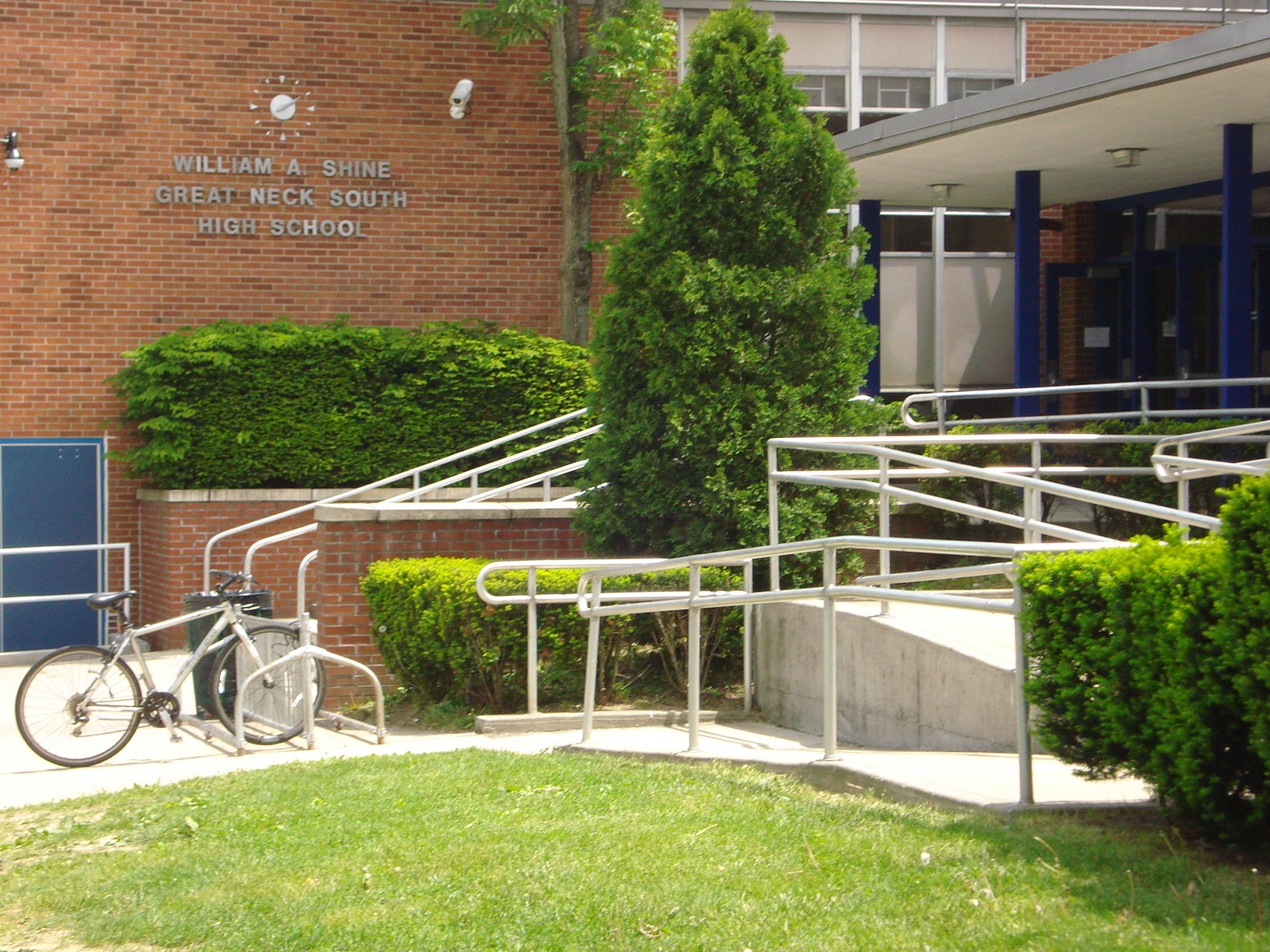
Great Neck South High School, 2009

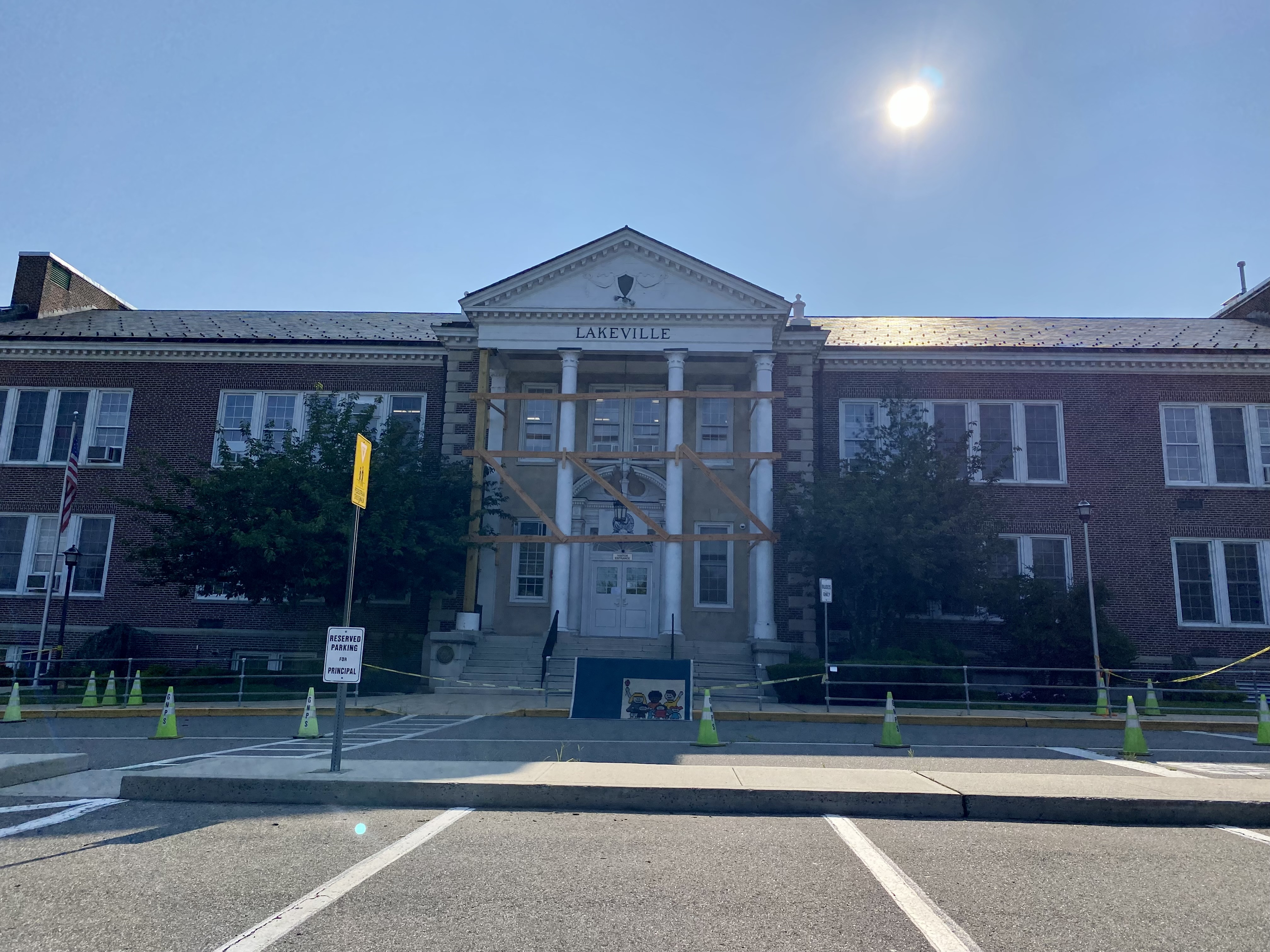
Lakeville Elementary School, July 2021

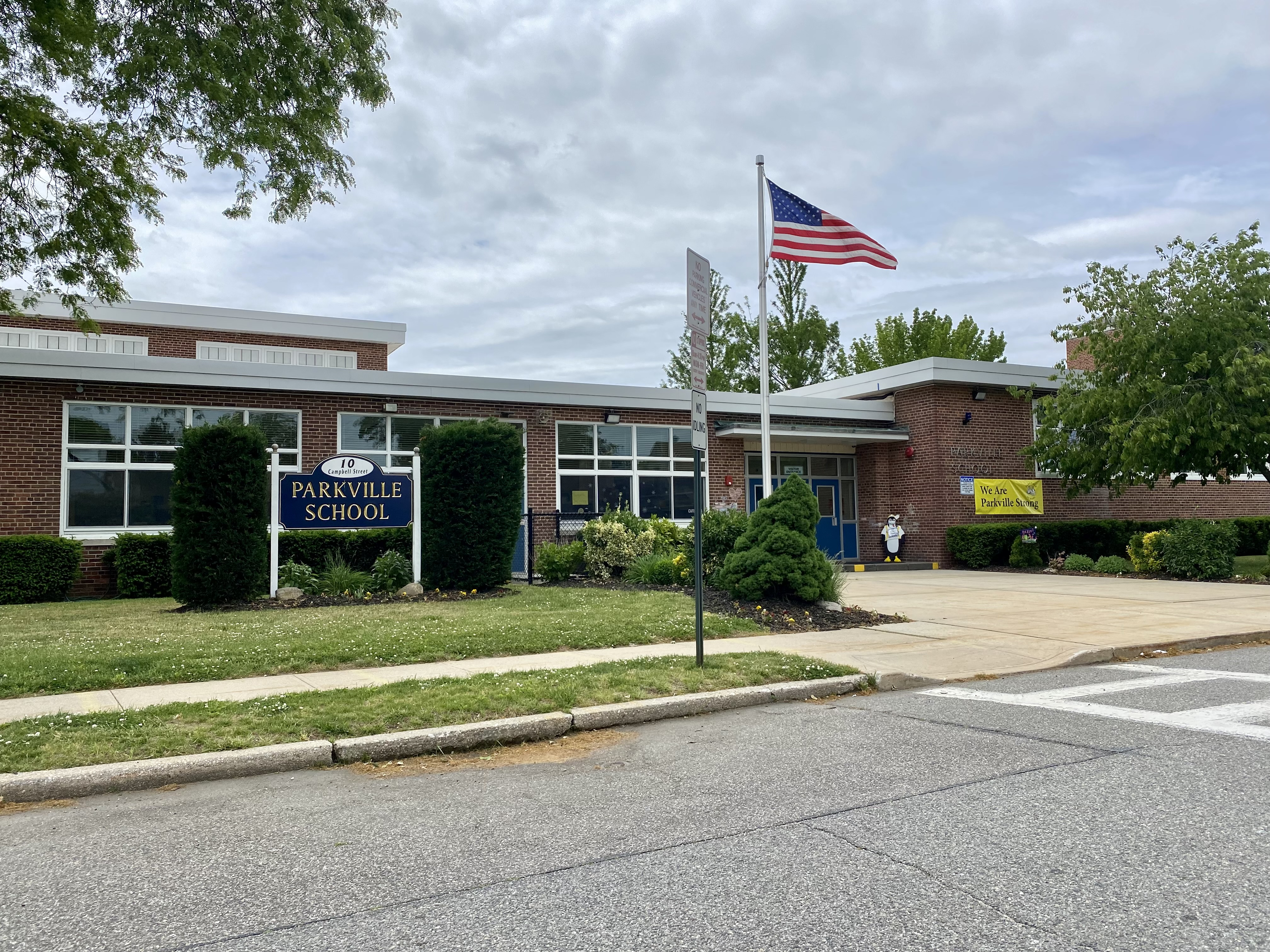
Parkville School, May 2021

There are three high schools: North High School, with an alternative program, Community School; South High School; and The Village School, a small alternative high school. There are also two middle schools, four elementary schools, and a nursery school.

- High schools:
  - Great Neck North High School
  - Great Neck South High School
  - Great Neck Village High School (Alternative school)
- Middle schools:
  - Great Neck North Middle School
  - Great Neck South Middle School
- Elementary schools:
  - Elizabeth Mellick Baker Elementary School (also known as E. M. Baker)
  - John F. Kennedy Elementary School
  - Lakeville Elementary School
  - Saddle Rock Elementary School
- Nursery school
  - Parkville School

=== Former schools ===
Declining student population through the 1970s and 1980s resulted in a reduction in the number of operating elementary schools from eleven in 1954 to only four as of 2021. The previously operational schools included:

==== Early schools ====
School name	Opened	Closed	Notes
Woolley's Brook School	1814	1830	
Second School (name unknown)	1830	1838	Burned down
Fairview Avenue School	1840	1869	(photo)(another photo)
First Arrandale School	1869	1899	(photo)
Second Arrandale School	1900	1920 (burned down)	(photo)
"Second" School (Kensington)	1905		(photo)(another photo)

==== Modern day schools ====
School name	Opened	Closed	Notes
Arrandale School	1914	1977	Building on corner of Arrandale Ave. and Middle Neck Rd.; demolished in 1976
Kensington-Johnson School	1921	1981	Demolished 1996
Cumberland School	1951	1981	Became Cumberland Adult Center
Cutter Mill School	1952	1978	Demolished
Clover Drive School	1954		Became Clover Drive Adult Center
Grace Avenue School	1954		Became Great Neck Senior Center
Cherry Lane School	1954	1976	Sold to private religious school

== Academic performance ==
Based on the 2020 Niche rankings, the Great Neck Union Free School District is the number one public school district in New York and number three in the United States, beating out its rivals — Jericho and Manhasset Union Free School District. In 2017, 75% of all students in this district were proficient in the English Language Arts while 78% of all students in this district are considered proficient in Mathematics.

== See also ==
- List of school districts in New York
