= Strathmore, New York =

- Hamlet
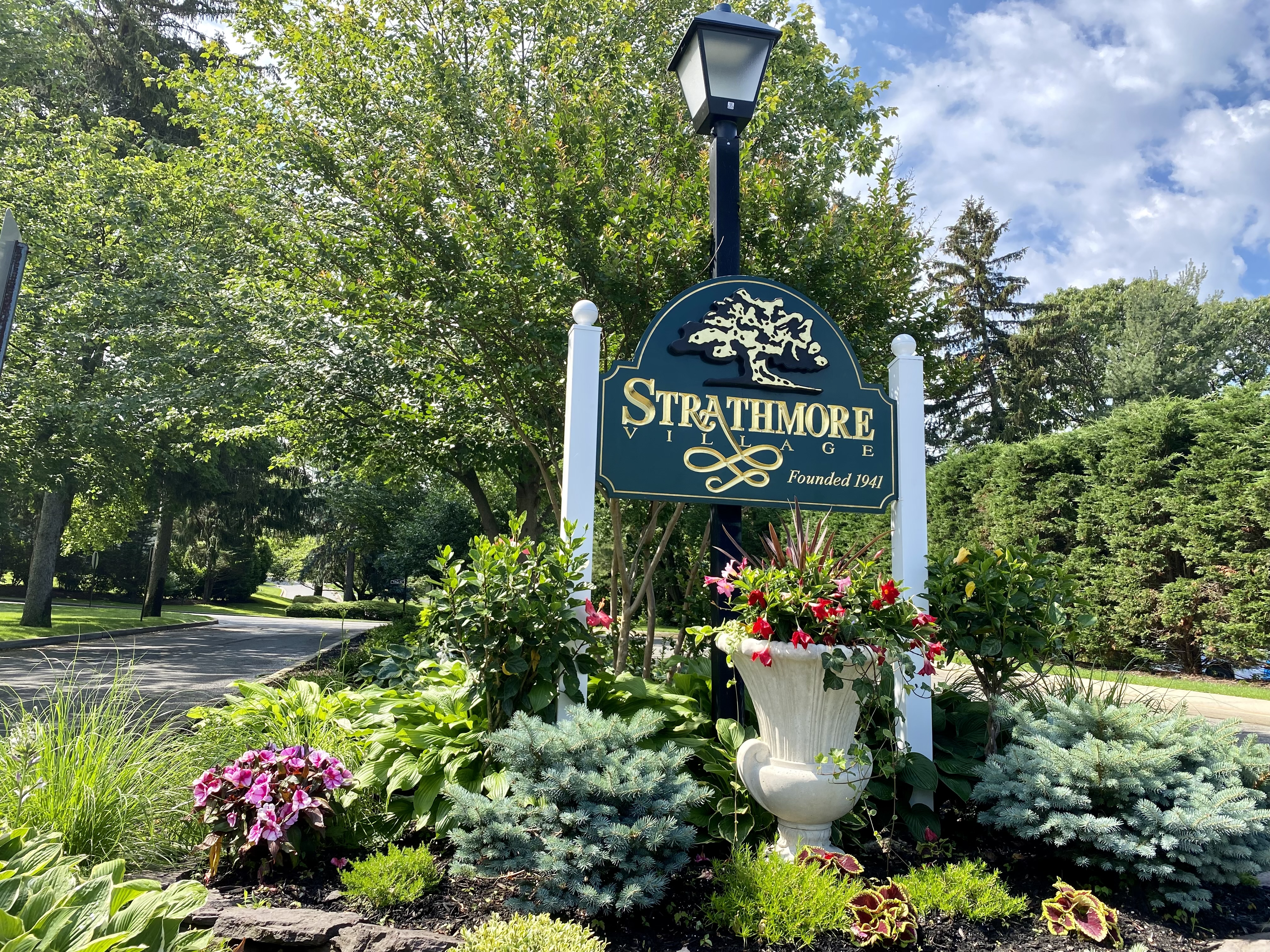
- An entrance to the Strathmore Village portion of the hamlet on June 15, 2021
- Nickname: The Strathmores
- Location on Long Island Location within the state of New York
- Coordinates: 40°47′31″N 73°40′38″W
- Country: United States
- State: New York
- County: Nassau
- Town: North Hempstead
- Originally developed: 1930s – 1940s
- Founder: Levitt & Sons
- Neighborhoods: 4

Area
  - Total: 0.61 sq mi (1.6 km^{2})
  - Land: 0.61 sq mi (1.6 km^{2})
  - Water: 0.00 sq mi (0 km^{2})
- Elevation: 213 ft (65 m)
- Demonym(s): Manhassetonian; Strathmoreite
- Time zone: UTC−5 (Eastern (EST))
  - Summer (DST): UTC−4 (EDT)
- Zip Code: 11030
- Area codes: 516, 363
- GNIS feature ID: 966623

An interactive map of Strathmore and its four sections.

Strathmore is an unincorporated, Levitt & Sons-developed hamlet in the Town of North Hempstead in Nassau County, on the North Shore of Long Island, in New York, United States, within the census-designated place (CDP) of Manhasset.

Although presently considered part of the Manhasset CDP, Strathmore remains distinct from the other areas of the CDP, and the hamlet's name continues to be widely-used and accepted both socially and politically.

The hamlet, which consists of four large, Levitt-developed housing developments, is also often referred to as The Strathmores.

The southern parts of Strathmore once attempted to incorporate as a village – but the proposal was voted down in a referendum on the matter. Because of the outcome of the referendum, all of Strathmore remains part of the unincorporated Manhasset CDP to this day.

== History ==
=== The southern Strathmores (South, Vanderbilt, and Village) ===
Much of what is now the southern part of Strathmore was once part of the estate of Frank A. Munsey. Following his death, the land was given to the Metropolitan Museum of Art, per his will. The Metropolitan Museum of Art ultimately developed some of the land as Munsey Park and sold the area south of Northern Boulevard (NY 25A) to the Vanderbilt family, and the land remained in Vanderbilt family ownership for roughly a decade; their mansion, which had previously been owned by Louis Sherry, is now the Strathmore–Vanderbilt Country Club. The residents in the Strathmore–Vanderbilt subdivision have deeded memberships to the country club.

Other portions of Strathmore south of Northern Boulevard – including much of what is now the Americana Manhasset and the Strathmore Village section of the hamlet – was developed over the estates of Robert G. Elbert and Genevieve Macaulay.

In February 1944, a massive fire broke out in the shopping area of Strathmore Village. The fire severely damaged 15 shops, along with the Levitt & Sons real estate office which was built only 2 years prior. The cost of the damage was estimated to be roughly $250,000 (1944 USD).

In the 1990s, residents in Strathmore grew concerned over the fate of the former Manhasset Club (which was originally known as the Village Bath Club). More than 1,000 residents petitioned for the club to be purchased by the Manhasset Park District to keep it operating as a public park. After that failed, residents attempted to have the Town of North Hempstead landmark the club's main building, which was designed to resemble a California hunting lodge designed by Frank Lloyd Wright. The North Hempstead Landmarks Commission ultimately denied their requests, claiming that the building was not a landmark. Ultimately, the building – along with the rest of the 2.5-acre (1.0 ha) property – was soon demolished and replaced with new homes.

==== Failed incorporation attempt ====
Between 1949 and 1950, the residents in the southern portions of Strathmore proposed incorporating their three sections – South Strathmore, Strathmore–Vanderbilt, and Strathmore Village – as a single village, which would have been known as the "Incorporated Village of Strathmore." These plans were unsuccessful, as voters rejected the plan 742-to-248 during the referendum vote.

Under standard protocol in New York, more than half of the voters would have had to approve of the plan in order for Strathmore to be incorporated.

==== Northern Boulevard Bypass controversy, 1956 ====
In the 1950s, the New York State Department of Public Works proposed constructing a Manhasset Bypass (also known as the Miracle Mile Bypass) from East Shore Road to Manhasset Woods Road, crossing Whitney Pond and Shelter Rock Road, and its easternmost portions would have sliced diagonally through the southwestern part of South Strathmore. The bypass would have carried New York State Route 25A, shifting its alignment slightly south of its current one.

The proposal would have created a four-lane or six-lane bypass of the western half of the Miracle Mile, and would have cost roughly $5,000,000 to $8,000,000 (1956 USD). Approximately ten homes in South Strathmore would have been acquired through eminent domain – in addition to the taking of portions of property from two churches as well as from the Munsey Park Elementary School in neighboring Munsey Park. It also would have severed one of the South Strathmore subdivision's major entrances/exits.

The impacts which the highway would have had on the community and the surrounding areas caused many Strathmore residents to protest its construction, and the proposal was ultimately scrapped by politicians in Albany.

=== North Strathmore ===
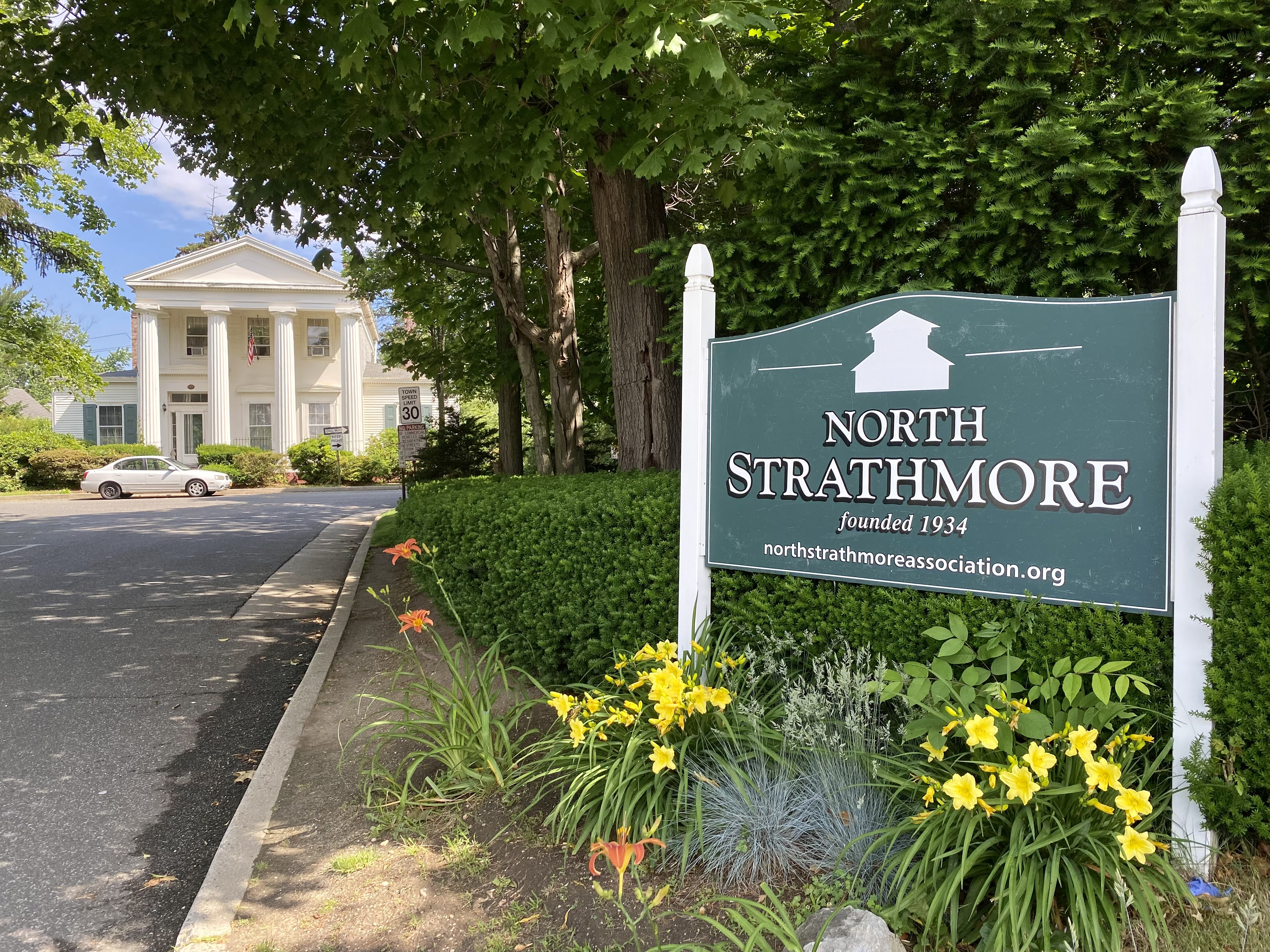
An entrance to North Strathmore, with the Onderdonk House in the background

The area which is now North Strathmore was formerly owned by Horatio Gates Onderdonk, who was of the prominent Long Island family of the same name. It was sold to Levitt & Sons in 1933; the firm soon would begin developing the area.

In the late 1940s, there was a controversial, failed proposal to build a 3-acre (1.2 ha) park in the North Strathmore area. It was argued by many Manhasset residents that all of Greater Manhasset would be paying for a park which only North Strathmore residents would be able to use. The $45,000 (1949 USD) bond referendum was ultimately voted down, and subsequently the Manhasset Park District never built the park.

The historic Horatio Gates Onderdonk House, which was turned into the neighborhood's centerpiece by Levitt & Sons, underwent an extensive rehabilitation in the 1980s.

== Geography ==
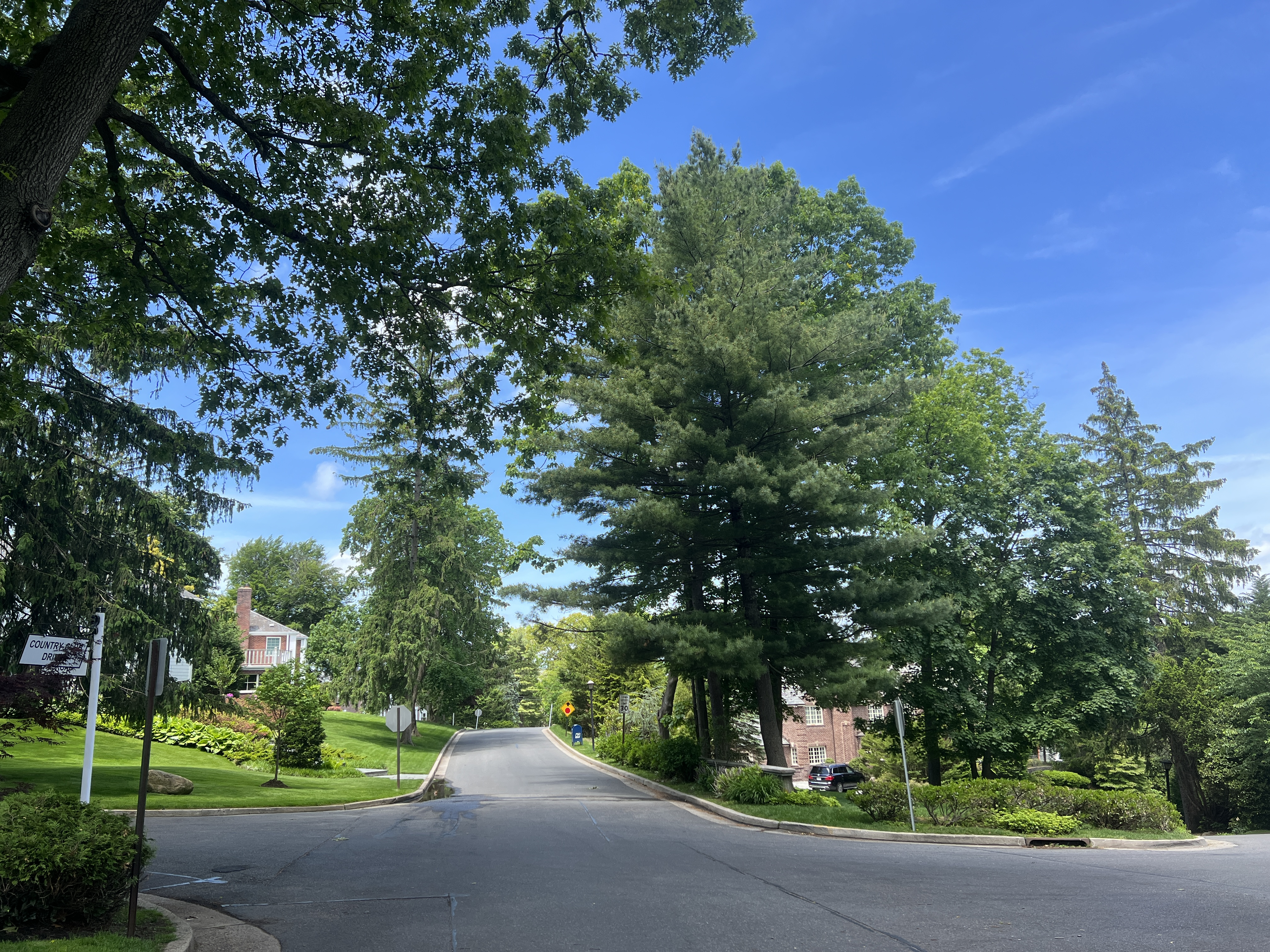
Country Club Drive at Mill Spring Road in the Strathmore–Vanderbilt section of the hamlet on May 26, 2022

Strathmore has a total area of roughly 0.6 square miles (1.6 km^{2}), all land.

Strathmore consists of four well-defined residential neighborhoods: North Strathmore, South Strathmore, Strathmore–Vanderbilt, and Strathmore Village. The southern portions of the hamlet form the Manhasset CDP's long, eastern panhandle, which extends as far east as Searingtown Road (CR 101), at the border with Roslyn Estates. North Strathmore, meanwhile, is located at the very base of the Cow Neck Peninsula, and is north of Northern Boulevard (NY 25A).

The entire hamlet is within the Manhasset CDP, and it is part of the Greater Manhasset area.

=== Topography ===
Like the rest of Long Island's North Shore, Strathmore is situated on a terminal moraine, which is named the Harbor Hill Moraine. This moraine was formed by glaciers during the Wisconsin Glacial Episode, and is named for Harbor Hill in Roslyn; Harbor Hill is the highest geographic point in Nassau County.

=== Drainage ===
Strathmore, in its entirety, is located within the Manhasset Bay Watershed – along with the larger Long Island Sound/Atlantic Ocean Watershed.

=== Climate ===
Strathmore – like the rest of Manhasset – features a humid subtropical climate (Cfa) under the Köppen climate classification and is located near the transitional zone between humid subtropical and humid continental (Dfa) climates. Accordingly, the hamlet experiences hot, humid summers and cold winters, and experiences precipitation throughout the entirety of the year.

Climate data for Manhasset CDP, New York
| Month | Jan | Feb | Mar | Apr | May | Jun | Jul | Aug | Sep | Oct | Nov | Dec | Year |
|---|---|---|---|---|---|---|---|---|---|---|---|---|---|
| Record high °F (°C) | 71 (22) | 73 (23) | 87 (31) | 94 (34) | 96 (36) | 101 (38) | 108 (42) | 105 (41) | 97 (36) | 89 (32) | 83 (28) | 76 (24) | 108 (42) |
| Mean daily maximum °F (°C) | 40.4 (4.7) | 42.9 (6.1) | 51.1 (10.6) | 61.2 (16.2) | 70.6 (21.4) | 79.6 (26.4) | 84.5 (29.2) | 83.3 (28.5) | 76.0 (24.4) | 65.4 (18.6) | 55.7 (13.2) | 45.1 (7.3) | 63.0 (17.2) |
| Daily mean °F (°C) | 33.4 (0.8) | 35.0 (1.7) | 42.0 (5.6) | 51.8 (11.0) | 60.8 (16.0) | 70.1 (21.2) | 75.2 (24.0) | 74.1 (23.4) | 67.2 (19.6) | 56.5 (13.6) | 47.8 (8.8) | 38.2 (3.4) | 54.3 (12.4) |
| Mean daily minimum °F (°C) | 26.4 (−3.1) | 27.1 (−2.7) | 33.5 (0.8) | 42.4 (5.8) | 51.0 (10.6) | 60.6 (15.9) | 65.8 (18.8) | 65.0 (18.3) | 58.3 (14.6) | 47.6 (8.7) | 39.9 (4.4) | 31.2 (−0.4) | 45.7 (7.6) |
| Record low °F (°C) | −4 (−20) | −5 (−21) | 5 (−15) | 13 (−11) | 34 (1) | 43 (6) | 50 (10) | 46 (8) | 38 (3) | 27 (−3) | 18 (−8) | −2 (−19) | −5 (−21) |
| Average precipitation inches (mm) | 3.56 (90) | 2.87 (73) | 4.47 (114) | 3.85 (98) | 3.23 (82) | 3.54 (90) | 3.97 (101) | 4.26 (108) | 4.31 (109) | 4.08 (104) | 3.18 (81) | 3.99 (101) | 45.31 (1,151) |
| Average snowfall inches (cm) | 5.5 (14) | 7.8 (20) | 3.7 (9.4) | 0.3 (0.76) | 0 (0) | 0 (0) | 0 (0) | 0 (0) | 0 (0) | 0 (0) | 0.2 (0.51) | 5.7 (14) | 23.2 (58.67) |
| Average relative humidity (%) | 73 | 75 | 72 | 72 | 75 | 74 | 73 | 71 | 73 | 73 | 71 | 75 | 73 |
| Mean monthly sunshine hours | 177 | 153 | 172 | 167 | 202 | 213 | 237 | 241 | 215 | 190 | 210 | 171 | 2,348 |
| Average ultraviolet index | 2 | 2 | 2 | 3 | 5 | 6 | 6 | 6 | 5 | 3 | 2 | 2 | 4 |
Source: NOAA; Weather Atlas; The Weather Channel

==== Plant zone ====
According to the United States Department of Agriculture (USDA), Strathmore is located within hardiness zone 7b.

== Government ==
=== Town representation ===
As an unincorporated area within North Hempstead, Strathmore is governed directly by the Town of North Hempstead, which is seated in Manhasset. Strathmore is located within North Hempstead's 5th Council District, which as of June 2026 is represented on the North Hempstead Town Council by Yaron Levy (R–Harbor Hills).

=== Representation in higher government ===
On the county level, Strathmore is located within the Nassau County Legislature's 10th Legislative district, which as of June 2026 is represented by Mazi Melesa Pilip (R–Great Neck).

On the state level, Strathmore is located entirely within New York's 16th State Assembly district and New York's 7th State Senate district, which as of June 2026 are represented by Daniel J. Norber (R–Great Neck) and Jack M. Martins (R–Old Westbury), respectively.

On the federal level, Strathmore is located entirely within New York's 3rd Congressional district, which as of June 2026 is represented in the United States House of Representatives by Thomas R. Suozzi (D–Glen Cove). Like with the rest of New York, it is represented in the United States Senate by Kirsten E. Gillibrand (D) and Charles E. Schumer (D).

=== Politics ===
In the 2024 U.S. presidential election, the majority of Strathmore voters voted for Donald J. Trump (R).

== Education ==
=== School district ===
Strathmore in its entirety is served by the Manhasset Union Free School District. Elementary school students in grades K–6 either attend Munsey Park Elementary School or Shelter Rock Elementary School, depending on where they live within the hamlet. All students attend the Manhasset Secondary School for grades 7–12.

=== Library district ===
Strathmore is located entirely within the boundaries of the Manhasset Library District, which is served by the Manhasset Public Library.

== Infrastructure ==
=== Transportation ===
==== Roads ====
Northern Boulevard (New York State Route 25A) passes through and serves Strathmore and forms portions of its northern border with Munsey Park.

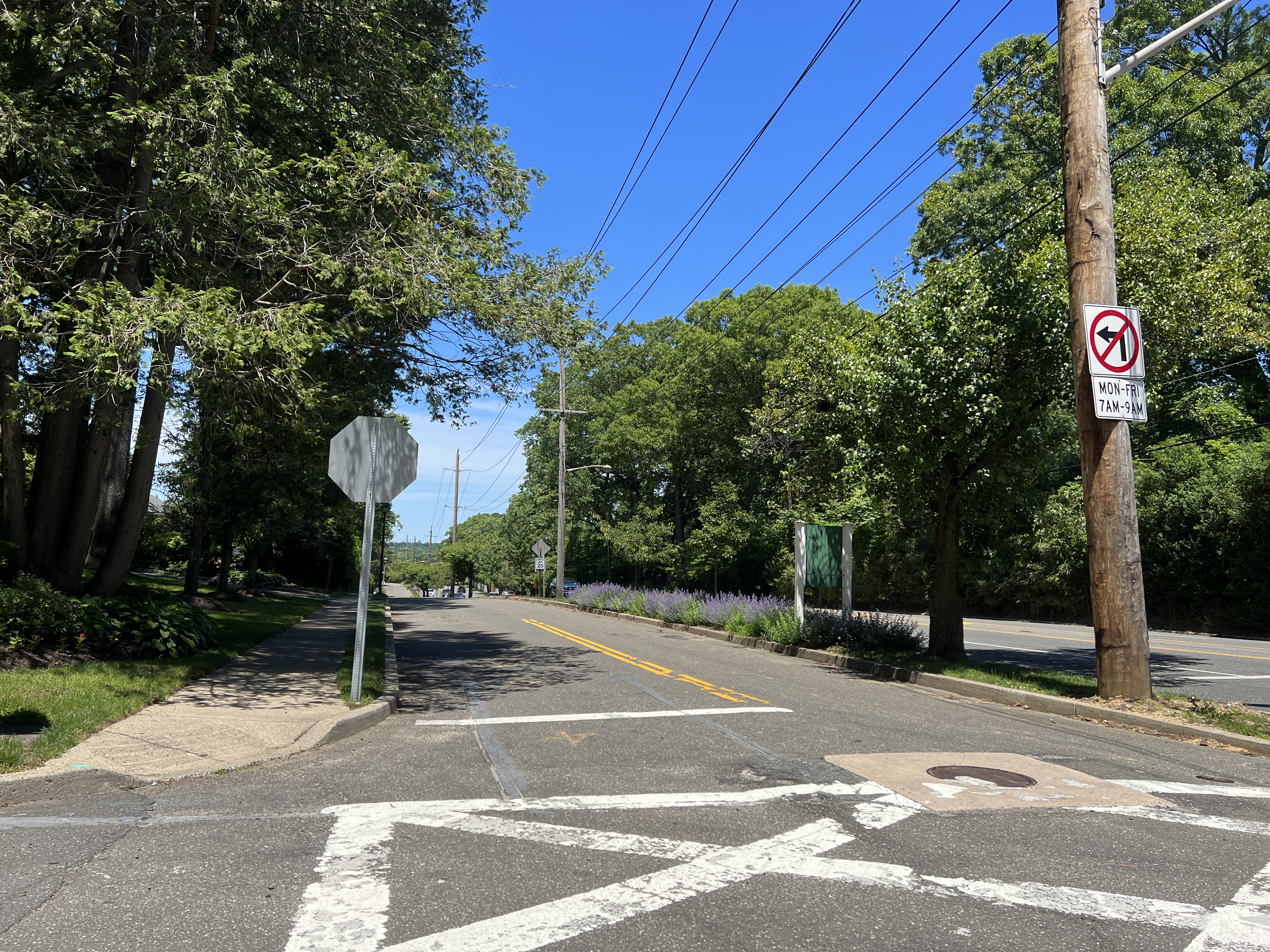
Searingtown Road's old (foreground) and new (far-right) alignments within Strathmore in 2022, looking north

Other major streets and roads which are either partially or wholly within the hamlet include Andrew Road, Country Club Drive, East Gate, Harrow Lane, Pickwick Road, Searingtown Road (Nassau County Route 101), Strathmore Road, The Gate, and Village Road.

==== Rail ====
No rail lines pass through Strathmore. The nearest Long Island Rail Road station to the hamlet is Manhasset on the Port Washington Branch.

==== Bus ====
Strathmore is served by the n20H, n20X, and n21 bus routes, which are operated by Nassau Inter-County Express (NICE). These three bus routes travel through the area via Northern Boulevard.

=== Utilities ===
==== Natural gas ====
National Grid USA provides natural gas to properties within Strathmore that are hooked up to natural gas lines.

==== Power ====
PSEG Long Island provides power to all homes and businesses within Strathmore, on behalf of the Long Island Power Authority.

==== Sewage ====
Strathmore is primarily unsewered, although some portions of the hamlet zoned for business & commercial uses – such as the Americana Manhasset – are connected to the Great Neck Water Pollution Control District's sanitary sewers via a sewer main underneath Northern Boulevard.

All unsewered areas of the hamlet rely on cesspools and septic systems, as opposed to sanitary sewers.

==== Water ====
Strathmore is located within the boundaries of the Manhasset–Lakeville Water District, which provides the entirety of the hamlet with water.

=== Emergency services ===
==== Fire ====
Strathmore, in its entirety, is located within the boundaries of (and is thus served by) the Manhasset–Lakeville Fire District.

==== Police ====
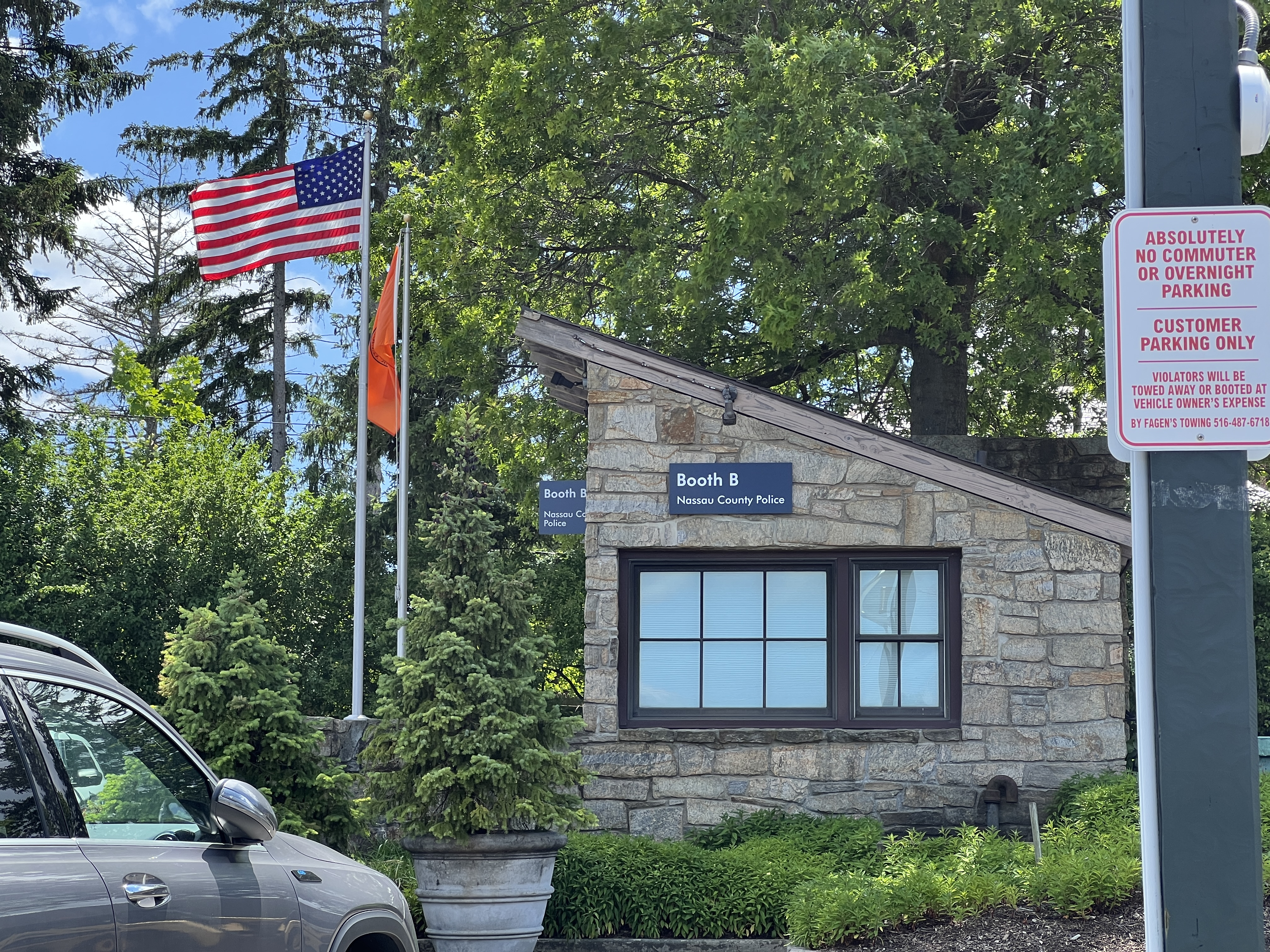
A Nassau County Police Department booth at the Americana Manhasset in Strathmore in 2023

Strathmore, in its entirety, is served by the Nassau County Police Department's Sixth Precinct, which has a police booth within the hamlet, at the Americana Manhasset.

== Landmarks ==
- Horatio Gates Onderdonk House – a historic home formerly owned by Horatio Gates Onderdonk; it is listed on the National Register of Historic Places and is the centerpiece of the North Strathmore section of the hamlet.

== Notable people ==
- Jennifer S. DeSena – Attorney, civic leader, and politician serving as the 38th Town Supervisor of North Hempstead; lives in North Strathmore.
- Michael Hawkins – Actor.
- Norman F. Penny – Banker, broker, and politician who served in the New York State Assembly from 1938 to 1942; major Republican figure in Nassau County. Lived on Rocky Wood Road in North Strathmore.

== See also ==
- List of Levitt & Sons housing developments on Long Island
- Locust Grove, New York
