= Veterans of Foreign Wars Memorial Park =

Park and memorial in Manhasset, New York, United States

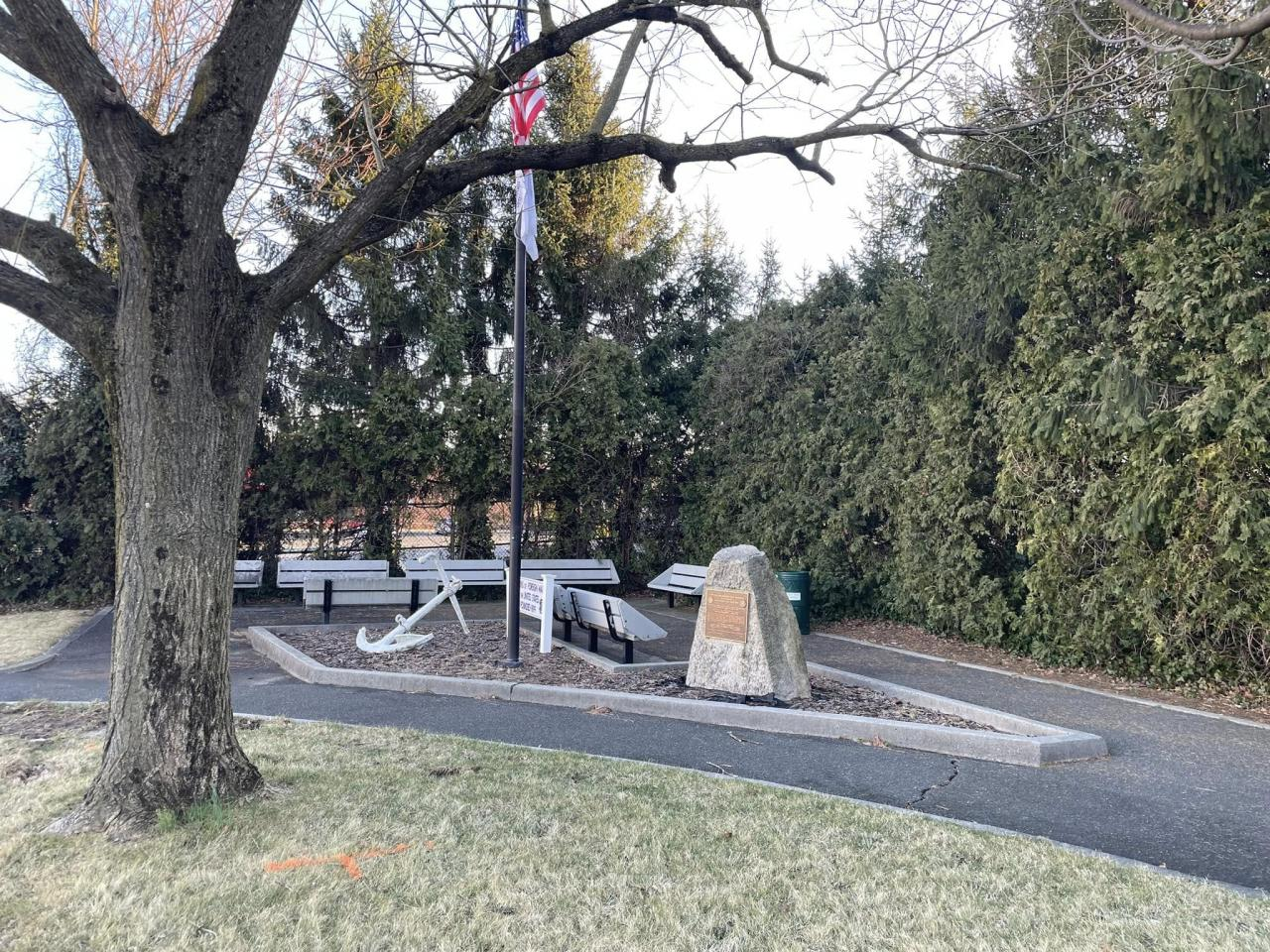
- VFW Memorial Park, seen in 2025
- Interactive map of Veterans of Foreign Wars Memorial Park
- Type: Public
- Location: Manhasset, New York, United States
- Coordinates: 40°47′34.7″N 73°41′39.1″W
- Opened: June 9, 1997
- Designer: James M. Gilhooly
- Owned by: Manhasset Park District
- Operated by: Manhasset Park District
- Website: manhassetparkdistrictny.gov

Veterans of Foreign Wars Memorial Park (also known as Manhasset VFW Memorial Park, Charles G. Derderian Veterans of Foreign Wars Memorial Park, and simply Veterans of Foreign Wars Memorial) is a park and memorial located in Manhasset, New York, United States.

The park is owned and operated by the Manhasset Park District.

== Description ==
Veterans of Foreign Wars Memorial Park is located at the corner of Northern Boulevard (NY 25A) and Shelter Rock Road (CR 8). It is dedicated to all of the Manhasset community's veterans, and to the USS Manhasset. The park consists of the Manhasset Veterans of Foreign Wars Memorial, benches, and pathways.

The park is honorifically named in honor of the late United States Coast Guard World War II veteran Charles G. Derderian, who was a longtime Manhasset resident who helped establish the park.

The park was designed by architect James M. Gilhooly.

== Memorial ==
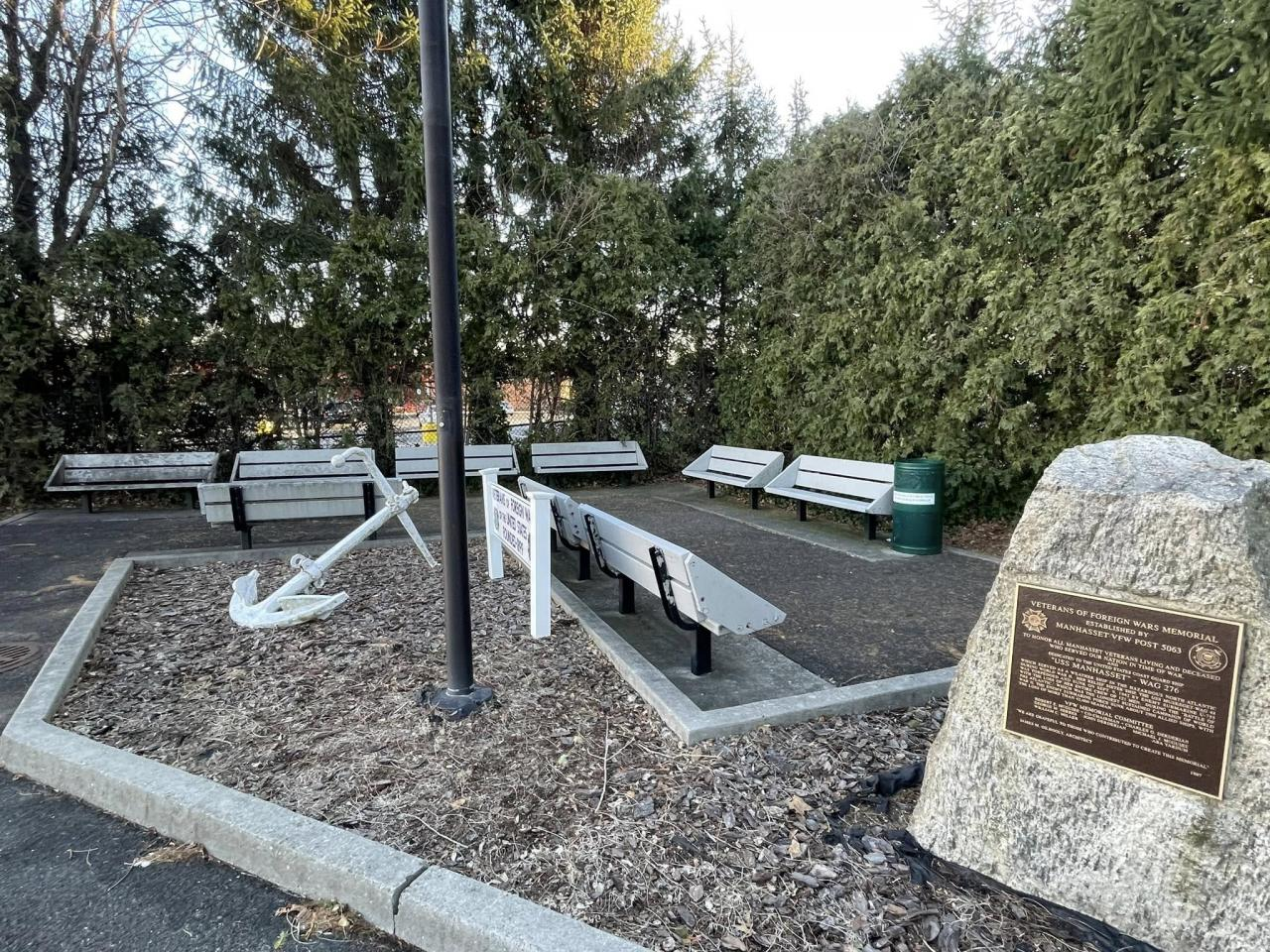
The memorial at the park in 2025, with the monument and plaque visible at right

The park features the Manhasset Veterans of Foreign War Memorial. Erected by Manhasset VFW Post 5063 for the park's opening in 1997, the memorial includes a monument and plaque that states the park's purpose, a history of the USS Manhasset, the architect, and the members of the VFW Memorial Committee, which was responsible for the memorial's erection.

=== Plaque ===
The memorial and dedication plaque in the park includes the following text:

Veterans of Foreign Wars Memorial

Established by

Manhasset VFW Post 5063

To honor all Manhasset veterans living and deceased who served our nation in time of war.

And

Dedicated to the United States Coast Guard ship

“USS Manhasset” – WAG 276

Which served as a weather ship in the hazardous North Atlantic during World War II. Her relief sister ship, the USS Muskeget-WAG 48 was torpedoed and sunk on Sept. 9, 1942 by enemy submarine U-755 with the loss of her entire crew of 121 men. During the “Battle of the Atlantic,” which was the longest sustained campaign of World War II, the enemy submarine force sunk about 2900 Allied ships, with the loss of more than 42,000 seaman.

VFW Memorial Committee

Robert E. McGuire • Co-Chairman • Charles G. Derderian

George M. Serres • John Derderian • Michael J. McGuire

William C. Miller • Ara Yardum

“We are grateful to those who contributed to create this memorial”

James M. Gilhooly, Architect

1997

== See also ==
- Islandia Veterans Memorial Triangle
- Rainbow Monument Park
