= Levittown =

1950s housing developments in the United States

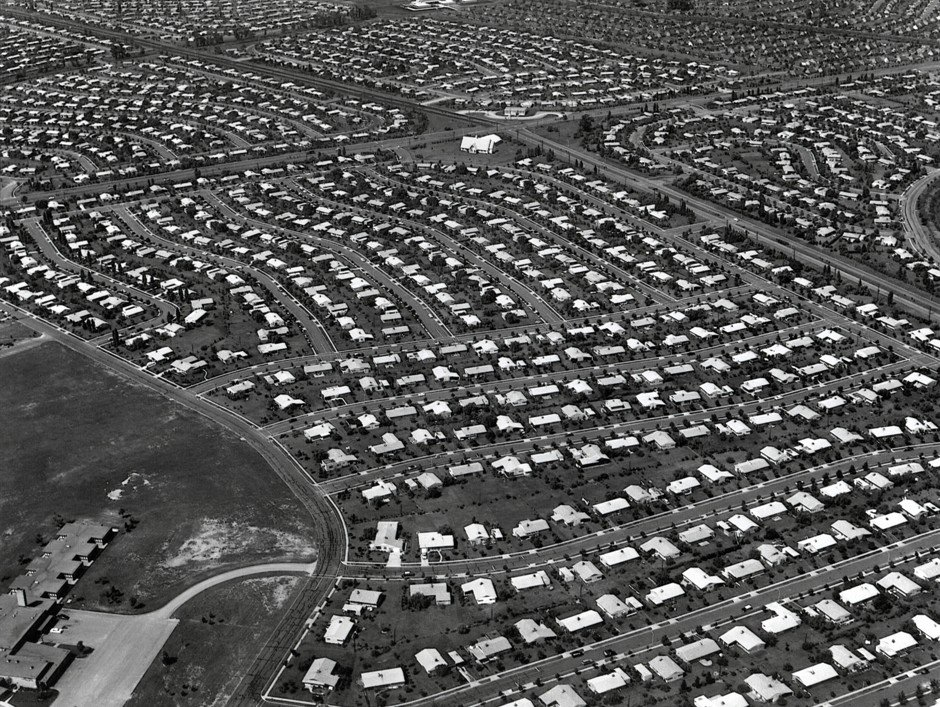
Aerial view of Levittown, Pennsylvania c. 1959

Levittowns are six large suburban housing developments, three of which are actually named "Levittown." They were created in the United States (including one in Puerto Rico) by William J. Levitt and his company Levitt & Sons. Built after World War II for returning white veterans and their new families, the communities offered attractive alternatives to cramped central city locations and apartments. The Veterans Administration and the Federal Housing Administration (FHA) guaranteed builders that qualified veterans could buy housing for a fraction of rental costs. Under Levitt & Sons, Levittown housing would maintain racial covenants that excluded non-White would-be buyers.

The first Levittown house sold for $7,900, and in a short period of time 17,000 units were sold, providing homes for 84,000 people. In addition to single-family dwellings, Levittowns provided private meeting areas, swimming pools, public parks, and recreational facilities.

Production was modeled on assembly lines in 27 steps with construction workers trained to perform one step. A house could be built in one day, with 36 workers, when effectively scheduled. This enabled quick and economical production of similar or identical houses with rapid recovery of costs. Standard Levittown houses included a white picket fence, green lawns, and modern appliances. Sales in the original Levittown began in March 1947. 1,400 houses were purchased during the first three hours.

The houses were, by later standards, quite small: 750 sq ft (70 m^{2}), with no basement or porch.

== Places ==
- Levittown, New York – the first Levittown (built 1947–1951)
- Levittown, Pennsylvania – the second Levittown (1952–1958)
- Willingboro Township, New Jersey – originally and colloquially known as Levittown (started 1958)
- Levittown, Puerto Rico (1963)
- Bowie, Maryland (Belair at Bowie) (1964)
- Greenbriar, Virginia (1966–1971)

== Racial policies ==
William J. Levitt refused to sell Levittown houses to people of color. The FHA included racial covenants in each deed when authorizing Levittown loans, making each Levittown a segregated community. However this did not affect who the houses were resold to.

In 1957, William and Daisy Myers bought a second-hand house at 43 Deepgreen Lane in Pennsylvania's Levittown. William was a World War II army veteran and Daisy was a school teacher. The couple had three young children at the time. Attacks began immediately in the previously all-white neighborhood. For days, members of the community would gather hundreds at a time outside the Myers' home in violent demonstrations. Townspeople formed a group called the "Levittown Betterment Committee", dedicated to evicting the Myers and making Levittown all white once more. They would meet in a nearby home, which they dubbed "The Confederate House." The Confederate flag flew outside and "Dixie" was blasted on repeat from a record player.

The Myers' struggle gained national attention. The Quakers, American Jewish Congress, and the William Penn Center helped organize a 24-7 citizen patrol. White couples volunteered to babysit the Myers’ children and cleaned up damage in the wake of attacks. Martin Luther King Jr. and other black civil rights leaders met with the family and wrote to them.

The couple managed to stay four years more, until William Myers got a job in Harrisburg, Pennsylvania. Their plight helped lead to the passage of the Fair Housing Act in 1968.

== Gallery ==
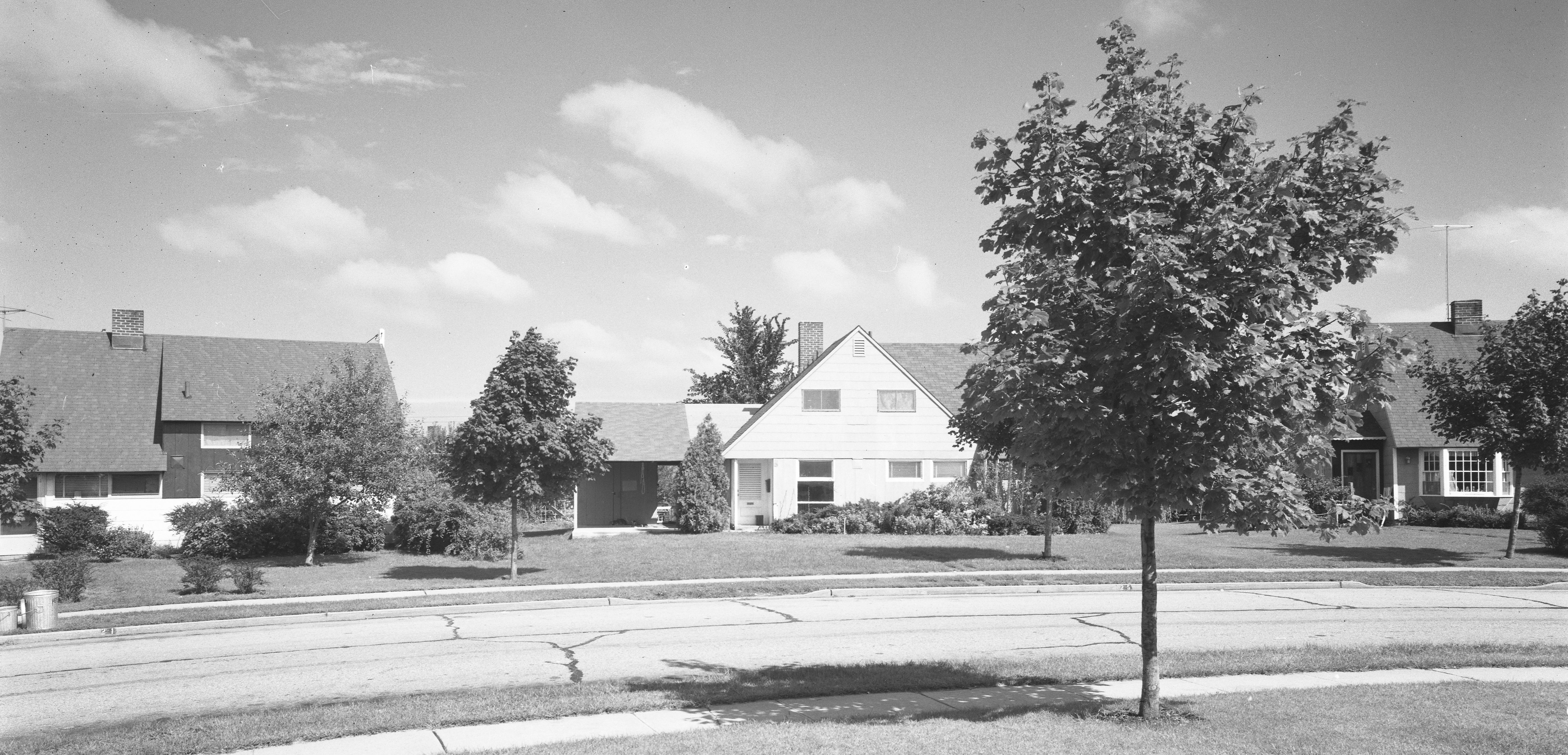
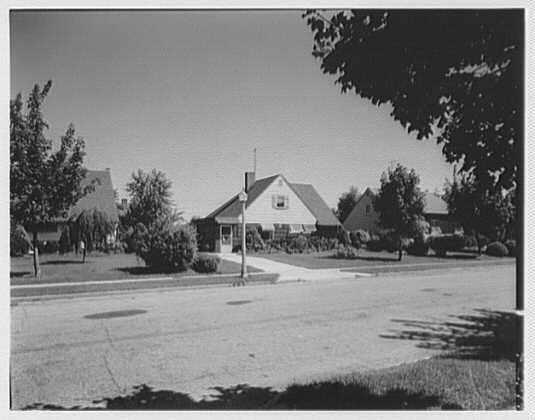
Levittown houses in New York in 1958

== See also ==
- Redlining
- White flight
