= List of Levitt & Sons Housing Developments on Long Island =

This article contains a list of the housing developments built by Levitt & Sons on Long Island, in the State of New York.

== Description ==
=== Background ===
During the 20th century, Long Island (and the United States, as a whole) saw a pattern of mass suburbanization. Levitt and Sons – one of the era's major real estate firms – built many housing developments across Long Island (and the United States, as a whole), including Levittown, New York – which is widely considered as being America's first mass-produced suburb, and also as the community which set the standards in post-war neighborhood designs.

==== Controversial discriminatory housing practices ====
Levitt & Sons was the center of much controversy over the decades for its discriminatory and segregational housing practices. During much of the first half of the 20th century, they refused to sell to People of Color and people of the Jewish faith in many of their developments (despite the fact that the Levitts were themselves Jewish), as, at the time, the Federal Housing Administration still allowed these policies in public housing developments, at the developer's discretion, with reasoning. The FHA even discouraged developers from selling to non-Whites by refusing to offer mortgages to communities that were racially integrated.

== List of Long Island Levitt and Sons communities ==
List of Levitt & Sons communities on Long Island, NY:
Name	Location	Year(s) constructed	Notes
Strathmore at Rockville Centre	Rockville Centre	1929-19??	
Strathmore-Vanderbilt	Manhasset	1930s	
Strathmore at Great Neck	Great Neck	1938	
Strathmore at Manhasset	Manhasset	19??	
Strathmore Village at Manhasset	Manhasset	19??	
Munsey Park	Munsey Park	1944–1953	Only land sales.
West Park	Westbury	1946	
Levittown, NY	Towns of Hempstead & Oyster Bay	1946–1951	This Levitt development is known for being the first large-scale, suburban planned community in the USA.
Roslyn Country Club	Roslyn Heights	1946–1947	
Strathmore at Roslyn	East Hills	1947–1948	Development description, houses, and brochure (1947); The exhibit home's address was 2 Circle Lane.
Country Club Estates	Roslyn	1949	Built on the land of the former Draper Estate.
Strathmore at Flower Hill	Flower Hill	1948-195?	Never built; would have been built over a portion of the former Munson Estate.
South Strathmore	Manhasset	1949	
Landia (unbuilt)	Jericho	1951	Never built; deposits were refunded, and the land was sold to Gross Morton.
Strathmore at Stony Brook	Stony Brook	1963	
Tanglewood at Coram	Coram	1966–1967	
Strathmore East	Coram	1967-197?	Development description, houses, & brochures (1972 & 1973)
Strathmore Village	Stony Brook	1960s	
Setauket Gables	East Setauket	196?–1969	
Strathmore Village (now known as South Setauket Park)	Centereach	1969-1975	671 homes
Strathmore at Huntington (includes Strathmore Hills)	Dix Hills	1967–1971 & 1969–1971, respectively	
Strathmore Gate	Stony Brook	1971–1972	
Strathmore Gate East	Stony Brook	1972-197?	
Strathmore Glen	City of Glen Cove	1972	Development description, houses, and brochure (1972)
Strathmore Ridge	Ridge	1972	
Strathmore Estates	Coram	1973	
Strathmore Estates	Mt. Sinai	1975	
Woodcrest at Coram	Coram	1985	
Manor Woods Estates	Manorville	1986	
Fox Ridge	??	19??	

== See also ==
- Levitt & Sons – the main article for the firm which built these developments
- Levittown, New York – the main article for Levittown (also known as Island Trees/Jerusalem), New York
- Levittown – the seven Levitt developments known as (or formerly known as) "Levittown"
