= Levitt & Sons =

Real estate company

- Industry: Real estate development
- Founder: William Levitt
- Defunct: 2007
- Fate: Chapter 11 bankruptcy
- Successor: Woodbridge Holdings Corporation
- Area served: United States, Canada, France, Spain

Levitt & Sons was a real estate development company founded by Abraham Levitt and later managed by his son William Levitt. The company built the town of Levittown, New York. The company's designs and building practices transformed the home building industry and altered the north eastern landscape of the United States with massive suburban communities.

Levitt & Sons was America's biggest home builder by 1951, and William Levitt was named one of the 100 most influential people of the 20th century. Historian Kenneth T. Jackson wrote of Levitt & Sons, "The family that had the greatest impact on postwar housing in the United States was Abraham Levitt and his sons, William and Alfred, who ultimately built more than 140,000 houses and turned a cottage industry into a major manufacturing process."

== Founding and early years ==
Abraham Levitt founded a real-estate development company near the start of the Great Depression. His son William became company president at the age of 22, handling the advertising, sales, and financing. Alfred Levitt, still a teenager, became vice president of design and drafted plans for the first Levitt house, a six bedroom, two bathroom Tudor style home that sold for over $14,000 in 1929 (roughly $263,000 today). The Levitts sold 600 of these upper-middle-class homes, part of the Strathmore project, in four years during the Great Depression.

William earned a reputation as the person to see for high-end, custom homes on the North Shore of New York's Long Island, called the Gold Coast. Prior to World War II, Levitt & Sons built mostly upscale housing on and around Long Island. During the 1930s, they built the North Strathmore community at Manhasset, New York, on the former Onderdonk farm. The North Strathmore homes sold for $9,100 to $18,500. The Levitts built another 1,200 homes in Manhasset, Great Neck, and Westchester County. Radio stars, prominent journalists, surgeons, business people, and lawyers bought the upscale Levitt houses. Levitt & Sons also built Strathmore at Roslyn a few years later, in the late 1940s.

== Construction of Levittown, New York ==
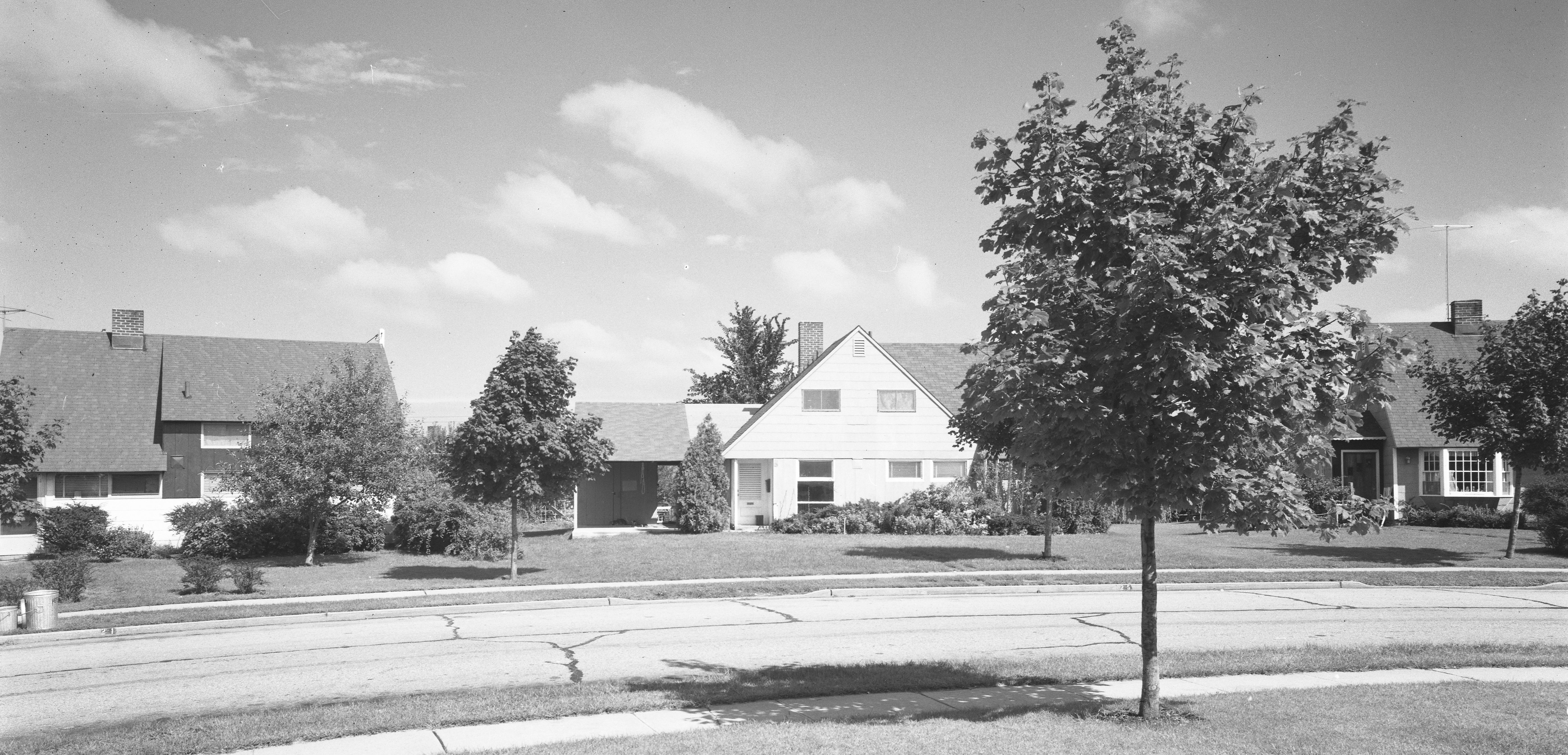
Levittown houses in 1958

After World War II, America's post-war prosperity and baby boom had created a crisis of affordable housing, especially for returning veterans. Levitt & Sons chose an area known as Island Trees near Hempstead, Long Island, as the site for a huge building project for housing these veterans. The company named it Levittown.

The community was planned to have 6,000 low-priced homes, making it much larger than any other U.S. development. The company bought 1,000 acres (400 ha) of potato farms on Long Island. On July 1, 1947, Levitt & Sons broke ground on the $50 million ($721 million today) development of Levittown, which ultimately included 17,500 homes on 7.3 square miles of land. Alfred created the mass production techniques and designed the homes and the layout of the development, with its curving streets. Abraham directed the landscaping, whose focus was two trees to each front yard, all planted exactly the same distance apart. William was the financier and promoter, who persuaded lawmakers to rewrite the laws that made Levittown possible. The houses, which were in the Cape Cod and ranch house styles, sat on a quarter-acre (0.09 ha) lot. They had 750 square feet (70 m^{2}) with two bedrooms, a living room with a television and a kitchen with modern appliances, an unfinished second floor and no garage.

Levitt's innovation in creating this planned community was to build the houses in the manner of an assembly line. In normal assembly lines, the workers stay stationary and the product moves down the line; in Levitt's homebuilding assembly line, the product—the houses—stayed in place and specialized workers moved from house to house. The assembly line construction method allowed Levittown to be constructed more efficiently than other development at the time, with teams of specialized workers following each other from house to house to complete incremental steps in the construction. Levitt also reduced costs by freezing out union labor – a move which provoked picket lines – enabling him to use the latest technology, such as spray painting. He also cut out middlemen and purchased many items, including lumber and televisions, directly from manufacturers, as well as constructing his own factory to produce nails. The building of every house was reduced to 26 steps, and sub-contractors were responsible for each step.

During the project, Levitt & Sons emphasized speed, efficiency, and cost-effective construction; these methods led to a production rate of 30 houses a day by July 1948. The mass production of thousands of houses at virtually the same time allowed the company to sell them for as little as $8,000 each (equivalent to $115,350 in 2025), which, with the G.I. Bill and Federal housing subsidies, reduced the up-front cost of a house to many buyers to around $400.

Levitt & Sons was the cover story in Time magazine for July 3, 1950. William Levitt was pictured on the cover, with the tag line "For Sale: a new way of life."

=== Discriminatory practices ===
As well as a symbol of the American Dream, Levittown would also become a symbol of racial segregation, due to Clause 25 of the standard lease agreement signed by the first residents of Levittown, who had an option to buy their homes. This "restrictive covenant" stated in capital letters and bold type that the house could not "be used or occupied by any person other than members of the Caucasian race."

Such discriminatory housing standards were consistent with government policies of the time. The Federal Housing Administration allowed developers to justify segregation within public housing. The FHA only offered mortgages to non-mixed developments which discouraged developers from creating racially integrated housing. Before the sale of Levittown homes began, the sales agents were aware that no applications from black families would be accepted. As a result, American veterans who wished to purchase a home in Levittown were unable to do so if they were black.

William Levitt justified their decision to only sell homes to white families by saying that it was in the best interest for business. He claimed their actions were not discriminatory but intended to maintain the value of their properties. The company explained that it was not possible to reduce racial segregation while they were attempting to reduce the housing shortage. Levitt said "As a Jew, I have no room in my heart for racial prejudice. But the plain fact is that most whites prefer not to live in mixed communities. This attitude may be wrong morally, and someday it may change. I hope it will." The Levitts explained that they would open up applications to blacks after they had sold as many homes to white people as possible. They believed that potential white buyers would not want to buy a house in Levittown if they were aware that they would have black neighbors.

An opposition group was formed, the Committee to End Discrimination in Levittown, to protest the restricted sale of Levittown homes, and to push for an integrated community. In 1948 a ruling in another case by the United States Supreme Court declared that property deeds stipulating racial segregation were "unenforceable as law and contrary to public policy". Only well after the 1954 racial integration decisions, including Brown v. Board of Education, was Levittown racially integrated, and even as late as the 1990 census only a tiny fraction of the community was non-white, a stigma that still exists.

== Other Levittown projects ==
The Levitts went on to plan and build another community of more than 17,000 homes in Levittown, Pennsylvania, which saw its first residents in 1952. Willingboro, New Jersey, was built as a Levittown in 1958, and bears several Levittown-specific street names such as Levitt Parkway (renamed Veterans Parkway on November 1, 2022).

Discord in the Levitt family caused a split in 1954. Alfred left the company, and William took full control of Levitt & Sons. During the late 1950s, Levitt and Sons developed the community known as "Belair at Bowie," in Bowie, Maryland. In 1957 they acquired the historic Belair Mansion and estate, home of Maryland's colonial Governor Samuel Ogle and his Belair Stables. In 1959 the community was annexed by Bowie.

The company went public in 1960. Through the 1960s, the Levitts constructed houses in six Eastern states.

In 1961, the company started development in Aberdeen, New Jersey (formerly Matawan Township), known as "Strathmore at Matawan." the Strathmore name had originally been used by Levitt & Sons in its upper middle class developments on Long Island in the 1930s. Levittown, Puerto Rico, built in the 1960s, was a Levitt project. In 1966, Levitt & Sons built a development in Somerset, New Jersey, and in 1966–72, it built another development in Greenbriar, Virginia. In 1967, the company developed Montpelier, Maryland, near Laurel.

Levitt & Sons also built internationally. The company built a large development near Paris at Lésigny in Seine-et-Marne, and at Mennecy in Essonne, France. By the late 1960s, Levitt & Sons had built more than 140,000 houses.

== Under ITT ==
Levitt & Sons was sold to ITT in 1968 for a reported $90 million ($870 million today). The company continued to build housing developments as an ITT subsidiary, under a variety of names that usually included "Levitt". Development in Florida started two years later.

In the United States, Levitt houses were built in the states of Arizona, California, Florida, Georgia, Illinois, Kentucky, Maryland, Nevada, New Hampshire, New Jersey, New York, Oregon, Pennsylvania, Virginia, and Washington, as well as in Puerto Rico. Around the world, Levitt houses were built in Canada, France, and Spain.

== Later years ==
Starrett Housing Corporation purchased ITT's Levitt subsidiary in 1979. Houses continued to be built in Florida, Illinois, New York, and Virginia. A completely separate company called Levitt Homes Corp. operated in Puerto Rico during the 1980s.

Levitt was sold to BankAtlantic in 1999. In 2003, Levitt was established as independent entity from BankAtlantic.

Levitt & Sons were restricted to building in Florida alone by the 2000s. Levitt filed for Chapter 11 bankruptcy in late 2007 as a result of the housing crash. The parent company was renamed in 2008 to Woodbridge Holdings Corporation, which shortly afterwards ceased trading on the New York Stock Exchange.

Private investment company Oak Point Partners acquired the remnant assets, consisting of any known and unknown assets that weren't previously administered, from the Levitt and Sons, LLC, et al., Bankruptcy Estates on October 30, 2013.

== See also ==
- Levittown, New York
- Levittown, Pennsylvania
- Willingboro Township (Levittown), New Jersey
- Levittown, Puerto Rico
- List of Levitt & Sons Housing Developments on Long Island
- Levittown
