= Horatio Gates Onderdonk House =

Historic house in New York, United States

- U.S. National Register of Historic Places
- Town of North Hempstead Designated Landmark
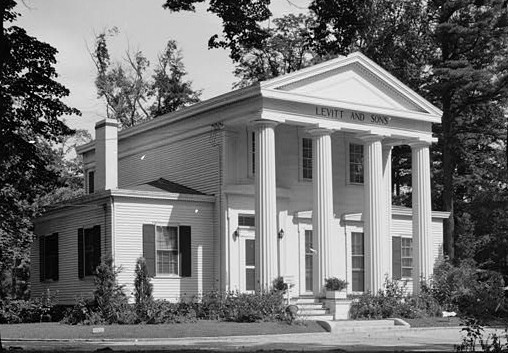
- Judge Horatio Gates Onderdonk House from the south, August 1935

- Location within New York Location within the United States
- Location: 1471 Northern Blvd., Manhasset, New York
- Coordinates: 40°47′38.5″N 73°41′32″W
- Area: less than one acre
- Built: 1836
- Architect: Alart, Ian; Thomas, William
- Architectural style: Greek Revival
- NRHP reference No.: 80002661

Significant dates
- Added to NRHP: April 16, 1980
- Designated TNHDL: July 23, 1985

The Horatio Gates Onderdonk House is a historic home in Strathmore, New York, an unincorporated hamlet in the Town of North Hempstead in Nassau County, on the North Shore of Long Island, United States

== Description ==
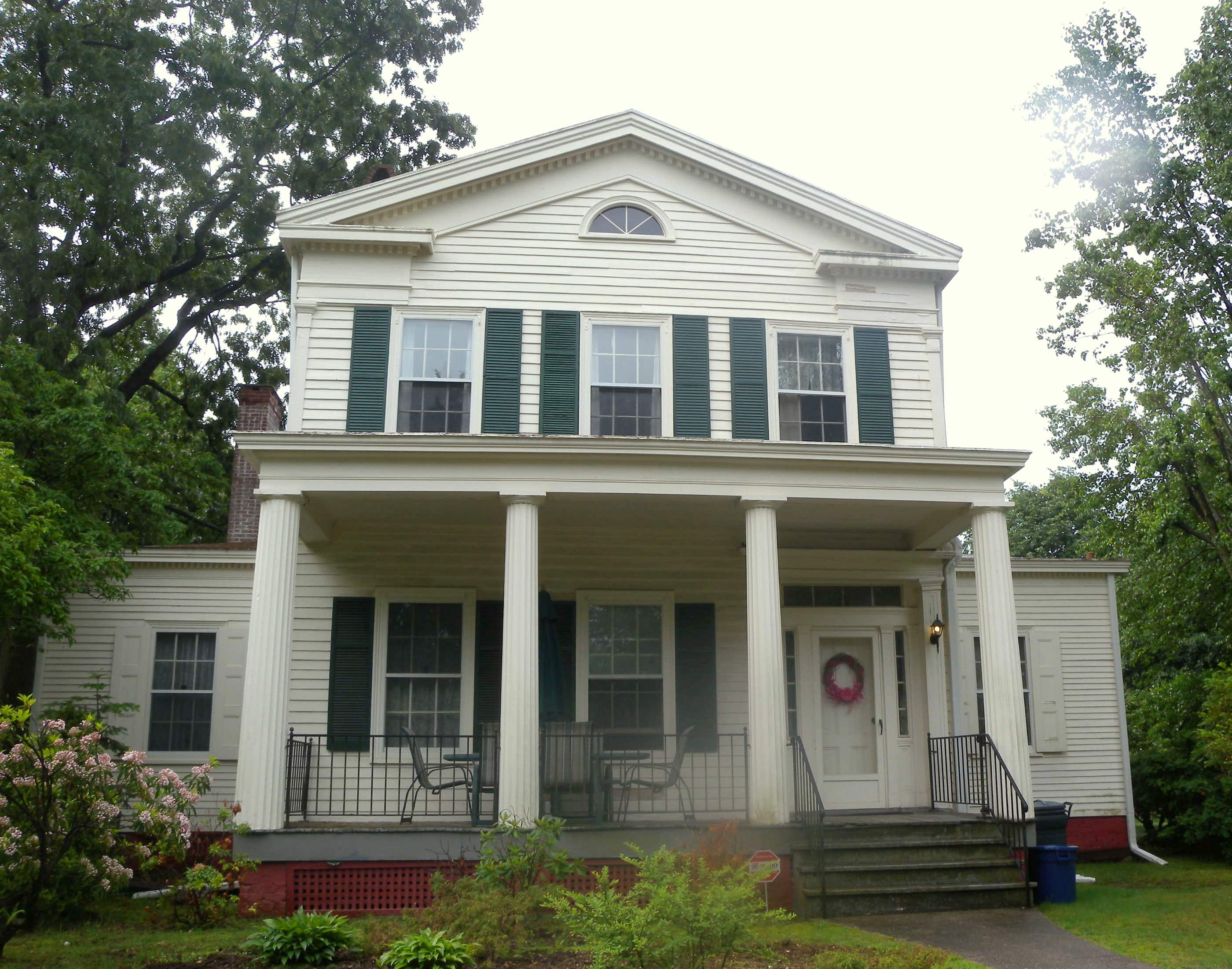
North side in 2011

The two-story Greek Revival home was built in 1836, with a three bay central mass flanked by one story, one bay wings. It features a giant portico supported by four Doric order columns. By 1933, the Onderdonk farm was purchased for development by Levitt and Sons, who built the neighboring North Strathmore community. The house served as an office facility for the development, until the formation of the Strathmore Association, a membership organization composed of the owners of Strathmore property. The house and four corner plots adjoining "The Circle" were conveyed to the association on December 3, 1936, and the property has been maintained by the Strathmore Association since that time.

It was listed on the National Register of Historic Places in 1980. Five years later, on May 23, 1985, it was listed as a Town of North Hempstead Designated Landmark.
