= Manhasset Park District =

Government agency in Greater Manhasset, Nassau County, New York

- Seal of the Manhasset Park District

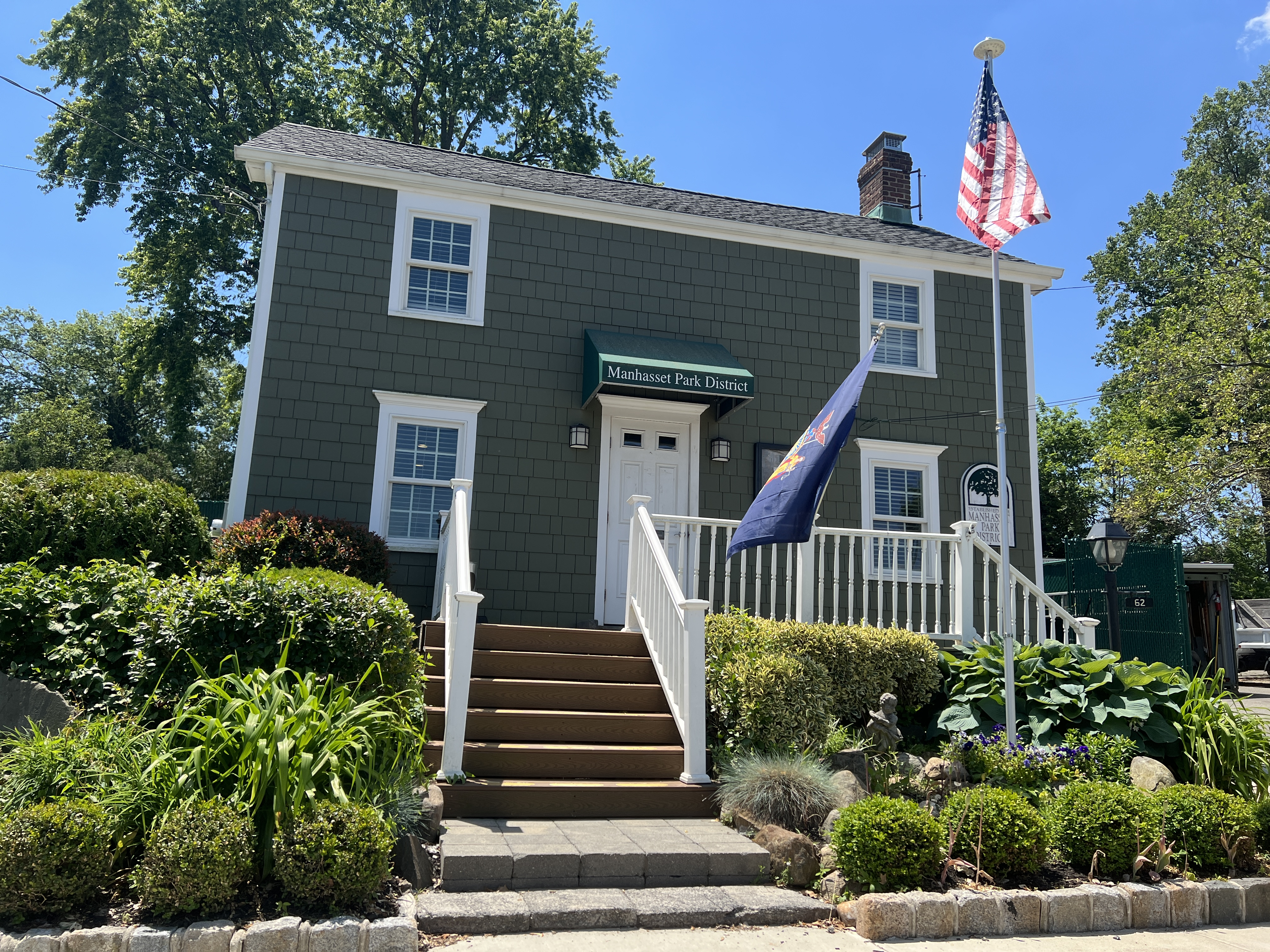
- The Manhasset Park District's administrative headquarters in 2022

Park district overview
- Formed: July 5, 1921
- Jurisdiction: Greater Manhasset
- Headquarters: 62 Manhasset Avenue, Manhasset, NY 11030; 40°47′43.5″N 73°42′4.5″W
- Park district executives: Ken Weigand, Chairman; Mark Sauvigne, Treasurer; David Paterson, Secretary
- Website: https://manhassetparkdistrictny.gov/

The Manhasset Park District (officially known as the Manhasset Park and Parking District, and abbreviated MPD) is a park district serving much of the Greater Manhasset area of Nassau County, Long Island, New York, United States. It is headquartered at 62 Manhasset Avenue, within the hamlet of Manhasset.

== History ==
The Manhasset Park District was established on July 5, 1921, with its founding board consisting of Josephine Boyer, James L. Dowsey, and Stephen H. Mason.

In the late 1940s, there was a controversial, failed proposal to build a 3-acre park in the northern part of the Strathmore area of Manhasset; this area is called North Strathmore. It was argued that all of Greater Manhasset would be paying for a park which only North Strathmore residents would be able to use. When the vote on the $45,000 (1949 USD) bond referendum was held, the referendum was rejected, and consequently, the Manhasset Park District never built the park.

In 1974, the Village of Roslyn Estates unsuccessfully attempted to have the district's boundaries redrawn to include the village after the district added 260 parking spaces to the commuter parking fields at the Manhasset Long Island Rail Road station. Its Mayor, Robert D. Zucker, stated that Roslyn Estates residents preferred the Manhasset station over the closer Roslyn station due to the how service to/from Pennsylvania Station on the Port Washington Branch is direct, whereas a change at Jamaica is required on the Oyster Bay Branch. Roslyn Estates residents would have the ability to be guaranteed a parking space at the Manhasset station for commuting to/from Manhattan if the boundaries were redrawn to include the village. District and North Hempstead officials, along with Manhasset residents, were against redrawing the boundaries to include Roslyn Estates, given that Roslyn Estates is part of the Greater Roslyn area (as opposed to being part of Greater Manhasset), and felt that the needs of Greater Manhasset should be the Manhasset Park District's main focus.

In the 1990s, over 1,000 district residents petitioned for the Manhasset Park District to purchase the Strathmore Bath Club, in order to keep it operating as a public park and recreational center. The plan was unsuccessful, and the club, its pool, and grounds were demolished and the land was subdivided, ultimately being replaced with single-family homes and an expanding parking lot for the adjacent shopping center.

In 2020, during the COVID-19 pandemic and related social distancing measures, the Manhasset Park District converted a small portion of Commuter Parking Lot 7 into a new pocket park. Known as Heroes' Plaza, this green space consists of landscaping, seating, and tables. That same year, the district assumed responsibilities for the landscaping at the Manhasset LIRR station from the Metropolitan Transportation Authority, after the community expressed a desire for such a takeover, in order to beautify the grounds at the station.

== District governance ==
The Manhasset Park District is governed by a three-member board of commissioners, known as the Manhasset Park District Board of Commissioners. This board consists of a chair, a treasurer, and a secretary – all three of whom reside within the district and are elected to the Board by the residents of the district.

As of April 2026, the Chairman of the Manhasset Park District Board of Commissioners is Ken Weigand, the Treasurer is Mark Sauvigne, and the Secretary is David Paterson.

== Service area ==
The Manhasset Park District serves the following communities in Manhasset:

- Manhasset (including Strathmore)
- Munsey Park
- Plandome Heights
- Parts of Flower Hill
- Parts of North Hills
- Parts of Plandome Manor

== District facilities ==
=== Public parks ===
The Manhasset Park District operates the following parks and recreational facilities:

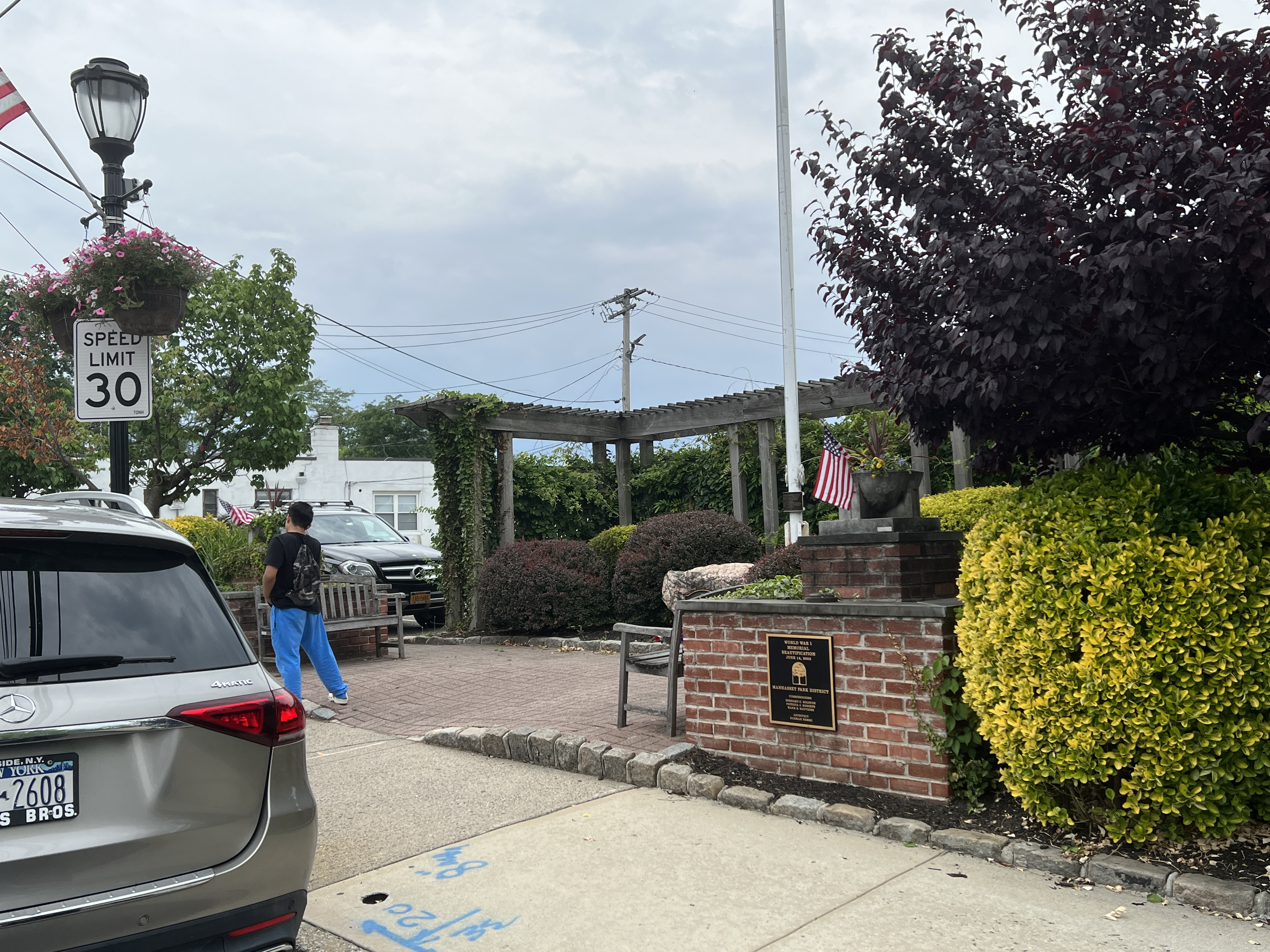
The Manhasset World War I Memorial in 2023

- Four Acre Park
- Heroes' Plaza
- Park Avenue Park
- Patriot's Park
- Veterans of Foreign Wars Memorial Park
- World War I Memorial

=== Parking fields ===
The Manhasset Park District additionally maintains multiple parking fields throughout Manhasset's downtown area. These district-operated parking facilities include commuter lots, shoppers' parking fields, and merchants' lots.

==== Manhasset LIRR parking ====
The district additionally owns and operates commuter parking lots at the Manhasset station on the Long Island Rail Road's Port Washington Branch. These lots are typically reserved primarily for district residents with a valid, district-issued parking permit, with limited parking spaces for non-residents and other, non-permit holders also available on a first-come, first-serve basis at an increased parking fee rate.

== See also ==
- Great Neck Park District – Another park district on Long Island, in the adjacent area of Great Neck.
- Port Washington Parking District
- Merriman Park (Port Washington, New York)
- Clinton G. Martin Park
