= Islandia Veterans Memorial Triangle =

Park in Islandia, New York, United States

- Interactive map of Islandia Veterans Memorial Triangle
- Type: Public; Veterans Memorial
- Location: Islandia, New York
- Coordinates: 40.802626°N 73.166156°W
- Opened: November 8, 2008
- Owner: Incorporated Village of Islandia

Islandia Veterans Memorial Triangle (also known as Veterans Memorial Triangle and Veterans Triangle) is a park and veterans memorial located within the Incorporated Village of Islandia, in Suffolk County, New York, United States.

== Description ==
Veterans Memorial Triangle occupies the triangle in the middle of the intersection of Old Nichols Road and Johnson Avenue. It contains a plaza with a large veterans memorial monument in the center, as well as a smaller monument with the memorial plaque, in front of three flagpoles. Another smaller monument and plaque in the park, near the entrance, lists the village residents who have served in the United States Armed Forces.

The main monument features four faces, honoring the United States Army, the United States Navy, the United States Air Force, and the United States Marine Corps; each face has the motto of the respective branch engraved on it, with the respective branch's emblem appearing above it on a round medallion measuring 24 inches (61 cm) in diameter. The top of the main monument features an eternal flame.

The park is also the site of the Village of Islandia's annual Veterans Day and Memorial Day ceremonies.

== History ==
Veterans Memorial Triangle was constructed in 2008, and was officially opened and dedicated that November, on Veterans Day. It was funded with revenues raised from the businesses in the village.

In January 2017, the Marine Corps medallion was stolen from the main monument, sparking public outrage from residents and village officials and the promise of a $5,000 reward from the Village of Islandia for information leading to the apprehension of the suspects. The medallion and monument were subsequently repaired in time for the village's Memorial Day ceremony that spring.

== See also ==
- New York State Route 454 – Officially known as Suffolk County Veterans Memorial Highway; passes through Islandia.
- Rainbow Monument Park – A triangular park in nearby Garden City, featuring a veterans memorial.
