= Greenbriar, Virginia =

- Census-designated place
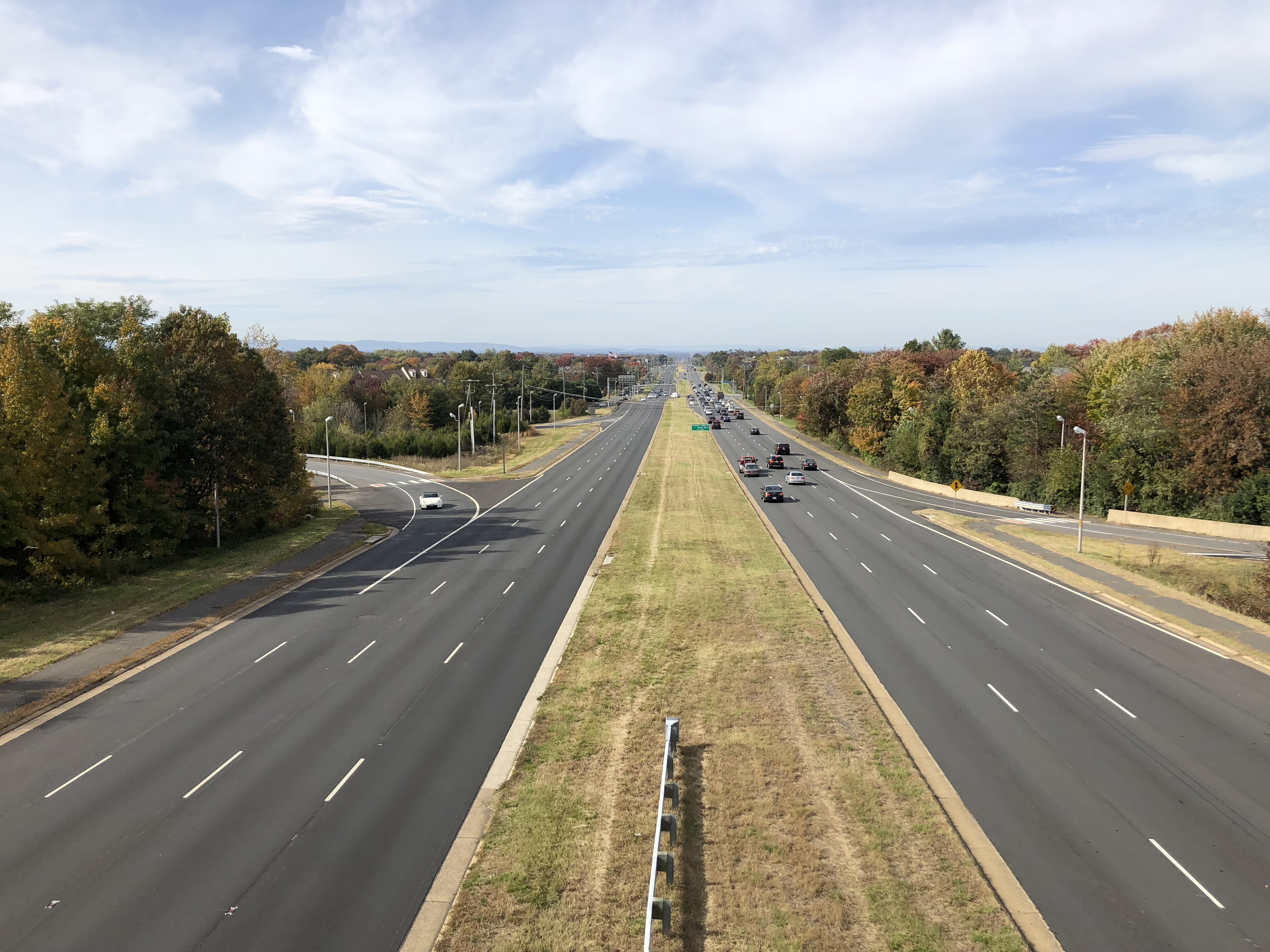
- Route 50 on the northern edge of Greenbriar

- Location within Northern Virginia Location within Virginia Location within the United States
- Coordinates: 38°52′18″N 77°23′57″W
- Country: United States
- State: Virginia
- County: Fairfax

Area
  - Total: 1.58 sq mi (4.08 km^{2})
  - Land: 1.57 sq mi (4.06 km^{2})
  - Water: 0.0077 sq mi (0.02 km^{2})
- Elevation: 365 ft (111 m)

Population (2020)
  - Total: 8,421
  - Density: 5,372/sq mi (2,074.1/km^{2})
- Time zone: UTC−5 (Eastern (EST))
  - Summer (DST): UTC−4 (EDT)
- ZIP code: 22033
- FIPS code: 51-32592
- GNIS feature ID: 2584853

Greenbriar is a census-designated place in Fairfax County, Virginia, United States. The population at the 2020 census was 8,421. The community, between Fairfax City and Chantilly, dates from the late 1960s, when it was developed by Levitt & Sons. The community is well-known for having only one road within its territory that does not start with an "M" or "P": Acorn Hill (added in 1994 with the addition of five mansions to the community).

== Geography ==
Greenbriar is located in western Fairfax County, bordered by Chantilly to the west, Fair Lakes to the south, and Fair Oaks to the east. U.S. Route 50 forms the northern border of the CDP. US 50 leads east 5 miles (8 km) to the center of Fairfax, and 22 miles (35 km) to downtown Washington, D.C. According to the U.S. Census Bureau, the Greenbriar CDP has a total area of 1.6 square miles (4.1 km^{2}), of which 0.01 square miles (0.02 km^{2}), or 0.54%, is water.

== Demographics ==
Historical population
Census	Pop.	Note	%±
2010	8,166		—
2020	8,421		3.1%
U.S. Decennial Census; 2010 2020

Greenbriar was first listed as a census-designated place in the 2010 U.S. census formed from part of Chantilly CDP.

=== 2020 census ===
Greenbriar CDP, Virginia – Racial and ethnic composition Note: the US Census treats Hispanic/Latino as an ethnic category. This table excludes Latinos from the racial categories and assigns them to a separate category. Hispanics/Latinos may be of any race.
Race / Ethnicity (NH = Non-Hispanic)	Pop 2010	Pop 2020	% 2010	% 2020
White alone (NH)	4,992	4,435	61.13%	52.67%
Black or African American alone (NH)	424	437	5.19%	5.19%
Native American or Alaska Native alone (NH)	10	4	0.12%	0.05%
Asian alone (NH)	1,448	2,118	17.73%	25.15%
Native Hawaiian or Pacific Islander alone (NH)	7	4	0.09%	0.05%
Other race alone (NH)	7	47	0.09%	0.56%
Mixed race or Multiracial (NH)	235	412	2.88%	4.89%
Hispanic or Latino (any race)	1,043	964	12.77%	11.45%
Total	8,166	8,421	100.00%	100.00%

This section includes some information from the 2022 American Community Survey

At the 2020 census there were 8,421 people, 3,229 housing units and 3,021 households residing in the CDP. The population density was 5,363.7 inhabitants per square mile (2,074.1/km^{2}). The average housing unit density was 2,056.7 per square mile (795.3/km^{2}). The racial makeup of the CDP was 54.55% White, 5.46% African American, 0.49% Native American, 25.27% Asian, 0.06% Pacific Islander, 4.75% from other races, and 9.42% from two or more races. Hispanic or Latino of any race was 11.45% of the population.

The makeup of households was 2.7% non-family, 56.9% married couple families, 23.7% male head of house with no spouse, and 16.7% female head of house with no spouse. The average family household had 3.17 people.

The median age was 40.3 with 23.4% under the age of 18, and 15.2%, 65 years or older. The largest ancestry group comprises 11.8% of the population, with German ancestry. Additionally, 34.9% of the population speaks a language other than English at home, while 26.5% were born outside the United States. Notably, 42.9% of these individuals were naturalized citizens.

The median income for a household in the CDP was $127,100, and the median income for a family was $159,412. 9.9% of the population were military veterans, and 62.6% had a bachelor's degree or higher. In the CDP 7.2% of the population was below the poverty line, including 8.9% of those under the age of 18 and 4.3% of those aged 65 or over, with 7.3% of the population without health insurance.

=== 2010 census ===
The population at the 2010 census was 8,166.

== Amenities ==
A private pool is located in the community, but pool memberships are not available for sale from the Pool Club. Instead, residents may choose to purchase their memberships from other members who are selling their memberships. Residents sometimes list those memberships for sale in the community newspaper Greenbriar Flyer. Members make an annual payment to cover the costs of the pool's maintenance and staff, as well as for hosting swim meets for residents of other communities around Fairfax County. The swim teams at Greenbriar are known as the Greenbriar Dolphins.

Greenbriar is serviced by a civic association which collects a strictly voluntary $25 annual donation from each owner, which pays for events that the community hosts throughout the year, including Bands in the Park, where during the summer, local music groups will play for residents at Greenbriar Commons Park; as well as the annual community phone Directory.

The Civic Association has no bylaws for residents.
