= Lésigny, Seine-et-Marne =

Lésigny
- Commune
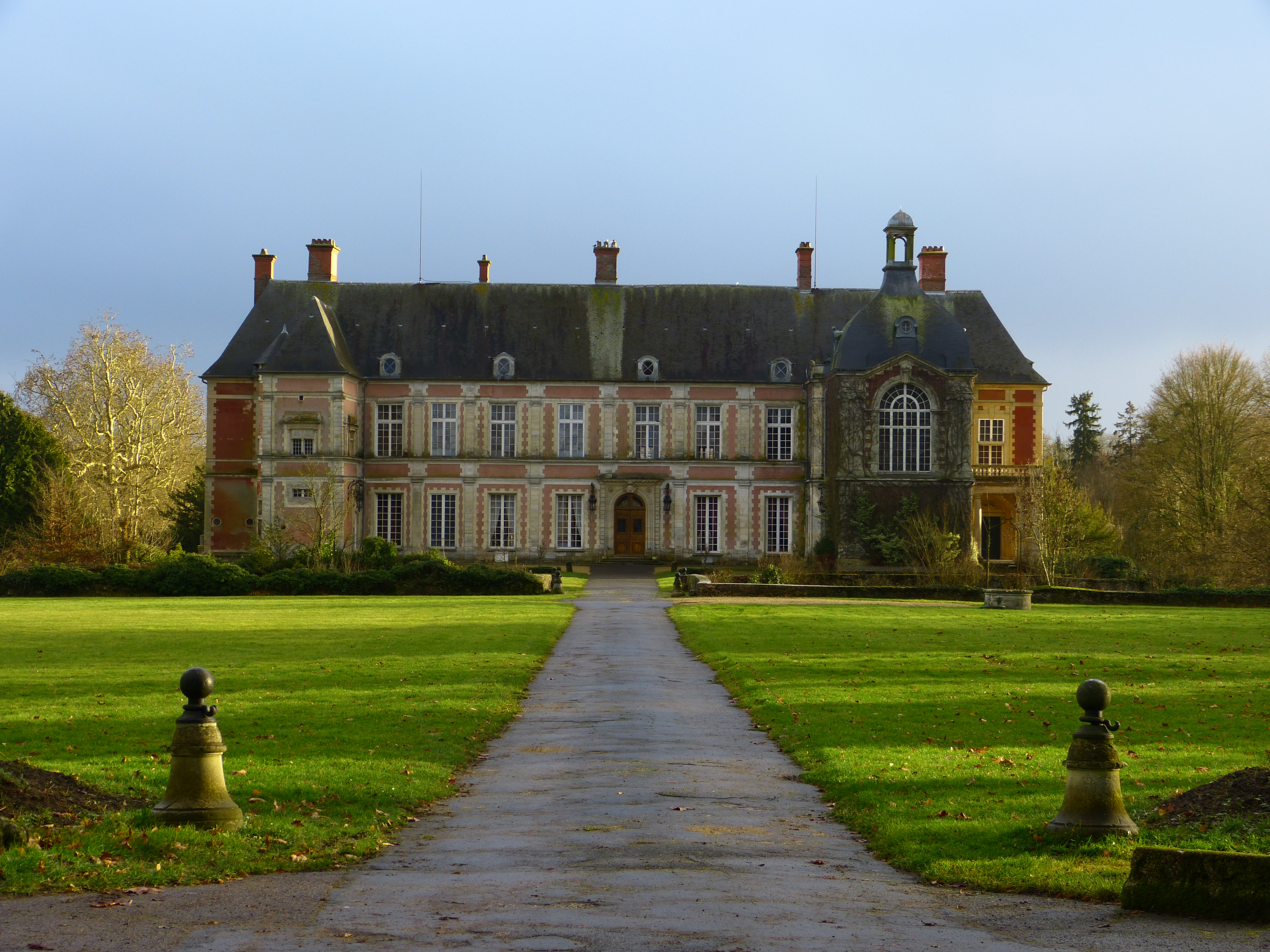
- The chateau in Lésigny

- Coat of arms
- Location of Lésigny
- Location within France Location within Île-de-France (region)
- Coordinates: 48°44′42″N 2°37′00″E
- Country: France
- Region: Île-de-France
- Department: Seine-et-Marne
- Arrondissement: Torcy
- Canton: Ozoir-la-Ferrière

Government
  - Mayor (2020–2026): Michel Papin
- Area^{1}: 10.13 km^{2} (3.91 sq mi)
- Highest elevation: 121 m (397 ft)
- Lowest elevation: 69 m (226 ft)
- Population (2023): 6,923
  - Density: 683.4/km^{2} (1,770/sq mi)
- Time zone: UTC+01:00 (CET)
  - Summer (DST): UTC+02:00 (CEST)
- INSEE/Postal code: 77249 /77150
- ^{1} French Land Register data, which excludes lakes, ponds, glaciers > 1 km^{2} (0.386 sq mi or 247 acres) and river estuaries.

Lésigny (French pronunciation: [leziɲi]) is a commune in the Seine-et-Marne département in the Île-de-France region in the south-eastern suburbs of Paris, France. It is 20 km (12 mi) from Paris.

The town is well known for its affluence and for the Château de Grande Romaine, which hosted the Brazil national football team during FIFA World Cup 1998, as well as famous European football teams such as Paris Saint-Germain FC, Olympique de Marseille, AS Monaco FC and Chelsea FC. Since becoming residential, Lésigny has hosted many celebrities. Many movies and advertisements were filmed in Lésigny's Americanized districts.

== Geography ==
Lésigny is 22 km to the east of Paris in the department of Seine-et-Marne. It is a suburban area bordering the forest of Notre-Dame. 267 hectares of the forest's 2200 hectares are in the territory of Lésigny.

== Demographics ==
Historical population

Year	Pop.	±% p.a.
1773	440	—
1793	439	−0.01%
1800	323	−4.29%
1806	297	−1.39%
1821	349	+1.08%
1831	381	+0.88%
1836	368	−0.69%
1841	389	+1.12%
1846	374	−0.78%
1851	394	+1.05%
1856	406	+0.60%
1861	396	−0.50%
1866	398	+0.10%
1872	415	+0.70%
1876	415	+0.00%
1881	405	−0.49%
1886	431	+1.25%
1891	383	−2.33%
1896	418	+1.76%

Year	Pop.	±% p.a.
1901	401	−0.83%
1906	400	−0.05%
1911	350	−2.64%
1921	311	−1.17%
1926	304	−0.45%
1931	260	−3.08%
1936	254	−0.47%
1946	207	−2.03%
1954	339	+6.36%
1962	315	−0.91%
1968	362	+2.34%
1975	6,572	+51.31%
1982	7,114	+1.14%
1990	7,865	+1.26%
1999	7,647	−0.31%
2007	7,553	−0.15%
2012	7,425	−0.34%
2017	7,214	−0.57%
2023	6,923	−0.68%

Source: EHESS (1793-1999) and INSEE (1968-2023)

Inhabitants are called Lésigniens in French.

== Suburban development ==
The suburban development of Lésigny was initiated in 1968 by American real estate developer William Levitt. Two housing projects were established by Levitt, completely separated from the little village of Lésigny: Le Parc de Lésigny (600 detached houses) and L'Orée de Lésigny (276 semi-detached houses). Its American character was augmented by the presence of a private swimming pool and tennis court. Due to this development, the population of the commune sharply increased from 362 in 1968 to 6,572 in 1975.

== Twin towns ==
- Leingarten, Germany, since 1975
- Asola, Italy, since 2004

== See also ==
- Communes of the Seine-et-Marne department
