= William Levitt =

American real estate developer and suburbia pioneer

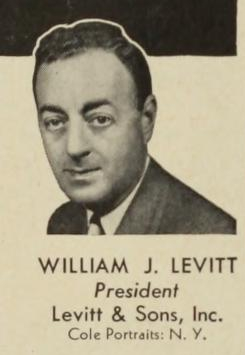
- Levitt, Pictured in 1949
- Born: William Jaird Levitt; February 11, 1907; New York City, US
- Died: January 28, 1994 (aged 86); Manhasset, New York, US
- Education: New York University (no degree)
- Occupation: Real estate developer
- Employer: Levitt & Sons
- Known for: American suburban development
- Spouse(s): Rhoda Kirshner (divorced); Alice D. Kenny (divorced); Simone Korchin
- Children: 7 (including 5 adopted)
- Military career
- Allegiance: United States
- Branch: United States Navy
- Service years: 1942–1945
- Rank: Lieutenant
- Unit: Naval Construction Battalions
- Conflicts: World War II

William Jaird Levitt (February 11, 1907 – January 28, 1994) was an American real-estate developer and housing pioneer. As president of Levitt & Sons, he is widely credited as the father of modern American suburbia. In 1998 he was named one of Time Magazine's "100 Most Influential People of the 20th Century."

== Early life and education ==
Levitt was born in 1907 to a Jewish family in Brooklyn. His generation was the second since emigrating from Russia and Austria; the paternal grandparents who immigrated to the United States had been a rabbi grandfather from Russia and a grandmother from Austria-Hungary. His father was Abraham Levitt, a Brooklyn-born real estate attorney and part-time investor; his mother was Pauline Biederman. A younger brother, Alfred, was born when William was five years old. William received a public school education at Public School 44 and Boys High School. He then attended New York University for three years, but dropped out before graduating.

== Levitt & Sons ==
=== 1920s–1930s ===
In 1929, William's father Abraham founded a real-estate development company called Levitt & Sons. Levitt & Sons built mostly upscale housing on and around Long Island, New York, in the 1930s. William Levitt served as company president, overseeing all aspects of the company except for the designs of the homes they built, which fell to William's brother Alfred.

=== After World War II ===
During World War II, Levitt served in the Navy as a lieutenant in the Seabees. After returning from the war, he saw a need for affordable housing for returning veterans. America's post-war prosperity and baby boom had created a crisis of affordable housing.

Even before returning from the war, Levitt experimented with mass housing projects, building a 1,600-home community in Norfolk, Virginia, which was not a success and housing units remained unsold in 1950.

=== Levittown housing developments ===
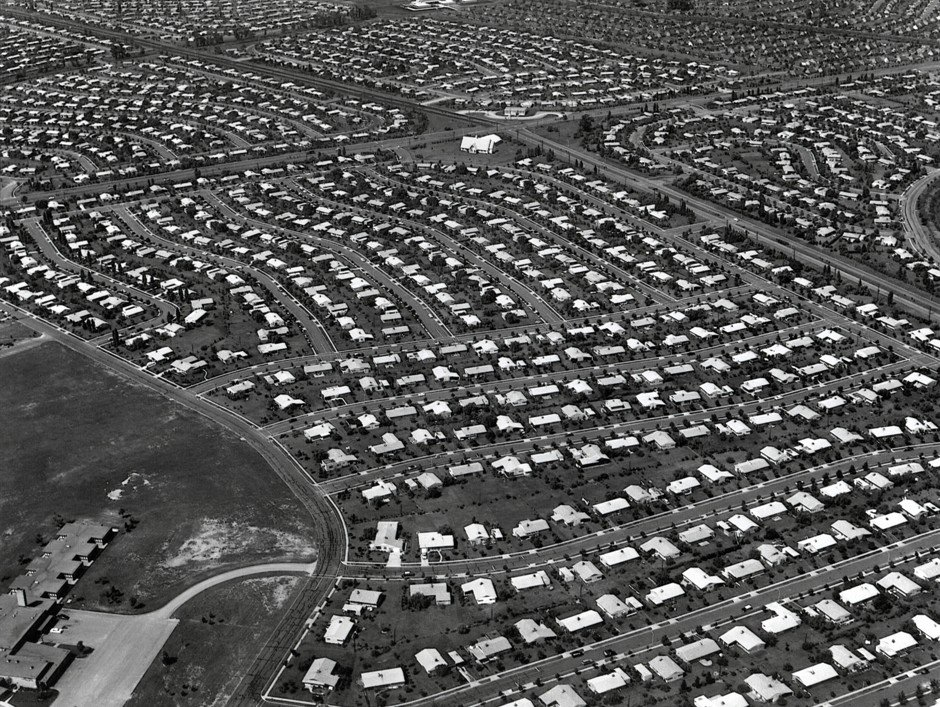
Aerial view circa 1959 of Levittown, Pennsylvania at the intersection of Levittown Pkwy & Mill Creek Pkwy

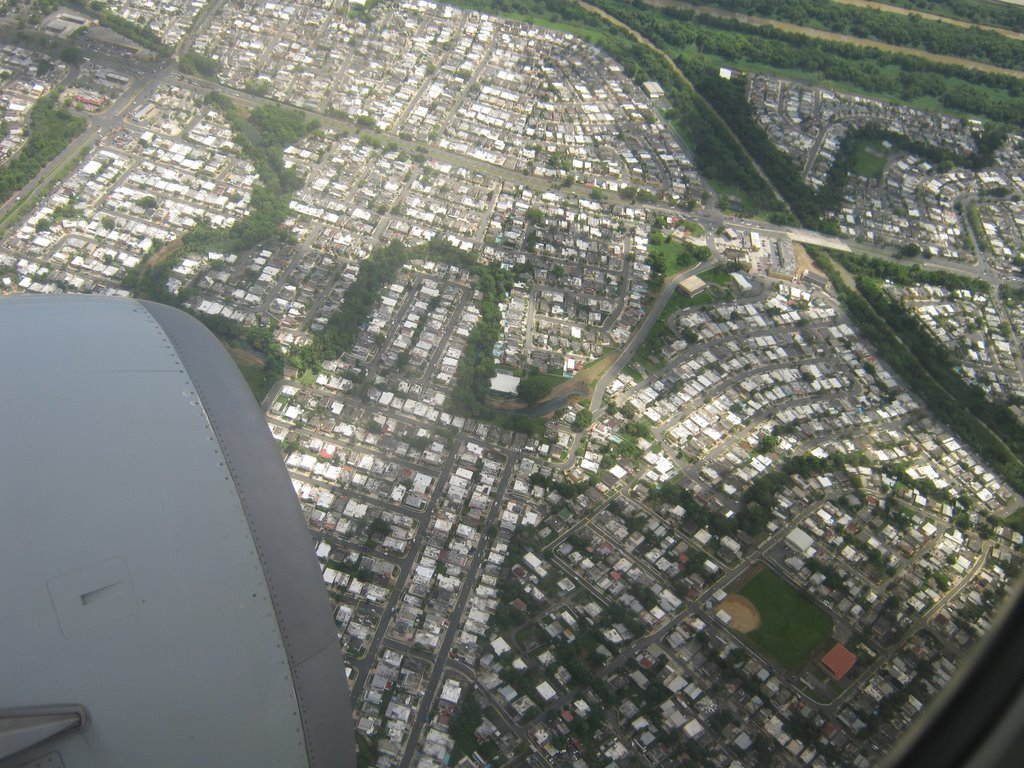
Levittown, Puerto Rico

Levitt progressed to become a pioneer of mass production. He had houses built in less than six weeks on inexpensive land with no urban infrastructure. Houses were built on concrete slabs, with no further foundation, and could be purchased for as little as a one-dollar down payment.

Levitt & Sons' first successful housing development was located on almost 20 square miles (52 km^{2}) of land near Hempstead, Long Island and was named Levittown. The assembly line construction method enabled Levitt to build more efficiently than other developers at the time, with teams of specialized workers following each other from house to house to complete incremental steps in the construction.

Levitt reduced the cost of constructing houses by freezing out union labor. This provoked picket lines, but enabled him to use the latest technology, such as spray painting. Levitt also cut out middlemen and purchased many items, including lumber and televisions, directly from manufacturers, as well as constructing his own factory to produce nails. The building of every house was reduced to 27 steps, and sub-contractors were responsible for each step. His mass production of thousands of houses at virtually the same time allowed Levitt to sell them, fully furnished with modern electric appliances, for as little as $8,000 each ($95,000 in 2024 dollars), which, with the G.I. Bill and Federal housing subsidies, reduced the up-front cost of a house to many buyers to around $400.

Levitt was the cover story in Time magazine for July 3, 1950, with the tag line "For Sale: a new way of life."

In 1952, people started buying over 17,000 Levitt-built homes in Bucks County, Pennsylvania. In addition, the company built Willingboro, New Jersey, which still has street names such as Levitt Parkway. During the late 1950s, Levitt and Sons constructed "Belair at Bowie" in Bowie, Maryland.

William had taken control of Levitt & Sons in 1954 and the company went public in 1960. During the 1960s, when Levitt was leading the company, Levitt & Sons developed properties beyond the American mainland, such as Levittown, Puerto Rico; Lésigny, France in Seine-et-Marne; and Mennecy in Essonne, France. In the early 1960s, the company built a 5,000-house community in north central New Jersey called Strathmore-at-Matawan.

=== Personal fortune ===
By the late 1960s, Levitt had become one of the richest men in America, with a fortune estimated in excess of $100 million (~$1 billion in 2024). He lived in a lavish 30-room mansion on his "La Coline" estate in Mill Neck, New York, and spent much of his time on La Belle Simone, his 237 feet (72 m) yacht named after his third wife.

=== Racial segregation ===
Levitt refused to integrate his developments. The Jewish Levitt barred Jews from Strathmore, his first pre-Levittown development on Long Island in New York, and he refused to sell his homes to African Americans. His sales contracts also forbade the resale of properties to blacks through restrictive covenants, although in 1957 a Jewish couple resold their house to the first black family to live in a Levitt home. Levitt's all-white policies also led to civil rights protests in Bowie, Maryland in 1963. The National Association for the Advancement of Colored People and the American Civil Liberties Union opposed Levitt's racist policies, and the Federal Housing Administration prepared to refuse mortgages on his next Levittown. Nevertheless, Levitt would not back down and continued planning another whites-only Levittown in Willingboro Township, New Jersey. He fought legal challenges in New Jersey courts until the United States Supreme Court refused to hear his case.

=== Company sale ===
After he had built over 140,000 houses around the world, then 60-year-old Levitt sold the company to ITT for $92 million ($890 million today) in July 1967, of which $62 million was in the form of ITT stock. ITT made Levitt president of the renamed Levitt Corp., with a non-compete clause where Levitt could not found or be employed by another United States home building company for ten years. He entered the agreement thinking he would play an active role in ITT affairs, but executives felt Levitt was too old to take on more responsibility.

Levitt remained president under ITT until 1972. During that time he led the subsidiary's development of housing projects in Palm Coast, Florida; Richmond, Virginia; and Fairfax, Virginia.

== Later years and death ==
After the restriction against Levitt moving to a new home building company in the United States expired, he was unable to repeat the success he had achieved with Levitt & Sons. He established a series of companies and joint ventures through the 1970s and 1980s which failed. The ITT stock he often used for collateral on these ventures lost 90% of its value, saddling him with great debt.

The Levitt Corp. had its license to conduct business in Prince George's County, Maryland, revoked in October 1978 after building inspectors found more than 2,500 code violations in 122 homes of their latest subdivision, Northview.

He was accused of misappropriation of funds from the charitable Levitt Foundation and agreed to repay $5 million, more than $5 million or $11 million (in 1992).

Levitt died from kidney disease at a hospital in Manhasset, New York, on January 28, 1994, at the age of 86.

== Legacy ==
William Levitt came to symbolize the new suburban growth with his use of mass-production techniques to construct large developments of houses, eponymously named Levittowns, selling for under $10,000. Many other relatively inexpensive suburban developments soon appeared throughout the country. While he did not invent the building of communities of affordable single-family homes within driving distance of major areas of employment, his innovations in providing affordable housing popularized this type of planned community in the years following World War II.

His nicknames included "The King of Suburbia" and "Inventor of the Suburb." At his height, when he was completing one suburban house every 11 minutes, Levitt compared his successes to those of Henry Ford's automobile assembly line. Time magazine recognized Levitt as one of the "100 Most Important People of the 20th Century" in 1998.

Levitt was awarded the Frank P. Brown Medal in 1965.

== Personal life ==
Levitt married Rhoda Kirshner in November 1929. They had two sons, born in 1932 and 1944. The couple divorced in 1959, and, the same year, Levitt married his long-time mistress, Alice D. Kenny, an interior decorator at Levitt & Sons, and adopted her two daughters from a previous marriage. Ten years later, in 1969, Levitt divorced his second wife and married a French art dealer, Simone Korchin.
