= Suozzi =

Suozzi is a surname. Notable people with the surname include:

- Joseph A. Suozzi (1921–2016), Justice of the New York Supreme Court
- Tom Suozzi (born 1962), Nassau County Executive and U.S. Representative
