= 2022 New York's 3rd congressional district election =

- November 8, 2022
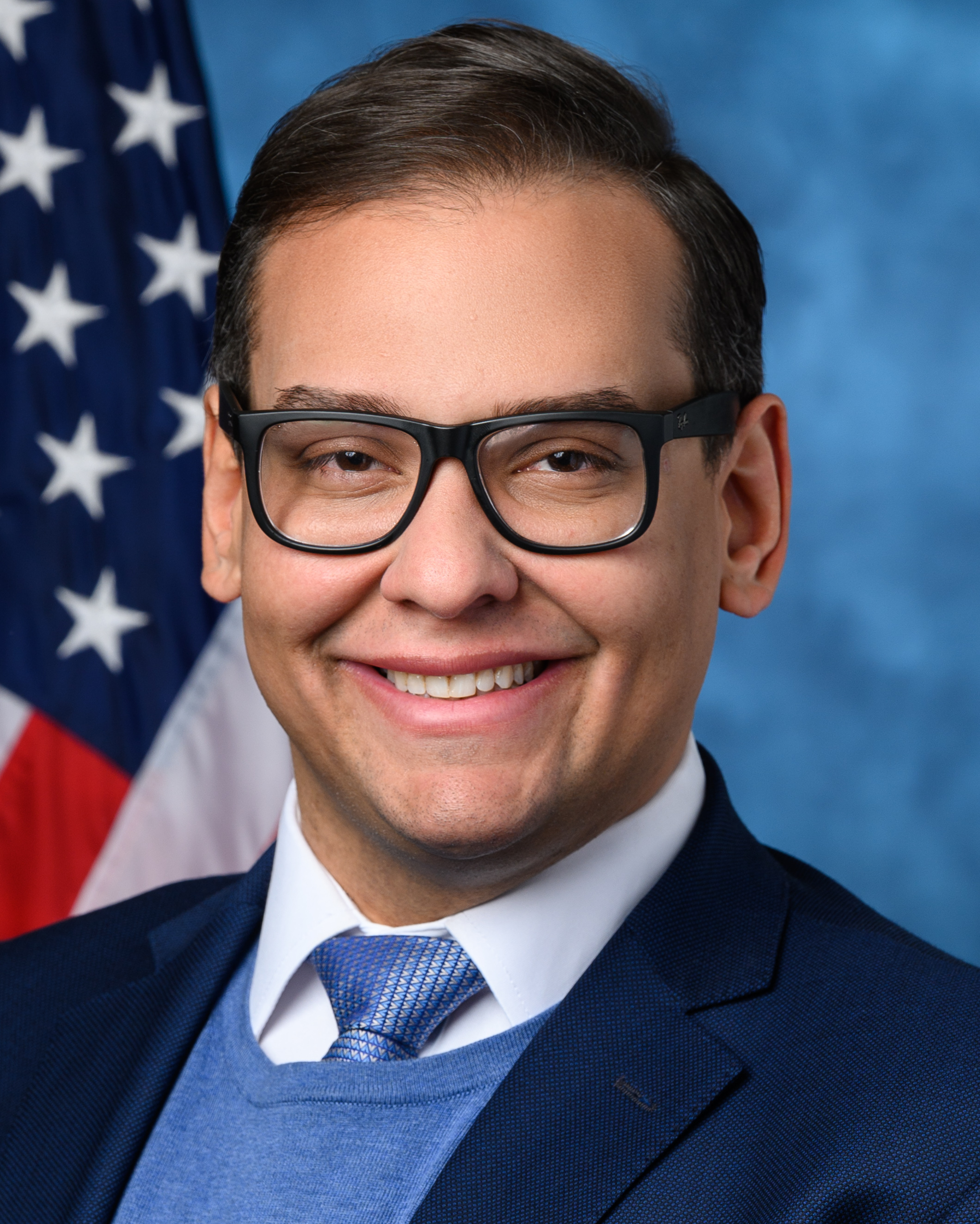

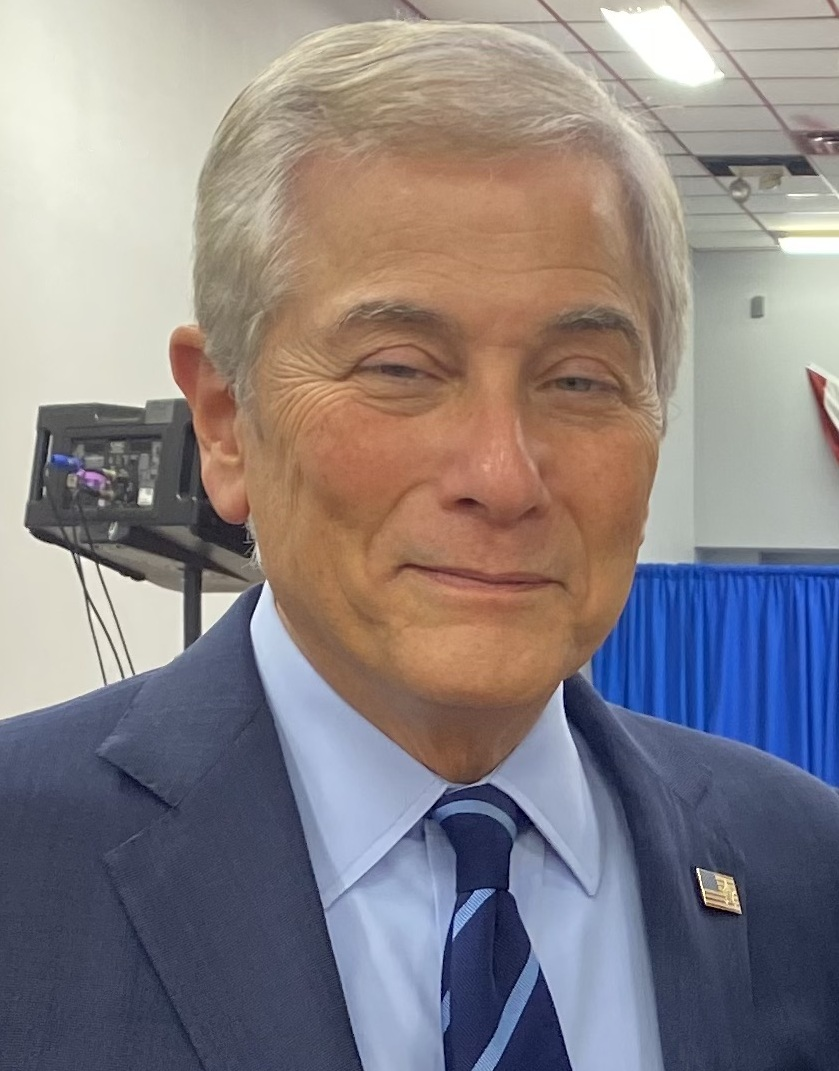
Nominee	George Santos	Robert Zimmerman
Party	Republican	Democratic
Alliance	Conservative	Working Families
Popular vote	145,824	125,404
Percentage	53.76%	46.24%
- Santos: 50–60% 60–70% 70–80% 80–90% >90% Zimmerman: 50–60% 60–70% 70–80% 80–90% Tie: 50% No votes
U.S. Representative before election
Tom Suozzi
Democratic
Elected U.S. Representative
George Santos
Republican

The 2022 New York's 3rd congressional district election was held on November 8, 2022, to elect the United States representative for New York's 3rd congressional district. Primary elections were held on August 23. In November 2021, incumbent Democratic US Representative Tom Suozzi announced he would not seek re-election and instead would run for governor, his 2020 Republican opponent George Santos was elected to succeed him. Santos defeated Democratic nominee Robert Zimmerman 54% to 46%.

== Democratic primary ==
=== Candidates ===
==== Nominee ====
- Robert Zimmerman, Democratic National Committee member and communications professional

==== Eliminated in primary ====
- Melanie D'Arrigo, health care consultant and candidate for this district in 2020
- Jon Kaiman, former North Hempstead supervisor, former chairman of the Nassau Interim Finance Authority, and candidate for this district in 2016
- Josh Lafazan, Nassau County Legislator for the 18th district
- Reema Rasool, candidate for Oyster Bay Town Council in 2021

==== Withdrawn ====
- Alessandra Biaggi, state senator from the 34th district (2019–present) (ran in the 17th district)

==== Declined ====
- Tom Suozzi, incumbent U.S. representative (ran for governor)

==== Endorsements ====
Alessandra Biaggi (withdrawn)

U.S. representatives

- Jamaal Bowman, U.S. representative from New York's 16th congressional district (2021–present)

State legislators

- Jabari Brisport, state senator from the 25th district (2021–present)
- Samra Brouk, state senator from the 55th district (2021–present)
- Jeremy Cooney, state senator from the 56th district (2021–present)
- Andrew Gounardes, state senator from the 22nd district (2019–present)
- Peter Harckham, state senator from the 40th district (2019–present)
- Brad Hoylman, state senator from the 27th district (2013–present)
- Robert Jackson, state senator from the 31st district (2019–present)
- Rachel May, state senator from the 53rd district (2019–present)
- Elijah Reichlin-Melnick, state senator from the 38th district (2021–present)
- Gustavo Rivera, state senator from the 33rd district (2011–present)
- Julia Salazar, state senator from the 18th district (2019–present)
- James Skoufis, state senator from the 39th district (2019–present)

Local officials

- Brad Lander, New York City Comptroller (2022–present)
- David Tubiolo, Westchester County legislator (2016–present)
Melanie D'Arrigo

Local officials

- Melissa Mark-Viverito, former Speaker of the New York City Council (2014–2017) from the 8th district (2006–2017)

Individuals

- Nomiki Konst, political commentator

Organizations

- Brand New Congress
- Everytown for Gun Safety Action Fund
- Friends of the Earth Action
- Indivisible
- National Organization for Women
- New York Communities for Change
- New York Working Families Party
- One Fair Wage
- Our Revolution

Labor unions

- Committee of Interns and Residents
- SEIU New York, New Jersey, and Connecticut branch
- United Auto Workers
Jon Kaiman

County officials

- Steve Bellone, Suffolk County Executive (2012–present)

Local officials

- Daneek Miller, former New York City councilor (2014–2021)

Labor unions

- Amalgamated Transit Union Locals 1056 and 1179
Josh Lafazan

U.S. representatives

- Thomas Suozzi, U.S. representative from New York's 3rd congressional district (2017–2023)
Robert Zimmerman

Federal officials

- Hillary Clinton, United States Secretary of State (2009–2013), U.S. Senator from New York (2001–2009), First Lady of the United States (1993–2001)

U.S. representatives

- Gary Ackerman, former U.S. representative from New York's 7th congressional district (1983–2013)
- Steve Israel, former U.S. representative from New York's 3rd congressional district (2001–2017)
- Carolyn Maloney, former U.S. representative from New York's 12th congressional district (1993–2023)
- Gregory Meeks, U.S. representative from New York's 5th congressional district (1998–present)
- Grace Meng, U.S. representative from New York's 6th congressional district (2013–present)
- Ritchie Torres, U.S. representative from New York's 15th congressional district (2021–present)

Statewide officials

- Thomas DiNapoli, New York State Comptroller (2007–present)

State legislators

- Charles Lavine, state assemblymember from the 13th district (2005–present)

Local officials

- Laura Curran, former Nassau County Executive (2018–2021)
- Ruben Diaz Jr., former Bronx Borough President (2009–2021)
- Corey Johnson, former Speaker of the New York City Council (2018–2021) from the 3rd district (2014–2021)
- Christine Quinn, former Speaker of the New York City Council (2006–2013) from the 3rd district (1999–2013)

Individuals

- Hazel Nell Dukes, former president of the NAACP

Organizations

- League of Conservation Voters
- LGBTQ Victory Fund
- Sierra Club
- Stonewall Democratic Club of New York City

Labor unions

- American Federation of Government Employees District 2
- International Union of Painters and Allied Trades
- National Postal Mail Handlers Union Local 300
- New York State AFL-CIO
- New York State United Teachers
- Retail, Wholesale and Department Store Union
- United Food and Commercial Workers Local 1500

==== Polling ====
Poll source	Date(s) administered	Sample size (Note: Key: A – all adults RV – registered voters LV – likely voters V – unclear)	Margin of error	Melanie D'Arrigo	Jon Kaiman	Josh Lafazan	Reema Rasool	Robert Zimmerman	Undecided
Global Strategy Group (D) (Note: Poll sponsored by Zimmerman's campaign)	July 20–24, 2022	400 (LV)	–	12%	13%	10%	1%	17%	48%
The Mellman Group (D) (Note: Poll sponsored by Lafazan's campaign)	June 12–16, 2022	400 (LV)	–	4%	20%	20%	4%	10%	43%

==== Primary results ====
Democratic primary results
Party	Candidate	Votes	%
Democratic	Robert Zimmerman	9,482	35.8
Democratic	Jon Kaiman	6,884	26.0
Democratic	Josh Lafazan	5,296	20.0
Democratic	Melanie D'Arrigo	4,197	15.8
Democratic	Reema Rasool	661	2.5
Total votes		26,520	100.0

== Republican primary ==
=== Candidates ===
==== Nominee ====
- George Santos, former call center employee and nominee for this district in 2020

==== Endorsements ====
George Santos

Organizations

- New York Young Republican Club

== General election ==
=== Predictions ===
Source	Ranking	As of
The Cook Political Report	Tossup	November 1, 2022
Inside Elections	Tilt D	October 21, 2022
Sabato's Crystal Ball	Lean R (flip)	November 7, 2022
Politico	Lean D	May 27, 2022
RCP	Tossup	June 9, 2022
Fox News	Tossup	July 11, 2022
DDHQ	Lean D	August 10, 2022
FiveThirtyEight	Lean D	September 30, 2022
The Economist	Lean D	September 28, 2022

=== Polling ===
Poll source	Date(s) administered	Sample size	Margin of error	Robert Zimmerman (D)	George Santos (R)	Other	Undecided
RMG Research	August 27 – September 2, 2022	400 (LV)	± 4.9%	42%	41%	4%	14%

Hypothetical polling

Josh Lafazan vs. George Santos vs. Melanie D'Arrigo

Poll source	Date(s) administered	Sample size	Margin of error	Josh Lafazan (D)	George Santos (R)	Melanie D'Arrigo (WFP)	Undecided
co/efficient (R) (Note: Poll sponsored by Santos's campaign)	July 11–12, 2022	714 (LV)	± 3.7%	33%	44%	8%	15%

=== Endorsements ===
George Santos

Organizations

- New York Young Republican Club

Local Officials

- Robert F. Holden, Member of the New York City Council from the 30th district (2018–Present) (Democrat)

=== Results ===
2022 New York's 3rd congressional district election
Party	Candidate	Votes	%	±%
Republican	George Santos	133,859	49.35%	+9.78
Conservative	George Santos	11,965	4.41%	+0.53
Total	George Santos	145,824	53.76%	+10.31
Democratic	Robert Zimmerman	120,045	44.26%	−8.35
Working Families	Robert Zimmerman	5,359	1.98%	−0.49
Total	Robert Zimmerman	125,404	46.24%	−9.73
Total votes		271,228	100.00%	
Republican gain from Democratic				

== Aftermath ==
In the wake of the disclosures about Santos after the election, Democratic Party officials and journalists asked whether Santos would have been elected had voters known about his misrepresentations. FiveThirtyEight noted that Santos's margin of victory was lower than Republicans running statewide who had carried the district—7.5 percent compared to Zeldin's 12 percent, for instance; Republican U.S. Senate candidate Joe Pinion carried the district by a 4 percent margin despite being vastly outspent by his victorious opponent, incumbent Senate majority leader Charles Schumer. The site's calculations suggest that scandals usually reduce an incumbent congressional candidate's margins by 9 percent, but there are so many other variables in elections that it cannot be assumed Santos would have lost just on that basis; sometimes candidates have actually done better than expected after a scandal, and scandal may have less effect in a time of hyperpartisan political identification.

Newsday found that Santos had also benefited from higher-than-usual Republican turnout on Long Island resulting from Zeldin's gubernatorial bid (Zeldin received 47 percent of the vote, the best performance in the state by a Republican candidate for governor since George Pataki in 2002), with 64 percent of the party's voters, 12 percent more than usual, showing up at the polls. "This was not about George Santos", Nassau County Republican chairman Joe Cairo told the paper, noting that Republican candidates, flipped seats in the state legislature in both Nassau and Suffolk counties as well as the congressional seats. "This was a Republican year. Any Republican would have won that district."

Had the state legislature's original redistricting plan been in place at the time of the election, Newsday found, it was likely that the Democratic candidate would have won the 3rd district. That plan, ruled unconstitutional by the state's Court of Appeals, its highest, would have combined the core of the old district on the North Shore and in neighboring Queens with heavily Democratic portions of Westchester County along the north coast of Long Island Sound. That potential district had voted for Biden in 2020 by a 57 percent margin, while the eventual 3rd district had done so by 54 percent, one percent less than the 2020 3rd district. Yet Democrats actually gained about 7,000 voters registered to them from the redistricting.

Cairo discounted the effect of the redistricting. His Democratic counterpart, Jay Jacobs (also the state party chair), agreed. Adding Massapequa to the district at the expense of Huntington had cost "maybe a couple of thousand votes" out of the 20,000 Santos won by. "What did this was the overriding message problem we had on crime and bail reform, the fever pitch those were at in the New York suburbs", Jacobs said. "Santos didn't get elected based on his outstanding resume and he didn't get elected because of redistricting. He got elected because the political environment in New York State favored the Republican messaging." His election made him the first LGBT non-incumbent Republican elected to federal office.

=== Criminal investigation and expulsion ===
On December 19, 2022, the New York Times found Republican candidate George Santos might have misrepresented his resume. On December 26, in an interview, Santos admitted to lying about his resume but stated he still intends to serve in Congress. The next day, the Republican Jewish Coalition condemned Santos for misrepresenting his heritage. On January 31, 2023, amid outcry from his fabrication of his personal life, and amidst questions about his campaign finances, Santos withdrew from his committee assignments.

On May 10, the United States District Court for the Eastern District of New York indicted Santos on seven counts of wire fraud, three counts of money laundering, two counts of making materially false statements to the House and one count of theft of public funds. On October 10, Santos's previous indictment was replaced with one of 23 various counts, including charging $44,000 of cards from contributors of his campaign without their knowledge.

On November 1, a vote to expel Santos from the house failed 179–213. However, on November 16, the Ethics Committee released a report on Santos that found significant evidence of wrongdoing, finding he exploited his House campaign for his own benefit. On December 1, Santos was expelled in a 311–114 vote. As a result, a special election was held on February 13, 2024, to fill the vacancy, resulting in Santos' Democratic predecessor Tom Suozzi reclaiming his former seat.

== Notes ==
Partisan clients
