= 2024 New York's 3rd congressional district special election =

- February 13, 2024

New York's 3rd congressional district
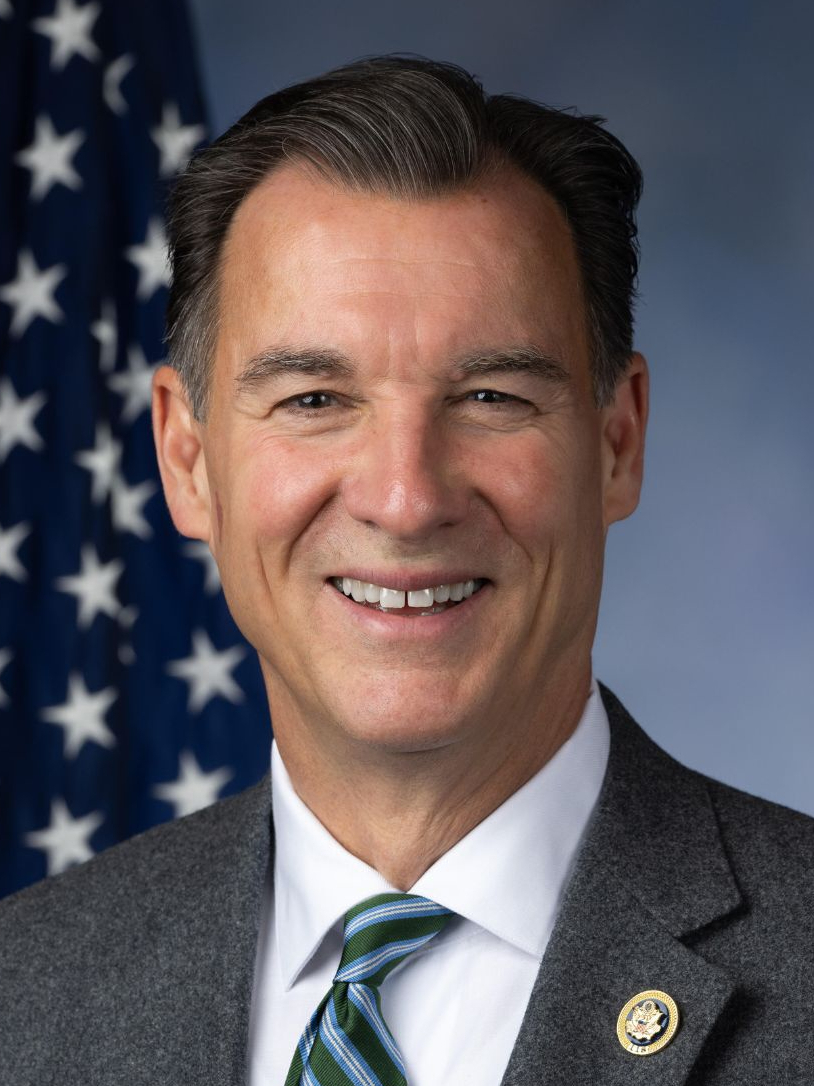

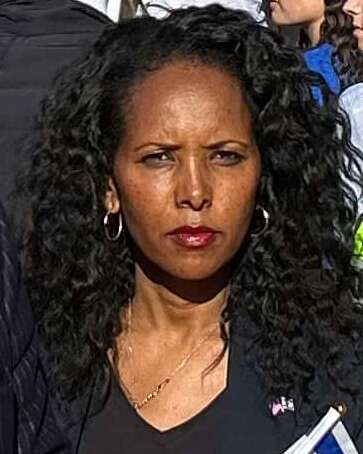
Nominee	Tom Suozzi	Mazi Melesa Pilip
Party	Democratic	Republican
Alliance		Conservative
Popular vote	93,183	79,290
Percentage	53.92%	45.88%
- Suozzi: 50–60% 60–70% 70–80% 80–90% >90% Pilip: 50–60% 60–70% 70–80% 80–90% >90% Tie: 40–50% 50% No votes
U.S. Representative before election
George Santos
Republican
Elected U.S. Representative
Tom Suozzi
Democratic

The 2024 New York's 3rd congressional district special election was held on February 13, 2024, to fill the vacant seat in New York's 3rd congressional district for the remainder of the 118th United States Congress. The seat became vacant after the expulsion of Republican George Santos on December 1, 2023. Considered a suburban swing seat, political analysts predicted a competitive and expensive election for both parties. The early voting period ran from February 3 to February 11, 2024.

Republicans nominated Nassau County legislator Mazi Melesa Pilip, while Democrats nominated Tom Suozzi, the former U.S. representative for this district and Santos's predecessor. Suozzi defeated Pilip, reclaiming the seat for Democrats. This was the first time that a New York congressional seat changed parties in a special election since 2011.

== Background ==
Republican George Santos was elected to Congress in 2022 from New York's 3rd district. Weeks later, The New York Times reported that he had misrepresented his background during the campaign. Santos confirmed the allegations against him were true soon after, but refused to resign from his seat. After a formal inquiry by the House Ethics Committee, he was expelled from the House of Representatives on December 1, 2023, by a vote of 311 to 114. At the time of the expulsion, he was indicted on 23 federal charges related to fraud. Santos was the first representative to be expelled in two decades and the first since the Civil War to be expelled before any criminal conviction.

== Nominees ==
New York does not use primary elections when filling vacancies. Instead, party officials in the affected counties (in this case, Nassau and Queens) are responsible for choosing nominees.

=== Democratic Party ===
Democrats selected Tom Suozzi as the party's nominee on December 7, 2023. He had previously represented the district in the House from 2017 to 2023. Before that, he served as the Nassau County executive and the mayor of Glen Cove, and had run for governor in 2006 and 2022.

=== Republican Party ===
On December 14, 2023, Republicans selected Mazi Melesa Pilip as their nominee to replace Santos. She previously served in the Israel Defense Forces, and has represented the 10th legislative district in the Nassau County Legislature since 2022. She was a registered Democrat who held office as a Republican.

=== Minor parties ===
New York allows fusion voting in elections, prompting minor parties to nominate candidates on their ballot lines. The Conservative Party of New York State nominated Pilip. Suozzi declined to seek the support of the Working Families Party, despite having accepted the party's nomination in past election cycles.

== General election ==
=== Predictions ===
Source	Ranking	As of
The Cook Political Report	Tossup	January 23, 2024
Inside Elections	Tossup	February 9, 2024
Sabato's Crystal Ball	Tossup	February 7, 2024
Elections Daily	Lean D (flip)	February 5, 2024
CNalysis	Lean D (flip)	February 12, 2024

=== Endorsements ===
Mazi Melesa Pilip (R)

U.S. senators

- Al D'Amato, former U.S. senator from New York (1981–1999)

U.S. representatives

- Anthony D'Esposito, U.S. representative for NY 4 (2023–present)
- Tom Emmer, U.S. representative for MN 6 (2015–present) and House majority whip (2023–present)
- Andrew Garbarino, U.S. representative for NY 2 (2021–present)
- Richard Hudson, U.S. representative for NC 9 (2013–present)
- Peter King, former U.S. representative for NY 2 (1993–2021)
- Nick LaLota, U.S. representative for NY 1 (2023–present)
- Mike Lawler, U.S. representative for NY 17 (2023–present)
- Nicole Malliotakis, U.S. representative for NY 11 (2021–present)
- Marc Molinaro, U.S. representative for NY 19 (2023–present)
- Elise Stefanik, U.S. representative for NY 21 (2015–present) and House Republican Conference chair (2021–present)

State legislators

- Ari Brown, state assemblyman for the 20th district (2022–present)

Local officials

- Bruce Blakeman, Nassau County executive (2022–present)

Labor unions

- Nassau County Correction Officers' Benevolent Association
- Nassau and Suffolk County Police Benevolent Associations
- National Border Patrol Council
- Sergeants Benevolent Association

Organizations

- Maggie's List
- NORPAC
- Republican Jewish Coalition

Newspapers

- Five Towns Jewish Times
- The Jewish Press
- New York Post

Political parties

- Conservative Party of New York State
- New York Republican Party
Tom Suozzi (D)

U.S. senators

- Doug Jones, former U.S. senator from Alabama (2018–2021)

U.S representatives

- Suzan DelBene, U.S. representative for WA 1 (2012–present)
- Gabby Giffords, former U.S. representative for AZ 8 (2007–2012)
- Hakeem Jeffries, U.S. representative for NY 8 (2013–present) and House minority leader (2023–present)
- Ron Klein, former U.S. representative for FL 22 (2007–2011)
- Raja Krishnamoorthi, U.S. representative for IL 8 (2017–present)
- Annie Kuster, U.S. representative for NH 2 (2013–present)
- Ted Lieu, U.S. representative for CA 36 (2015–present) and House Democratic Caucus vice chair (2023–present)
- Gregory Meeks, U.S. representative for NY 5 (1998–present)
- Grace Meng, U.S. representative for NY 6 (2013–present)
- Pat Ryan, U.S. representative for NY 18 (2022–present)
- Linda Sánchez, U.S. representative for CA 38 (2003–present)
- Abigail Spanberger, U.S. representative for VA 7 (2019–present) and 2025 candidate for governor of Virginia

State governors

- Kathy Hochul, governor of New York (2021–present)

State legislators

- Anna Kaplan, former state senator for the 7th district (2019–2022)

Local officials

- Josh Lafazan, former Nassau County legislator for the 18th district (2018–2023)

Individuals

- Mark Mellman, political consultant
- Kelley Robinson, community activist and organizer
- Mini Timmaraju, reproductive rights activist

Labor unions

- 1199SEIU United Healthcare Workers East
- Amalgamated Transit Union Local 1056
- Brotherhood of Railroad Signalmen
- Civil Service Employees Association Local 1000
- Communications Workers of America District 1
- Enterprise Association of Steamfitters Local 638
- International Alliance of Theatrical Stage Employees Local One
- International Association of Sheet Metal, Air, Rail and Transportation Workers
- International Brotherhood of Electrical Workers Locals 3 and 1049
- N.Y.C. District Council of Carpenters
- National Postal Mail Handlers Union Local 300
- New York City and State Building and Construction Trades Councils
- New York State AFL-CIO
- New York State Laborers
- New York State Nurses Association
- New York State United Teachers
- Public Employees Federation
- Retail, Wholesale and Department Store Union Local 338
- SEIU 32BJ
- Transport Workers Union of America Local 100
- Transportation Communications International Union
- United Association Plumbers Local One
- United Auto Workers Region 9A
- United Federation of Teachers
- United Food and Commercial Workers Local 338

Organizations

- Alliance for Retired Americans
- ASPIRE PAC
- Brady PAC
- CHC BOLD PAC
- College Democrats of America
- Democratic Congressional Campaign Committee
- Democratic Majority for Israel
- End Citizens United
- Giffords
- Harvard College Democrats
- High School Democrats of America
- Human Rights Campaign
- Indivisible
- Jewish Democratic Council of America
- League of Conservation Voters
- Moms Demand Action
- Natural Resources Defense Council
- NewDem Action Fund
- Planned Parenthood
- Reproductive Freedom for All
- Sierra Club
- Swing Left
- Young Democrats of America

Newspapers

- New York Daily News
- Newsday

Political parties

- New York Democratic Party
Declined to endorse

U.S. executive branch officials

- Donald Trump, president of the United States (2017–2021) (Republican)

Organizations

- AIPAC

=== Debate ===
2024 New York's 3rd congressional district special election debates
No.	Date	Host	Moderator	Links	Republican	Democratic
P Participant A Absent N Non-invitee I Invitee W Withdrawn						
P Participant A Absent N Non-invitee I Invitee W Withdrawn					Mazi Melesa Pilip	Tom Suozzi
1	February 8, 2024	News 12 Long Island	Rich Barrabi	YouTube	P	P

News 12 Long Island hosted a debate between Suozzi and Pilip on February 8, 2024. Suozzi's campaign had proposed additional debates to be hosted by WABC-TV, WNBC, and NY1. However, Pilip declined to participate in any of them, telling The Jewish Star that she did not have much time for debates given the short campaign schedule.

=== Fundraising ===
Campaign finance reports as of December 31, 2023
Candidate	Raised	Spent	Cash on hand
Mazi Pilip (R)	$1,342,835	$714,273	$628,561
Tom Suozzi (D)	$4,514,693	$2,360,689	$2,217,239
Source: Federal Election Commission

=== Polling ===
Poll source	Date(s) administered	Sample size (Note: Key: A – all adults RV – registered voters LV – likely voters VLV – very likely voters AV – already voted V – unclear)	Margin of error	Mazi Melesa Pilip (R)	Tom Suozzi (D)	Undecided
JL Partners (Note: Poll sponsored by the New York Post)	February 10–12, 2024	500 (LV)	± 4.4%	45%	46%	9%
Siena College (Note: Poll sponsored by Newsday)	February 3–6, 2024	694 (LV)	± 4.2%	44%	48%	7%
Emerson College (Note: Poll sponsored by Nexstar Media Group)	February 4–5, 2024	742 (VLV/AV)	± 3.5%	47%	50%	3%
Emerson College	February 4–5, 2024	742 (VLV/AV)	± 3.5%	48%	52%	–
Emerson College	January 13–15, 2024	975 (RV)	± 3.1%	42%	45%	9%
Opinion Diagnostics (R) (Note: Poll sponsored by Curry's campaign)	November 30, 2023	900 (LV)	± 3.3%	40%	43%	17%

Hypothetical polling

Kellen Curry vs. Tom Suozzi

Poll source	Date(s) administered	Sample size	Margin of error	Kellen Curry (R)	Tom Suozzi (D)	Undecided
Opinion Diagnostics (R)	November 30, 2023	900 (LV)	± 3.3%	39%	43%	18%

Mike Sapraicone vs. Tom Suozzi

Poll source	Date(s) administered	Sample size	Margin of error	Mike Sapraicone (R)	Tom Suozzi (D)	Undecided
Opinion Diagnostics (R)	November 30, 2023	900 (LV)	± 3.3%	38%	45%	17%

=== Results ===
Ultimately, Tom Suozzi won the special election by 8%. The race further narrowed the already slim advantage Republicans had in the United States House of Representatives. Some believed that a winter storm might have helped Suozzi, since Suozzi did better in the early votes and Pilip did better on Election Day.

2024 New York's 3rd congressional district special election
Party	Candidate	Votes	%	±%
Democratic	Tom Suozzi	93,183	53.92	+9.66
Republican	Mazi Melesa Pilip	69,778	40.38	−8.97
Conservative	Mazi Melesa Pilip	9,512	5.50	+1.09
Total	Mazi Melesa Pilip	79,290	45.88	−7.88
Write-in		337	0.20	N/A
Total votes		172,810	100.00	
Democratic gain from Republican				

By county

County	Suozzi Democratic		Pilip Republican		Write-in		Margin		Total votes
County	#	%	#	%	#	%	#	%	Total votes
Nassau (part)	77,575	52.61	69,610	47.21	256	0.18	7,965	5.40	147,441
Queens (part)	15,608	61.52	9,680	38.16	81	0.32	5,928	23.37	25,369
Total	93,183	53.92	79,290	45.88	337	0.20	13,893	8.04	172,810

== Notes ==
Partisan clients
