= Ruvo =

Ruvo may refer to the following places in Italy:

- Ruvo del Monte, Potenza, Basilicata
- Ruvo di Puglia, Bari, Apulia
