= Mary Ann Holzkamp =

American mayor

Mary Ann Holzkamp was the Democratic mayor of Glen Cove, New York, from 2002 to 2005. She was defeated by third-party candidate Ralph V. Suozzi in the 2005 mayoral election. She was the city's first female mayor.

Political offices
Preceded by Tom Suozzi	Mayor of Glen Cove, New York; 2002–2005	Succeeded by Ralph V. Suozzi
