= Joseph A. Suozzi =

Italian-American judge (1921–2016)

Associate Justice of the Appellate Division Second Department
- In office 1976–1980
- Appointed by: Hugh Carey

Justice of the New York Supreme Court
- In office 1962–1976

Mayor of Glen Cove
- In office January 1, 1956 – 1960
- Preceded by: Joseph A. Stanco
- Succeeded by: Patrick J. Kenney

City Court Judge of Glen Cove
- In office January 1950 – September 1955

Personal details
- Born: Giuseppe Antonio Suozzi; August 22, 1921 Ruvo del Monte, Kingdom of Italy
- Died: October 16, 2016 (aged 95)
- Spouse: Marguerite Holmes
- Children: 5, including Tom
- Education: Harvard Law School (JD)

Military service
- Branch/service: United States Army Air Forces
- Unit: Fifteenth Air Force
- Battles/wars: World War II
- Awards: Distinguished Flying Crosses

Joseph Anthony Suozzi (né Giuseppe Antonio Suozzi; August 22, 1921 – October 16, 2016) was an Italian-American attorney, jurist, and politician.

== Early life ==
Suozzi's father, Michele, had arrived in the United States in 1913, served in the U.S. infantry and became a naturalized U.S. citizen. He returned to Italy in 1920 and married Joseph's mother Rosa Ciampa there.

Joseph Suozzi was born in Ruvo del Monte in the Province of Potenza in the Basilicata region. He was a natural-born U.S. citizen by derivation, because his father had already naturalized. He and his mother emigrated to the United States in 1925.

He attended elementary and high school in Glen Cove and Oyster Bay in New York. He volunteered as an Air Cadet prior to his graduation from college. He entered military service with the United States Air Force during World War II, and became a navigator assigned to a B-24 bombing crew of the 15th Air Force. He was based at Torretta Air Field, in Cerignola, Italy – less than 50 miles from his birthplace. He completed 35 bombing missions in Austria, Yugoslavia, Germany, and Italy, for which he was awarded the Distinguished Flying Cross and the Air Medal with three Clusters.

He attended Harvard Law School.

== Career ==
Suozzi was admitted to the practice of law in the State of New York, where he joined with Glen Cove Mayor Luke Mercadante as a law partner, with an office in Glen Cove. The law firm became Mercadante, Suozzi, and Sordi, with the addition of Nicholas A. Sordi, and later Suozzi & Sordi, until Suozzi's election to the New York Supreme Court in 1960.

Suozzi was elected to the bench of the City Court of Glen Cove in 1949, and re-elected in 1953. At the age of 28, the New York Times said that he was the youngest elected or appointed judge in the United States.

He resigned in September 1955, to become a candidate for mayor of Glen Cove and supervisor of the County of Nassau. He served as mayor from 1956 until 1960.

In 1961 he was elected to a fourteen-year term as a justice of the Supreme Court of the State of New York, the state's trial court. He was re-elected in 1974 for another term, with bipartisan support. In 1976, Governor Hugh Carey appointed him associate justice of the Appellate Division, Second Department.

In 1980, he left that bench and resumed the general practice of law as a senior partner in the law firm of Meyer, Suozzi, English & Klein, P.C., a Garden City, New York-based law firm.

== Personal life ==
Suozzi and his wife, Marguerite, had five children. He is the father of U.S. Representative Tom Suozzi, who represents the New York's 3rd congressional district, and who was previously mayor of Glen Cove and was Nassau County Executive from 2002 to 2009.

Suozzi died on October 16, 2016, at age 95.
