= Tom Suozzi =

American politician (born 1962)

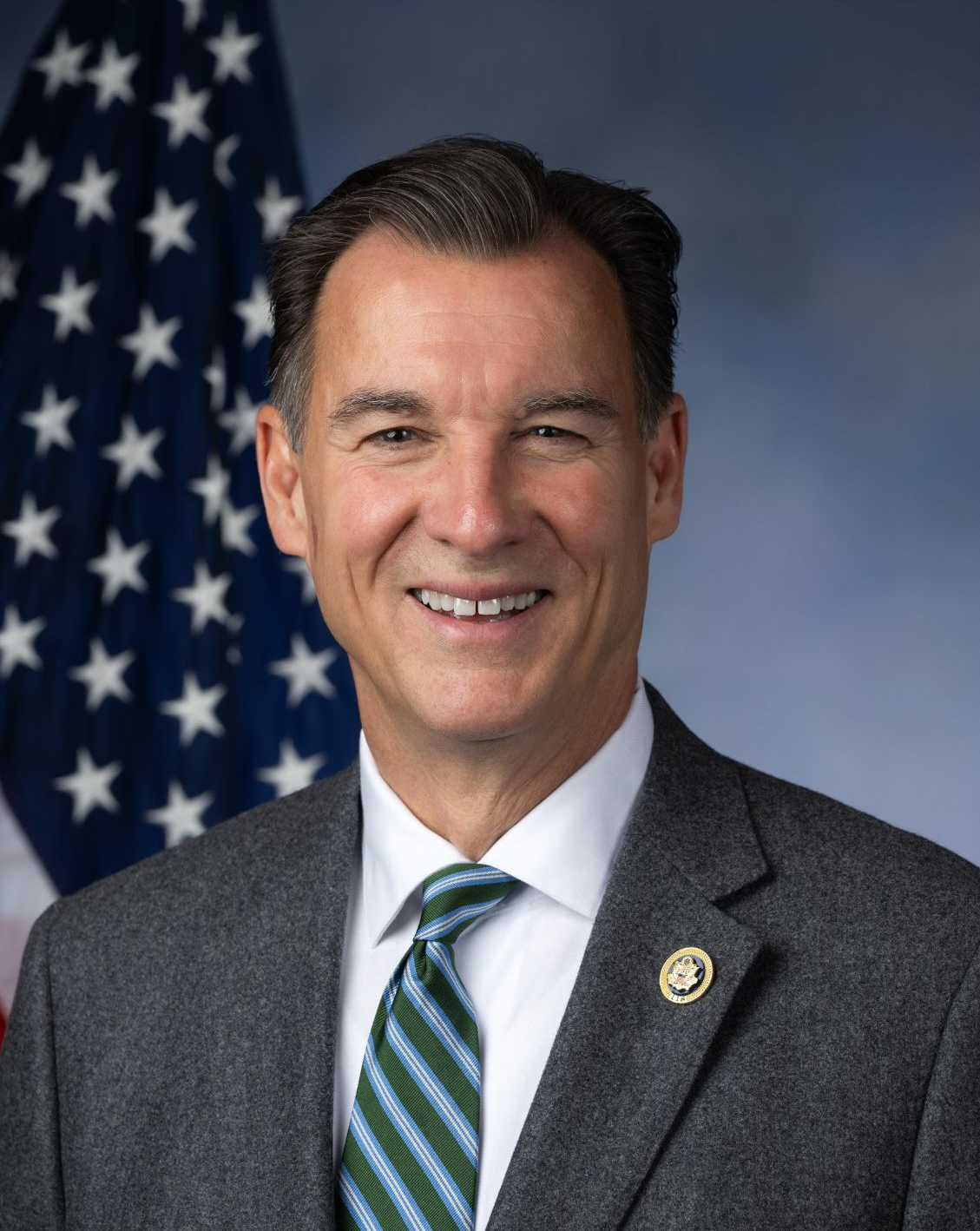
- Official portrait, 2024

Member of the U.S. House of Representatives from New York's 3rd district
- Incumbent
- Assumed office February 13, 2024 (Note: Suozzi's official service begins on the date of the special election, while he was not sworn in until February 28, 2024.)
- Preceded by: George Santos
- In office January 3, 2017 – January 3, 2023
- Preceded by: Steve Israel
- Succeeded by: George Santos

7th County Executive of Nassau County
- In office January 1, 2002 – December 30, 2009
- Preceded by: Thomas Gulotta
- Succeeded by: Ed Mangano

Mayor of Glen Cove
- In office January 1, 1994 – December 31, 2001
- Preceded by: Donald DeRiggi
- Succeeded by: Mary Ann Holzkamp

Personal details
- Born: Thomas Richard Suozzi; August 31, 1962 (age 64) Glen Cove, New York, U.S.
- Party: Democratic
- Spouse: Helene Wrotniak (m. 1993)
- Children: 3
- Relatives: Joseph A. Suozzi (father)
- Education: Boston College (BS); Fordham University (JD)
- Website: House website; Campaign website
- Suozzi's voice Suozzi recognizing victims of the Iran hostage crisis. Recorded December 6, 2022

Thomas Richard Suozzi (/ˈswɒzi/ SWOZ-ee; born August 31, 1962) is an American politician serving as the U.S. representative for New York's 3rd congressional district since 2024 and previously from 2017 to 2023. A member of the Democratic Party, he was the county executive of Nassau County on Long Island from 2002 to 2009 and served before then as the mayor of Glen Cove for eight years. His district, which is largely suburban, includes northern Nassau County and parts of northeastern Queens.

In 2006, he ran unsuccessfully against Eliot Spitzer for the Democratic nomination for governor of New York. Suozzi was elected to the U.S. House of Representatives in 2016 and reelected in 2018 and 2020. He retired from Congress to run again for the Democratic gubernatorial nomination in 2022, losing to incumbent governor Kathy Hochul.

In October 2023, Suozzi announced that he would run for his old congressional seat in 2024. After Congress expelled George Santos that December, a special election to fill the remainder of the term was scheduled for February 13, 2024. Suozzi was selected as the Democratic nominee, and then won the special election, reclaiming the seat for Democrats.

== Early life and education ==
Suozzi was born on August 31, 1962, in Glen Cove, New York, the youngest of five siblings. His father, Joseph A. Suozzi, was an attorney and served as Glen Cove's mayor from 1956 to 1960. Originally from Ruvo del Monte, Italy, Joseph immigrated to the United States as a child. Suozzi's mother, Marguerite (née Holmes), was of Irish and English descent and worked as an operating room nurse at Glen Cove Hospital.

Suozzi graduated from Chaminade High School in 1980 before attending Boston College, where he earned a Bachelor of Science degree in accounting in 1984. After working as a certified public accountant for two years, he pursued a legal career, and earned a Juris Doctor degree from Fordham University School of Law in 1989.

== Professional career ==
Suozzi began his career as an accountant at Arthur Andersen before attending law school. He then served as a law clerk for Thomas Collier Platt Jr. of the U.S. District Court for the Eastern District of New York. Following his clerkship, he worked as a commercial litigator at Shearman & Sterling until 1993.

After being in public office, Suozzi worked in the private sector as an attorney of counsel at Harris Beach and as a consultant for Cablevision and Lazard until 2016. Later after leaving Congress, he joined Actum as a co-chair in 2023.

Following the 2026 House of Representatives Primaries in New York, where all three Democratic Socialists of America (DSA) endorsed candidates won their races, Suozzi launched an anti-socialist, pro-capitalism initiative called the "Promise to America" in order to oppose DSA candidates in the Democratic Party.

== Early political career ==
=== Mayor of Glen Cove ===
In 1993, Suozzi was elected mayor of Glen Cove, New York. He served as mayor for four terms. His father, Joseph A. Suozzi, his uncle, Vincent Suozzi, and cousin, Ralph were also mayors of Glen Cove. Joseph served from 1956 to 1960, Vincent served from 1984 to 1987 and Ralph served from 2006 to 2013.

As mayor, Suozzi focused on environmental cleanup of commercial and industrial sites, and redeveloping brownfield and superfund sites. In 1994, the Glen Cove incinerator was permanently closed and dismantled. In 1998, the city demolished and redeveloped the defunct Li Tungsten Refinery grounds, a federal superfund site.

=== Nassau County executive ===
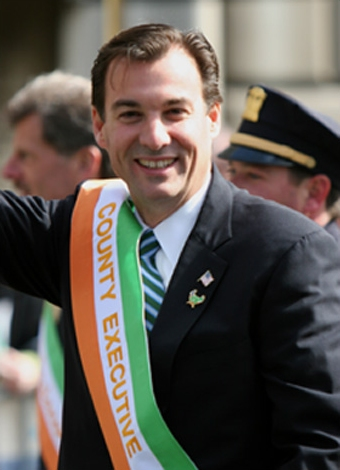
Suozzi at the 2005 New York City St. Patrick's Day Parade

Suozzi was elected Nassau County executive in 2001, becoming the first Democrat elected to the position in traditionally Republican Nassau in 30 years. He assumed office amid a fiscal crisis. By 1999, Nassau was on the brink of financial collapse: the county faced a $300 million annual deficit, was billions of dollars in debt, and its credit rating had sunk to one level above junk status. According to the New York Times, he "earned high marks from independent institutions for his signature achievement, the resuscitation of Nassau's finances."

While in office, Suozzi cut spending and reduced borrowing and debt. He also oversaw 11 county bond upgrades over two years, eliminated deficits in Nassau, and accumulated surpluses. In 2005, Governing Magazine named him one of its Public Officials of the Year, calling him "the man who spearheaded Nassau County, New York's, remarkable turnaround from the brink of fiscal disaster." According to the New York Times, he garnered praise for social services like his "no wrong door" program, which centralized access to social services.

Suozzi narrowly lost the 2009 county executive election to Ed Mangano. After working in the private sector as an attorney, he announced that he would seek a rematch against Mangano in 2013. He attacked Mangano for "presiding over a decline in the county" while also emphasizing eight years of balanced budgets and reduced crime while he was county executive. In November 2013, Mangano defeated Suozzi by a much wider margin of 59% to 41%.

=== Gubernatorial campaigns ===
==== 2006 ====
Suozzi declared his candidacy for governor of New York in the Democratic primary against Eliot Spitzer on February 25, 2006. Few prominent Democrats apart from Nassau County Democratic Party chairman Jay Jacobs supported his bid; most of New York's Democratic legislators and mayors campaigned for Spitzer. One of Suozzi's biggest supporters was Victor Rodriguez, founder of the now disbanded Voter Rights Party. Rodriguez eventually became the lead field organizer for his Albany campaign office. The campaign was funded in part by Home Depot co-founder Kenneth Langone, former NYSE CEO Richard Grasso, vice chairman of the MTA David Mack, and many people on Wall Street whom Spitzer had investigated and prosecuted.

On June 13, 2006, Suozzi spoke before the New York State Conference of Mayors along with Spitzer and John Faso. He received a standing ovation from the crowd of mayors. On July 6, he announced to his followers that he had collected enough petitions to place himself on the primary ballot. During a debate, he said he had presidential aspirations. On August 7, after much speculation, he announced that he would not seek an independent line were he to lose the primary.

Spitzer defeated Suozzi in the Democratic primary with 82% of the vote to Suozzi's 18%.

==== 2022 ====
On November 29, 2021, Suozzi announced his candidacy for governor of New York in the 2022 election. He strongly opposed a proposal by Governor Kathy Hochul to permit homeowners to add an accessory dwelling unit (such as an extra apartment and backyard cottage) on lots zoned for single-family housing. The proposal was intended to alleviate New York's housing shortage and make housing more affordable. He said that he supported efforts to tackle housing problems, but that he was against "ending single-family housing".

Suozzi placed third in the Democratic primary with 12% of the vote, behind Hochul's 65% and Jumaane Williams's 21%.

== U.S. House of Representatives ==
=== Elections ===
==== 2016 ====
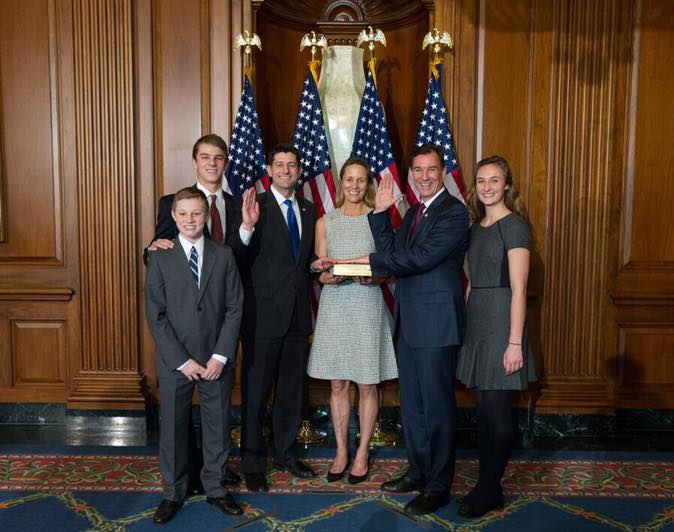
Suozzi is sworn into the 115th Congress, 2017

In June 2016, Suozzi, endorsed by Queens Borough President Melinda Katz, won a five-way Democratic primary in New York's 3rd congressional district, with 35% of the vote, defeating among others future New York State Assemblyman Steve Stern and future New York State Senator Anna Kaplan. He was endorsed by The New York Times, Newsday, and The Island Now. He defeated Republican state senator Jack Martins in the general election on November 8, 53% to 47% and began representing New York's 3rd congressional district in the 115th United States Congress in January 2017.

==== 2018 ====
In June 2018, Suozzi won the Democratic primary unopposed. In the general election, he defeated Republican nominee Dan DeBono 59% to 41%.

==== 2020 ====
In June 2020, Suozzi won a three-way Democratic primary in New York's 3rd congressional district with 66.5% of the votes. In the general election, he defeated Republican nominee George Santos 56% to 43%.

==== 2024 ====
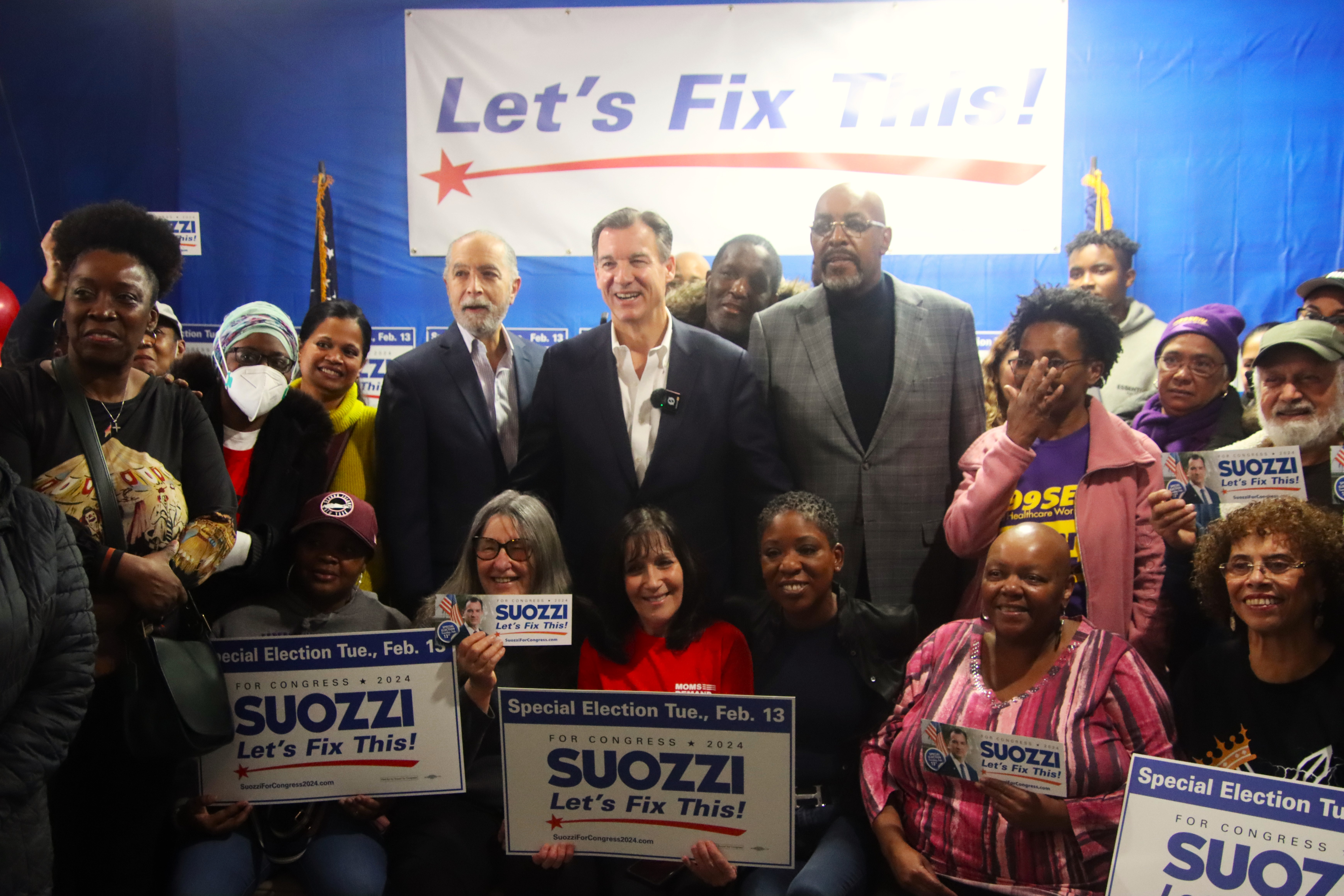
Suozzi at a 2024 special election campaign event

Suozzi announced his candidacy for New York's 3rd congressional district in the November 2023 election. After Congress expelled the district's representative George Santos, Suozzi also declared his candidacy for the special election to fill the end of his term. He was selected as the Democratic nominee on December 7, 2023, and defeated Republican nominee Mazi Melesa Pilip, a member of the Nassau County Legislature representing the 10th district, in the special election on February 13, 2024 by a margin of 54% to 46%. (Note: Pilip has been a registered Democrat since 2012, but was elected to the Nassau County Legislature as a Republican.)

As the winner of the special election, Suozzi served out the remainder of Santos's term in the House, which expired in January 2025. According to a December 2023 Politico article, solidarity with Israel in response to the 2023 Hamas-led attack on Israel was a top priority for the district, and both Suozzi and Pilip were "staunch supporters of Israel". Suozzi and Pilip primarily campaigned on the issue of an influx of migrants into the United States.

Suozzi was re-elected in November 2024, defeating Republican Mike LiPetri in the general election.

=== Tenure ===
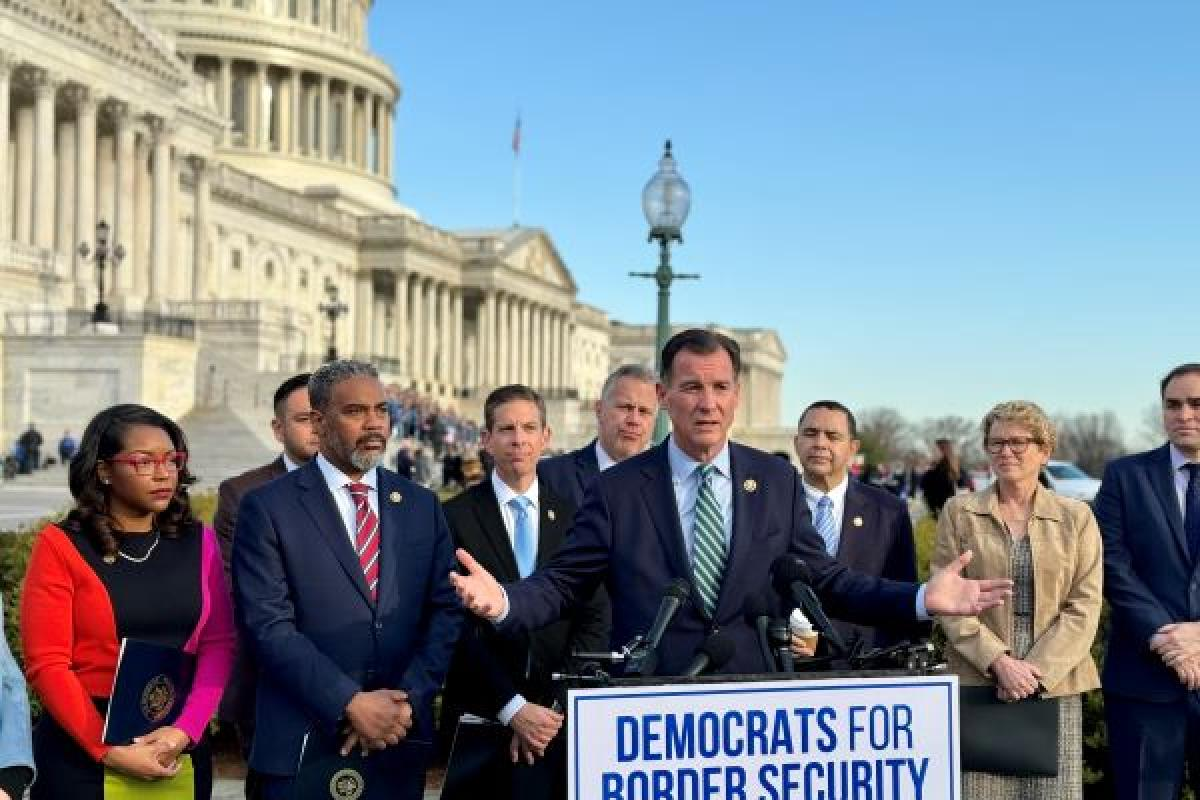
Suozzi pushes for a bipartisan solution for the United States–Mexico border crisis, 2024

In Congress, Suozzi prioritized tax policy. He authored legislation to restore the state and local tax (SALT) deduction, which was capped at $10,000 in 2017. He led efforts within the New York congressional delegation to eliminate the cap, though the initiative was unsuccessful.

In 2021, the Campaign Legal Center filed an ethics complaint against him, alleging he failed to report nearly 300 stock transactions worth between $3.2 million and $11 million, as required by the STOCK Act. During a congressional deposition, Suozzi defended the omissions, stating, "ethics is a big priority for me, but some of the formalities are not necessarily something I make a priority of." In July 2022, the House Ethics Committee ruled his violations were not "knowing or willful" and dismissed the case.

Suozzi voted in favor of military aid packages for Ukraine, Israel, and Taiwan in 2024, aligning with most Democrats.

Following Kamala Harris's defeat in the 2024 presidential election, he criticized the Democratic Party's stance on transgender participation in girls' sports and what he described as a "general attack on traditional values," provoking political backlash.

On January 1, 2025, Suozzi wrote an op-ed in The New York Times calling for Democrats to work with the incoming Trump administration and advocating for political compromise on parts of Trump's agenda.

In January 2025, Suozzi was elected Democratic co-chair of the Problem Solvers Caucus. Later that month, he was one of 46 House Democrats who joined Republicans to vote for the Laken Riley Act.

On March 6, 2025, Suozzi was one of ten Democrats in Congress who joined all of their Republican colleagues in voting to censure Democratic congressman Al Green for interrupting President Donald Trump's State of the Union Address. Suozzi opposed a potential New York redistricting effort in response to Trump pushing Republicans to draw out Democratic districts in Texas for the 2026 midterm elections.

On January 22, 2026, he voted to pass HR 7147 funding bill for the Dept. of Homeland Security, including funding for United States Immigration and Customs Enforcement (ICE). After the killing of Alex Pretti, he said he regretted voting to increase funding for ICE.

=== Committee assignments ===
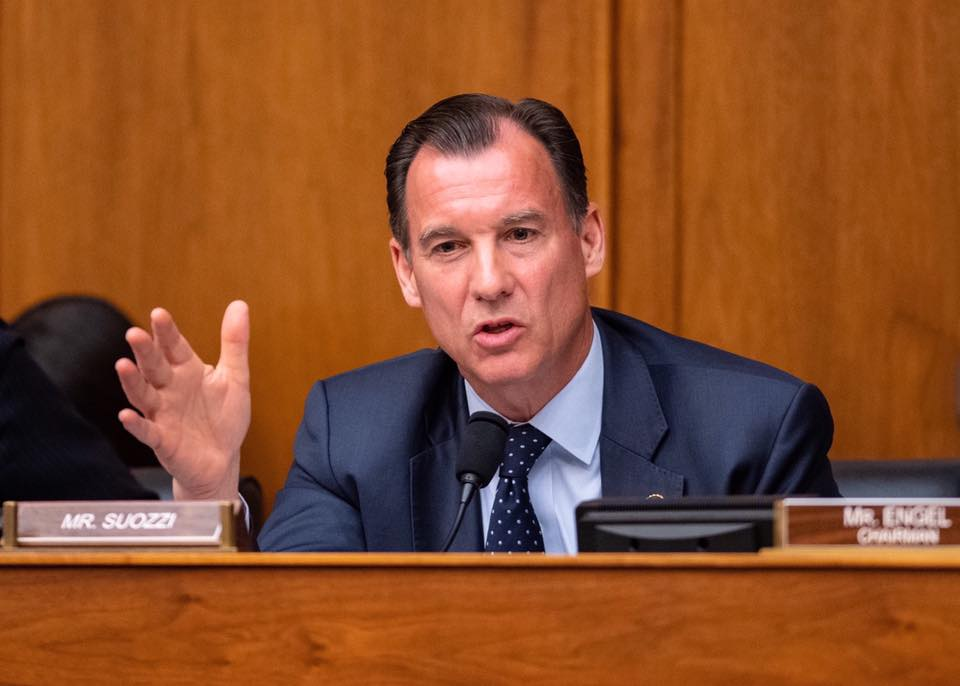
Suozzi sitting on the Foreign Affairs Committee, 2019

For the 119th Congress:

- Committee on Ways and Means
  - Subcommittee on Oversight
  - Subcommittee on Tax

=== Caucus memberships ===
Suozzi's caucus memberships include:

- Problem Solvers Caucus (co-chair)
- New Democrat Coalition
- SALT Caucus (co-chair)
- Quiet Skies Caucus (vice chair)
- International Conservation Caucus
- Uyghur Caucus (co-founder and co-chair)
- Democrats for Border Security Task Force (co-chair)
- Congressional Asian Pacific American Caucus
- Labor Caucus

== Personal life ==
Suozzi and his wife Helene (née Wrotniak) married in 1993. They live in Glen Cove and have three children. His son Joe is a minor league baseball player who has played in the New York Mets organization. Suozzi is Catholic.

== Electoral history ==
=== 2026 ===
2026 United States House of Representatives Democratic primary in New York, District 3
Party	Candidate	Votes	%
Democratic	Tom Suozzi (incumbent)	20,820	79.6
Democratic	Danielle Welch	5,263	20.1
Write-in		63	0.2
Total votes		26,146	100.0

2026 United States House of Representatives election in New York, District 3
Party	Candidate	Votes	%
Democratic	Tom Suozzi (incumbent)		
Republican	Michael J. LiPetri Jr.		
Conservative	Michael J. LiPetri Jr.		
Total	Michael J. LiPetri Jr.		
Write-in			
Total votes			

=== 2024 ===
2024 United States House of Representatives special election in New York, District 3
Party	Candidate	Votes	%
Democratic	Tom Suozzi	93,183	53.9
Republican	Mazi Melesa Pilip	69,778	40.4
Conservative	Mazi Melesa Pilip	9,512	5.5
Total	Mazi Melesa Pilip	79,290	45.9
Write-in		337	0.2
Total votes		172,810	100.0
Democratic gain from Republican			

2024 United States House of Representatives election in New York, District 3
Party	Candidate	Votes	%
Democratic	Tom Suozzi	185,491	51.1
Common Sense	Tom Suozzi	2,160	0.6
Total	Tom Suozzi (incumbent)	187,651	51.7
Republican	Michael J. LiPetri Jr.	161,197	44.4
Conservative	Michael J. LiPetri Jr.	13,497	3.7
Total	Michael J. LiPetri Jr.	174,694	48.1
Write-in		780	0.2
Total votes		363,125	100.0
Democratic hold			

=== 2022 ===
2022 New York gubernatorial Democratic primary
Party	Candidate	Votes	%
Democratic	Kathy C. Hochul (incumbent)	607,928	67.4
Democratic	Jumaane D. Williams	173,872	19.3
Democratic	Tom Suozzi	116,972	13.0
Write-in		3,730	0.4
Total votes		902,502	100.0

=== 2020 ===
2020 United States House of Representatives Democratic primary in New York, District 3
Party	Candidate	Votes	%
Democratic	Tom Suozzi (incumbent)	36,812	66.4
Democratic	Melanie D'Arrigo	14,269	25.7
Democratic	Michael Weinstock	4,284	7.7
Write-in		95	0.2
Total votes		55,460	100.0

2020 United States House of Representatives election in New York, District 3
Party	Candidate	Votes	%
Democratic	Tom Suozzi	196,056	52.6
Working Families	Tom Suozzi	9,203	2.5
Independence	Tom Suozzi	3,296	0.9
Total	Tom Suozzi (incumbent)	208,555	56.0
Republican	George A. D. Santos	147,461	39.6
Conservative	George A. D. Santos	14,470	3.9
Total	George A. D. Santos	161,931	43.4
Libertarian	Howard Rabin	2,156	0.6
Write-in		139	0.0
Total votes		372,781	100.0
Democratic hold			

=== 2018 ===
2018 United States House of Representatives election in New York, District 3
Party	Candidate	Votes	%
Democratic	Tom Suozzi	149,937	56.1
Independence	Tom Suozzi	2,962	1.1
Working Families	Tom Suozzi	2,838	1.1
Women's Equality	Tom Suozzi	1,376	0.5
Reform	Tom Suozzi	343	0.1
Total	Tom Suozzi (incumbent)	157,456	59.0
Republican	Dan P. DeBono	98,716	37.0
Conservative	Dan P. DeBono	10,798	4.0
Total	Dan P. DeBono	109,514	41.0
Write-in		92	0.0
Total votes		267,062	100.0
Democratic hold			

=== 2016 ===
2016 United States House of Representatives Democratic primary in New York, District 3
Party	Candidate	Votes	%
Democratic	Tom Suozzi	7,142	35.1
Democratic	Steve Stern	4,475	22.0
Democratic	Jon Kaiman	4,394	21.6
Democratic	Anna Kaplan	3,311	16.3
Democratic	Jonathan C. Clarke	1,021	5.0
Total votes		20,343	100.0

2016 United States House of Representatives election in New York, District 3
Party	Candidate	Votes	%
Democratic	Tom Suozzi	171,775	53.0
Republican	Jack M. Martins	133,954	41.3
Conservative	Jack M. Martins	16,410	5.1
Reform	Jack M. Martins	1,940	0.6
Total	Jack M. Martins	152,304	47.0
Write-in		175	0.1
Total votes		324,254	100.0
Democratic hold			

=== 2013 ===
2013 Nassau County Executive Democratic primary
Party	Candidate	Votes	%
Democratic	Tom Suozzi	19,519	58.5
Democratic	Adam M. Haber	13,739	41.2
Write-in		95	0.3
Total votes		33,353	100.0

2013 Nassau County Executive election
Party	Candidate	Votes	%
Republican	Edward P. Mangano (incumbent)	160,047	58.9
Democratic	Tom Suozzi	111,884	41.1
Total votes		271,931	100.0
Republican hold			

=== 2009 ===
2009 Nassau County Executive election
Party	Candidate	Votes	%
Republican	Edward P. Mangano	118,250	48.1
Democratic	Tom Suozzi (incumbent)	117,864	48.0
Conservative	Steven Hansen	9,552	3.9
Total votes		245,666	100.0
Republican gain from Democratic			

=== 2006 ===
2006 New York gubernatorial Democratic primary
Party	Candidate	Votes	%
Democratic	Eliot Spitzer	624,684	81.9
Democratic	Tom Suozzi	138,263	18.1
Total votes		762,947	100.0

=== 2005 ===
2005 Nassau County Executive election
Party	Candidate	Votes	%
Democratic	Tom Suozzi (incumbent)		~59.0
Republican	Gregory Peterson		~41.0
Total votes			100.0
Democratic hold			

=== 2001 ===
2001 Nassau County Executive Democratic primary
Party	Candidate	Votes	%
Democratic	Tom Suozzi	36,796	53.7
Democratic	Thomas P. DiNapoli	31,719	46.3
Total votes		68,515	100.0

2001 Nassau County Executive election
Party	Candidate	Votes	%
Democratic	Tom Suozzi		
Green	Tom Suozzi		
Total	Tom Suozzi	203,901	64.4
Republican	Bruce R. Bent		
Conservative	Bruce R. Bent		
Right to Life	Bruce R. Bent		
Total	Bruce R. Bent	104,052	32.8
Independence	Thomas P. DiNapoli		
Liberal	Thomas P. DiNapoli		
Working Families	Thomas P. DiNapoli		
Total	Thomas P. DiNapoli	8,470	2.7
Libertarian	Timothy J. LeBrun	364	0.1
Total votes		316,787	100.0
Democratic gain from Republican			

=== 1995 ===
1995 Glen Cove mayoral election
Party	Candidate	Votes	%
Democratic	Tom Suozzi (incumbent)	4,315	57.2
Republican	Vincent P. Taranto	3,226	42.8
Total votes		7,541	100.0
Democratic hold			

=== 1993 ===
1993 Glen Cove mayoral election
Party	Candidate	Votes	%
Democratic	Tom Suozzi	4,839	56.5
Republican	John L. Maccarone	3,731	43.5
Total votes		8,570	100.0
Democratic gain from Republican			

=== 1991 ===
1991 Glen Cove mayoral election
Party	Candidate	Votes	%
Republican	Donald P. DeRiggi (incumbent)	4,027	52.6
Democratic	Tom Suozzi	3,624	47.4
Total votes		7,651	100.0
Republican hold			

== See also ==
- List of United States representatives from New York
- New York's congressional delegations

== Notes ==
Political offices
Preceded by Thomas Gulotta	County Executive of Nassau County; 2001–2009	Succeeded by Ed Mangano
U.S. House of Representatives
Preceded by Steve Israel	Member of the U.S. House of Representatives from New York's 3rd congressional district 2017–2023	Succeeded by George Santos
Preceded by George Santos	Member of the U.S. House of Representatives from New York's 3rd congressional district 2024–present	Incumbent
Party political offices
Preceded by Josh Gottheimer	Democratic Co-Chair of the Problem Solvers Caucus; 2025–present Served alongside: Brian Fitzpatrick	Incumbent
U.S. order of precedence (ceremonial)
Preceded by Steven Horsford	United States representatives by seniority 188th	Succeeded by Jim Baird
