= Josh Lafazan =

American politician (born 1994)

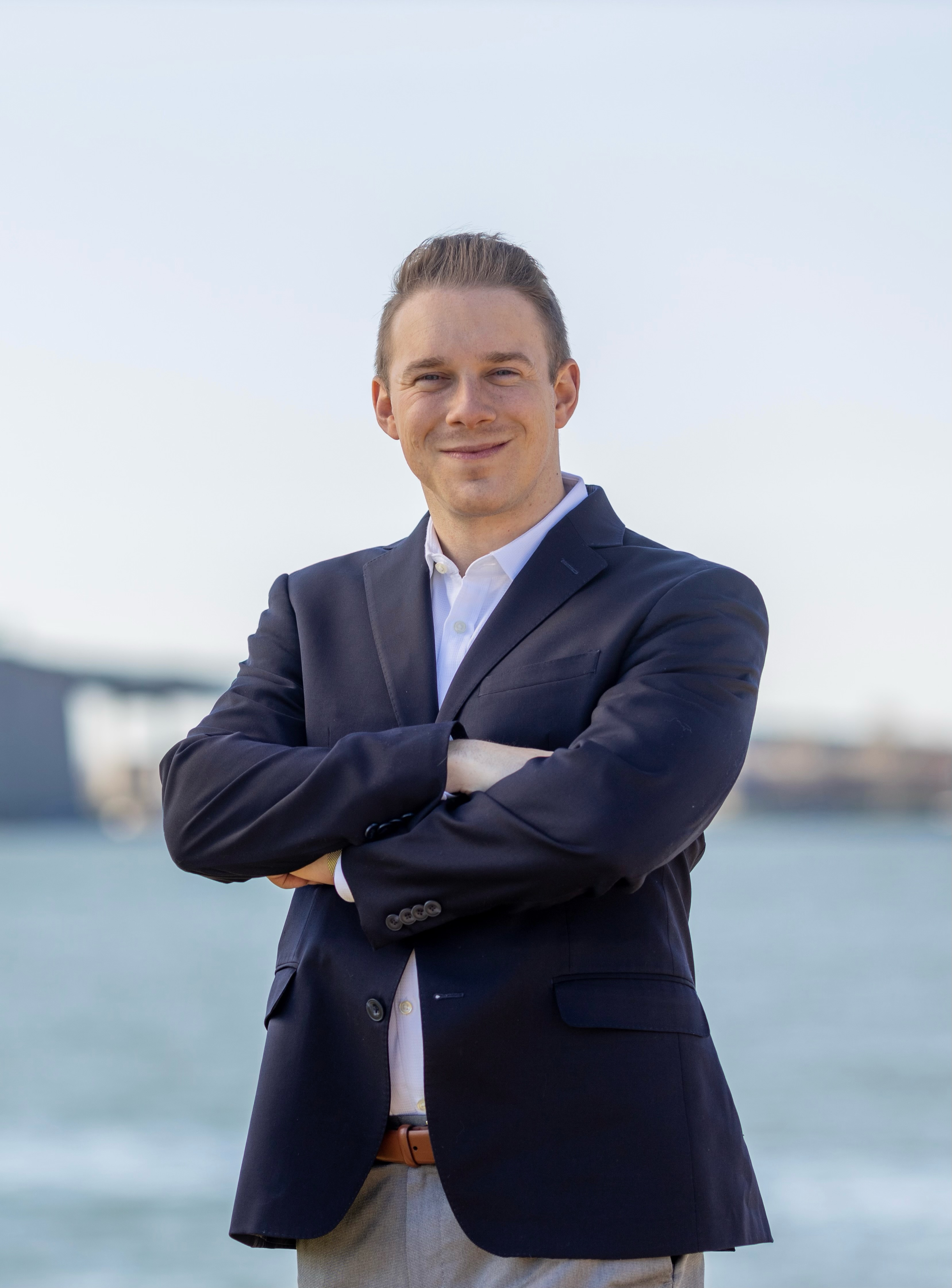
- Lafazan in 2022

Member of the Nassau County Legislature from the 18th district
- In office January 1, 2018 – December 31, 2023
- Preceded by: Donald MacKenzie
- Succeeded by: Samantha Goetz

Personal details
- Born: January 29, 1994 (age 32)
- Party: Democratic
- Education: Nassau Community College (AA); Cornell University (BS); Harvard University (MEd); University of Pennsylvania (EdD)
- Website: Official website

Joshua Alexander "Josh" Lafazan (born January 29, 1994) is an American politician, college educator, and a former member of the Nassau County Legislature from the 18th district in Nassau County, New York, United States. When elected to the Syosset School Board in 2012, he was the youngest elected official in New York State. He was a candidate to become the Democratic nominee for New York's 3rd congressional district in the 2022 United States House of Representatives election.

== Biography ==
=== Early life and education ===
Lafazan attended Nassau Community College and received the State University of New York Chancellor's Award for Student Excellence. Lafazan attended Cornell University for his Bachelor of Science degree and Harvard University for his Master of Education degree. He later earned his doctoral degree at the University of Pennsylvania.

As a high school senior at Syosset High School, he started a volunteer rideshare program to prevent drunk driving to drive teenagers home safely.

=== Career ===
During the latter part of his senior year of high school, Lafazan campaigned for a trustee position on the Syosset Board of Education. In May 2012, he won with 82 percent of the vote. He was the first high school student elected to the school board and upon his election, the youngest elected official in New York State. He was re-elected to the board in 2015 for another three-year term. Lafazan resigned from his position on the school board in 2017 after becoming an elected legislator, as required by county charter.

Lafazan was named on the Long Island Press Power List of the 50 most influential people on Long Island in 2012. He published Political Gladiators: How Millennials Can Navigate the 21st Century Political Minefield and WIN! in November 2015, a book about the experiences of other politicians who were elected at a young age.

In 2017, Lafazan ran for the Nassau County Legislature's 18th district against incumbent Republican Donald MacKenzie and won with 56 percent of the vote. Lafazan was re-elected to the county legislature in 2019 and 2021. In both elections he also accepted the ballot line of the New York Conservative Party. As a county legislator, Lafazan authored and passed "Timothy's Law" in August 2018, which established a county hotline for substance abuse intervention. Related legislation would create a smartphone application with resources for substance abuse, such as treatment center locations. His proposed "Dignity for Heroes" package marked veterans as a protected status under the county's human rights law.

Lafazan teaches a course on how to run for public office as a young candidate as adjunct professor at Long Island University.

In 2020 Lafazan accepted at least $50,000 in loans from billionaire investor Bryan Lawrence to make tuition payments; his 2022 opponent Robert Zimmerman sent a letter to the Federal Election Commission requesting a probe over the loan.

In December 2021, Lafazan announced his candidacy for the Democratic nomination in the 2022 race for New York's 3rd congressional district. He committed to term limits for the United States Congress. Lafazan courted – and received substantial support from – cryptocurrency interests, including Sam Bankman-Fried's Protect Our Future political action committee. He came in third in the primary.

In November 2023, Lafazan lost his re-election bid for the Nassau County Legislature to his Republican challenger, Samantha A Goetz.

== See also ==
- Bruce Blakeman
- Mazi Melesa Pilip
