= Mazi Melesa Pilip =

American politician (born 1978/79)

- מזי מלסה פיליפ
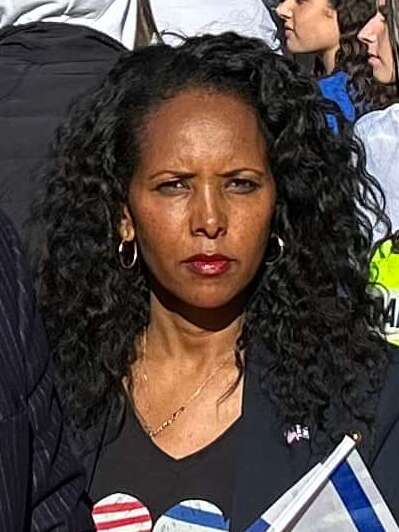
- Pilip in 2023

Member of the Nassau County Legislature from the 10th district
- Incumbent
- Assumed office January 1, 2022
- Preceded by: Ellen Birnbaum

Personal details
- Born: 1978 or 1979 (age 46–47) Ethiopia
- Citizenship: United States; Israel
- Party: Republican (before 2012, 2024–present); Democratic (2012–2024) (Note: Pilip had been a registered Democrat since 2012, but was elected to the Nassau County Legislature in 2021 and 2023 as a Republican.)
- Other political affiliations: Republican Caucus (2022–present)
- Spouse: Adalbert Pilip (m. 2005)
- Children: 7
- Education: University of Haifa (BA); Tel Aviv University (MA)

Military service
- Allegiance: Israel
- Branch/service: Israel Defense Forces
- Unit: 35th Paratroopers Brigade (Israel)

Mazi Melesa Pilip (Note: English: /ˈmɑːzi ˌmɛlɪˈsɑː ˈpɪlɪp/; Hebrew: מזי מלסה פיליפ; Amharic: ማዚ መለሳ ፒሊፕ) (born 1978 or 1979) is an American politician in the Nassau County Legislature representing the 10th district. A Republican, she is an Ethiopian Jew who immigrated to Israel when she was 12 years old, and later served as a gunsmith in the Israel Defense Forces. After her IDF service, she attended college at the University of Haifa and graduate school at Tel Aviv University. She immigrated to the United States in 2005.

Since 2021, Pilip has been a member of the Nassau County Legislature. While registered as a Democrat from 2012–24, she ran for the legislature on the Republican ballot line. In 2024, she was the Republican nominee for the U.S. House from New York's 3rd district in the special election following the expulsion of Republican George Santos, losing to Democrat Tom Suozzi.

== Early and personal life ==
Pilip was born in extreme poverty in a small village in rural Ethiopia that did not have electricity or running water, and is an Ethiopian Jew. She immigrated to Israel in 1991 as a refugee when she was 12 years old, along with her family, as part of Operation Solomon. The operation was an Israeli military operation that covertly airlifted over 14,000 Ethiopian Jews to Israel in a day and a half. She has three sisters, all of whom live in Israel, and one of whom is a police officer.

Upon turning 18 years of age, she served Israel's mandatory military service in the Israel Defense Forces' 35th Paratroopers Brigade (Tzanchanim) as a gunsmith. After her service in the army, Pilip studied at the University of Haifa, where she was chairwoman of the Ethiopian Student Union for two years, and earned a bachelor's degree in occupational therapy. She also studied at Tel Aviv University, earning a master's degree in diplomacy and security.

While at the University of Haifa she met her future husband, Adalbert Pilip, who was born in Ukraine. An American-Ukrainian-Jewish medical student from a family of Holocaust survivors, he had come from the United States to Haifa to study medicine at the Technion, and later became a cardiologist.

After Pilip and her husband married, they moved to the United States in 2005, ultimately settling in Great Neck, New York. She is an Orthodox Jew, has been vice president of her synagogue (Kol Yisrael Achim), and has been active in Great Neck politics and pro-Israel advocacy. She and her husband have seven children.

== Political career ==
=== Nassau County Legislature ===
In November 2021, Pilip was elected to New York's Nassau County Legislature as a Republican legislator for Nassau County, Long Island's 10th district, flipping it by defeating four-term incumbent Democrat Ellen Birnbaum by seven percentage points. The district covers Manhasset, Manhasset Hills, North Hills, Searingtown, Herricks, and the nine villages on the Great Neck peninsula, and is just east of New York City. She gave birth to twin daughters weeks before the election.

Pilip campaigned on reviving Great Neck's downtown, and acting as a bridge among the many minority communities in the district. She became the first-ever Republican from Great Neck to be elected a Nassau County Legislator. Her priorities have included public safety, helping businesses that struggled during the COVID-19 pandemic, and fighting antisemitism. She is chairwoman of the Nassau County Legislature Towns, Villages & Cities Committee, and vice chairwoman of its Health & Social Services Committee.

In November 2023, she won a second term as Nassau County legislator representing District 10 as a Republican (endorsed by the Conservative Party) with 60% of the vote. She had been endorsed by the New York League of Conservation Voters, which cited her driving legislation transferring county land to the Great Neck Park District, approving funding for a streets initiative and water quality protection, and supporting efforts to protect the county's sole source aquifer. Conservative donor and former US Ambassador to Austria Ronald Lauder was her biggest single donor during her race. She dedicated her win to Israel.

=== Congressional campaign ===
As early as January 2023, Pilip was put forward as a potential candidate should a special election be held to replace George Santos, who had been plagued by scandal since being elected in 2022, as representative for New York's 3rd congressional district in the 118th United States Congress. In December 2023, Santos was expelled, leaving the seat vacant.

On December 14, 2023, a panel of Republicans from Queens and Nassau Counties selected Pilip as the Republican nominee in the special election scheduled for February 13, 2024 to succeed Santos. The Nassau County legislative district that Pilip represented was part of the 3rd congressional district. The panel chose her after considering more than twenty candidates. Her opponent in the general election was Tom Suozzi, the district's former representative in Congress.

Although Pilip held office as a Republican and has adopted traditional Republican positions on certain issues, she was a registered Democrat. The campaign was largely fought on the issue of migration into the United States. Pilip agreed to participate in only one debate during the campaign, after early voting had started.

On February 13, 2024, Pilip received 46% of the vote to Suozzi's 54%.

== Political positions ==
=== Abortion ===
Pilip has described herself as "pro-life" while stating that "abortion is a very personal decision". She has said that she would not support a national abortion ban. However, she has refused to answer questions regarding restoring Roe v. Wade or her position on restrictions that fall short of a national ban.

=== Antisemitism ===
Pilip has spoken out extensively against antisemitism in the United States, particularly regarding antisemitism on American college campuses.

=== Crime ===
Pilip has made combatting rising crime rates and improving public safety a key focus of her platform, and cites it as a motivator for her campaign.

=== Gun control ===
When an audience member at a debate asked Pilip and Tom Suozzi whether they support a ban on the type of assault weapons frequently used in mass shootings, Pilip said, "I don't see any reason why the average American or individual would have more powerful weapons than our cops," but did not answer whether she supported banning semiautomatic weapons like AR-15s.

=== Israel ===
Support for Israel is viewed as a key issue in New York's 3rd congressional district, with both candidates underlining their staunch support of Israel with Pilip highlighting her service with the IDF's Paratroopers Brigade. She vocally supported Israel's response to the October 7 attacks, stating that Israel had an "obligation" to protect its civilians from terrorists.

=== Taxes ===
Pilip is in favor of taxes being low, and views taxes as one of the main issues for the district.

=== Donald Trump ===
Regarding the multiple indictments facing Donald Trump, Pilip has said: "Trump has to go through his process" and "No one's above the law. We have great candidates right now. Trump is one of them. We'll wait and see. Whoever the nominee is, we'll support him all the way." She added that she would not support Trump for president if he is convicted of a crime.

=== Ukraine ===
Pilip is in favor of continued U.S. support for Ukraine in its war against Russia.

=== Mexico–United States border crisis ===
Pilip is opposed to the 2024 U.S. Senate bill to address the Mexico–United States border crisis, saying its passage would amount to "the legalization of the invasion of our country". She was endorsed by the National Border Patrol Council labor union in February 2024.

=== Masking ===
Pilip opposes the wearing of face masks in public places and sponsored Nassau County's mask ban, claiming that "terrorist supporters" were "hiding behind" masks while "terrorizing the Jewish community." Pilip's proposed legislation, which was signed into law in August 2024, was condemned by public-health experts and received strong opposition from civil- and disability-rights advocates.
