= Ruvo del Monte =

- Comune
- Comune di Ruvo del Monte
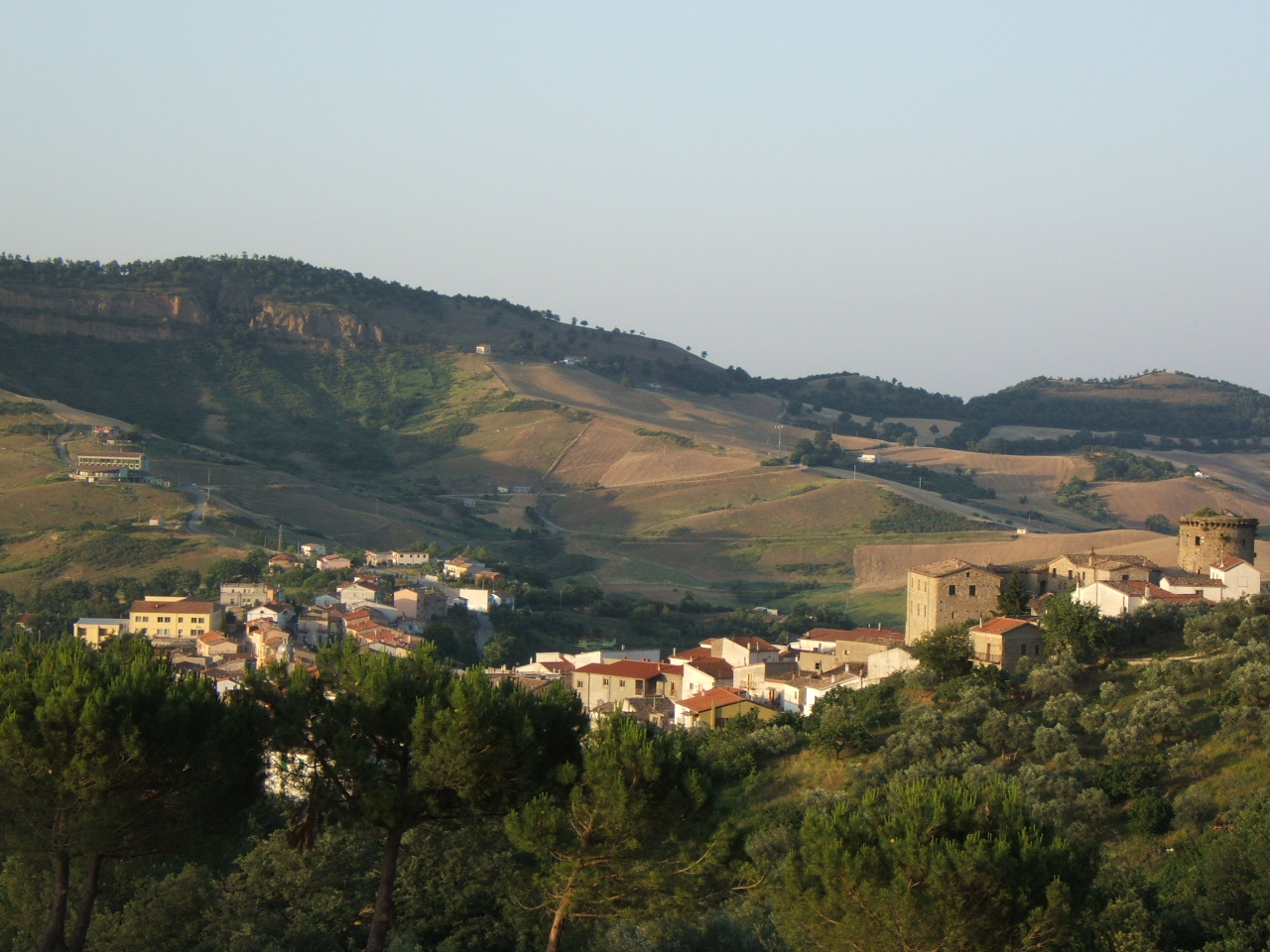
- View of Ruvo del Monte

- Coat of arms

- Location within Italy Location within Basilicata
- Coordinates: 40°51′N 15°32′E
- Country: Italy
- Region: Basilicata
- Province: Potenza (PZ)

Government
  - Mayor: Donato Carmine Romano

Area
  - Total: 32 km^{2} (12 sq mi)
- Elevation: 630 m (2,070 ft)

Population (31 December 2009)
  - Total: 1,122
  - Density: 35/km^{2} (91/sq mi)
- Demonym: Ruvesi
- Time zone: UTC+1 (CET)
  - Summer (DST): UTC+2 (CEST)
- Postal code: 85020
- Dialing code: 0976
- ISTAT code: 076072
- Website: Official website

Ruvo del Monte (Lucano: Rùve) is a town and comune in the province of Potenza, in the region of Basilicata. It is bounded by the comuni of Atella, Calitri, Rapone, Rionero in Vulture, San Fele.
