= Roslyn–Flower Hill Elementary School =

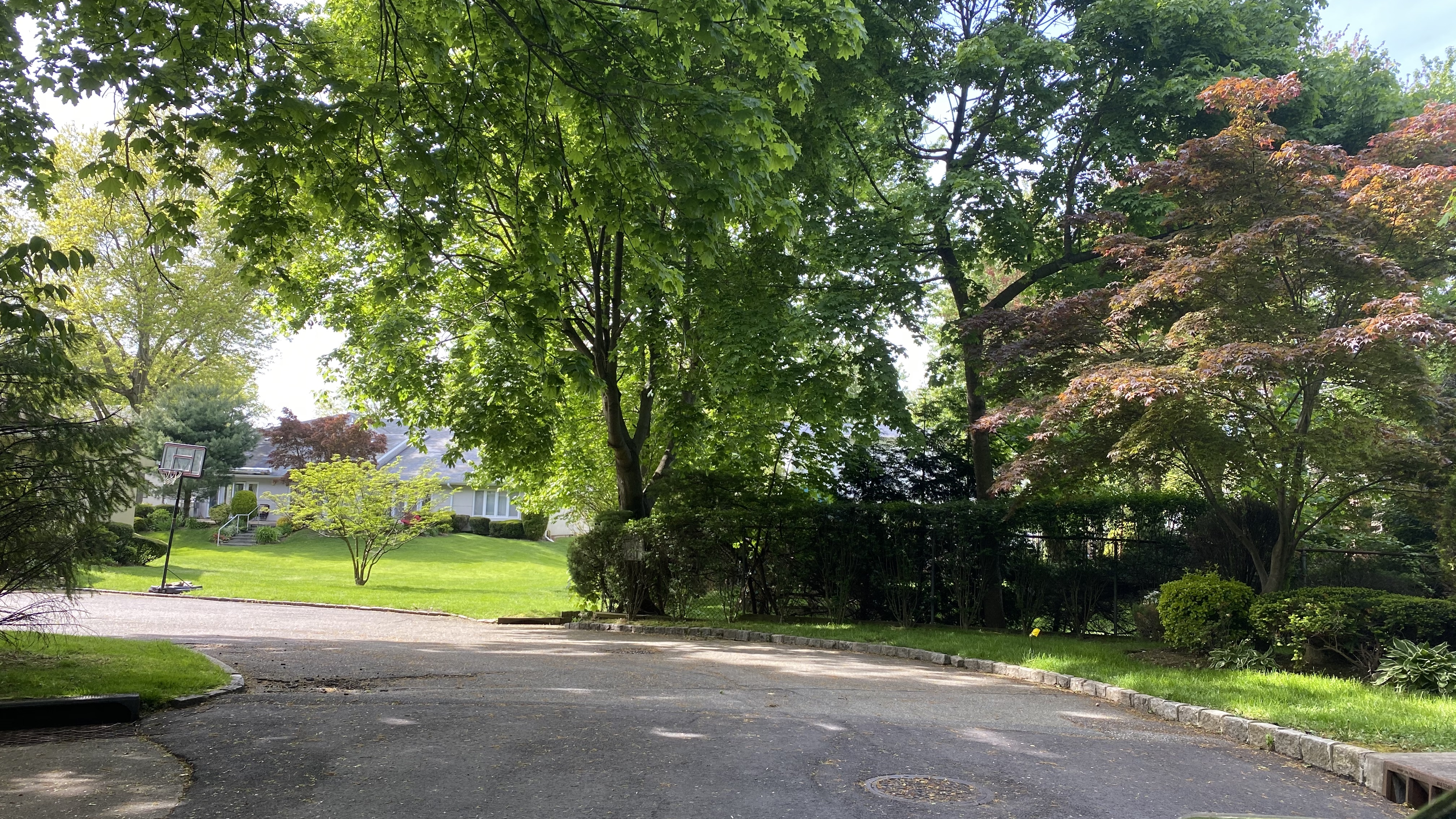
- The former site of the Roslyn–Flower Hill Elementary School in 2020

Location
- 35 Center Drive, Flower Hill, NY 11576
- Coordinates: 40°48′13″N 73°39′49″W

Information
- School type: Public elementary school
- Opened: January 12, 1953
- Status: Demolished; land redeveloped as a housing development
- Closed: 1980
- School district: Roslyn Union Free School District
- Grades: K–3
- Classrooms: 5
- Area: ≥3 acres

The Roslyn–Flower Hill Elementary School (also known as the Flower Hill Elementary School, the Flower Hill Neighborhood School, or simply as the Flower Hill School) was a local, public elementary school located within the Incorporated Village of Flower Hill in Nassau County, on Long Island, in New York, United States. It was operated by the Roslyn Union Free School District.

== History ==
=== Need for new schools, mid-to-late 1940s ===
Following World War II, the United States saw a population boom and the rise of mass suburbanization. The Greater Roslyn area was no exception to this, leading to many new suburban housing developments being constructed throughout the area around this time.

==== Proposals made, 1948 ====
In response to the influx of new residents and students within the district's boundaries, Roslyn's then-superintendent, George Edison Bryant, proposed building the Roslyn–Flower Hill Elementary School in Flower Hill (as well as two other new elementary schools in the district). He stated during a 1948 school board meeting that 1,600 homes were located in the district prior to World War II, and there were as many new homes being built following it, and new schools needed to be constructed in order to increase the district's capacity as a result.

Bryant, who at one point was a Flower Hill resident, proposed making this school a 5-classroom neighborhood school to serve children in Flower Hill zoned to attend Roslyn's schools, and serve as a community center for the neighborhood.

The one-story, five-classroom Roslyn–Flower Hill Elementary School and the nearby Highland Elementary School in Roslyn Estates – approved by the district as part of the same project – would be among the first neighborhood schools of their type in this portion of New York State; they were built to resemble a home as opposed to a stereotypical, "institution-like" structure. This design method was used to make the transition from being home to being at school easier for young students.

The school would also feature playgrounds for year-round use.

==== Land acquired, January 1949 ====
In January 1949, the Roslyn Union Free School District took ownership of the future school's property. The property, which had an area of more than 3 acres (1.2 ha), was purchased by the school district for a cost of approximately $5,000 per acre (1949 USD).

==== Plans approved, September 13, 1949 ====
During a September 13, 1949 school vote, voters in the Roslyn Union Free School District approved the construction of the Roslyn–Flower Hill Elementary School, to be built on the property in Flower Hill purchased by the district that past January. The estimated total cost for the school was $265,000 (1949 USD), as per the amount allocated in the budget for the school's construction.

=== Roslyn–Flower Hill Elementary School, 1953–1980 ===
The school was opened on January 12, 1953, and was located at the end of Center Drive in Flower Hill. The village's Broadridge housing development is located at the former school's southern end, with Woodland Road in what would eventually become the Wildwood at Flower Hill housing development at its northern end.

A flag-raising ceremony took place at 9 AM that morning, during which the students congregated around the flagpole. Boy scouts, girl scouts, and cub scouts were all represented at the ceremony, as well. The flag, which was donated to the Roslyn School District by the parents of the students, was raised, and a bugle was sounded. This was followed by students reciting the Pledge of Allegiance, and then singing "America". Superintendent Bryant then came forward, greeting and speaking to the students.

The ceremony lasted approximately 15–20 minutes, and was short due to the cold weather.

The school was often used as a place in which community meetings were held – including a public hearing in the 1970s regarding a controversial rezoning plan, which would downsize a greenbelt area adjacent to Hempstead Harbor in order to create an industrial park. Over 250 residents were in attendance for that meeting, which took place inside the building.

The Roslyn–Flower Hill Elementary School served Roslyn students residing in the area between kindergarten and third grade.

The school was designed by the Manhattan-based firm of Moore & Hutchins.

==== Hepatitis scare, 1974 ====
In 1974, an incident occurred when a kindergarten teacher in the school contracted hepatitis. As a result of the teacher's illness, children in the school were sent home with letters for their parents, assuring them that the chances that the disease would spread was very remote, and health officials concluded that there was no need for the children to be inoculated.

==== Closure, 1980 ====
The school served the community until September 1980, when it was closed, due to the declining enrollment numbers following the baby-boom era; district enrollment totals decreased by 23% between 1966 and 1975. It was the fourth school closed by the Roslyn Union Free School District within an eight-year span due to these enrollment declines.

Many parents in the community were concerned over the district's plans to close the school, and, during a school board meeting on March 13, 1980, the Roslyn Board of Education was presented with a petition signed by 774 residents, protesting the Flower Hill School's closure.

Despite the community's efforts to keep the Flower Hill School opened, its closure was approved by the Roslyn Board of Education during the next board meeting on March 24, 1980, during which the school board voted 6–to–1 in favor of doing so. Financial burdens were cited by the school district as a reason for the school's closure, and it was estimated in 1980 that by closing the school, the district would be able to save roughly $100,000 (1980 USD) annually.

=== After the school, 1980s–present ===
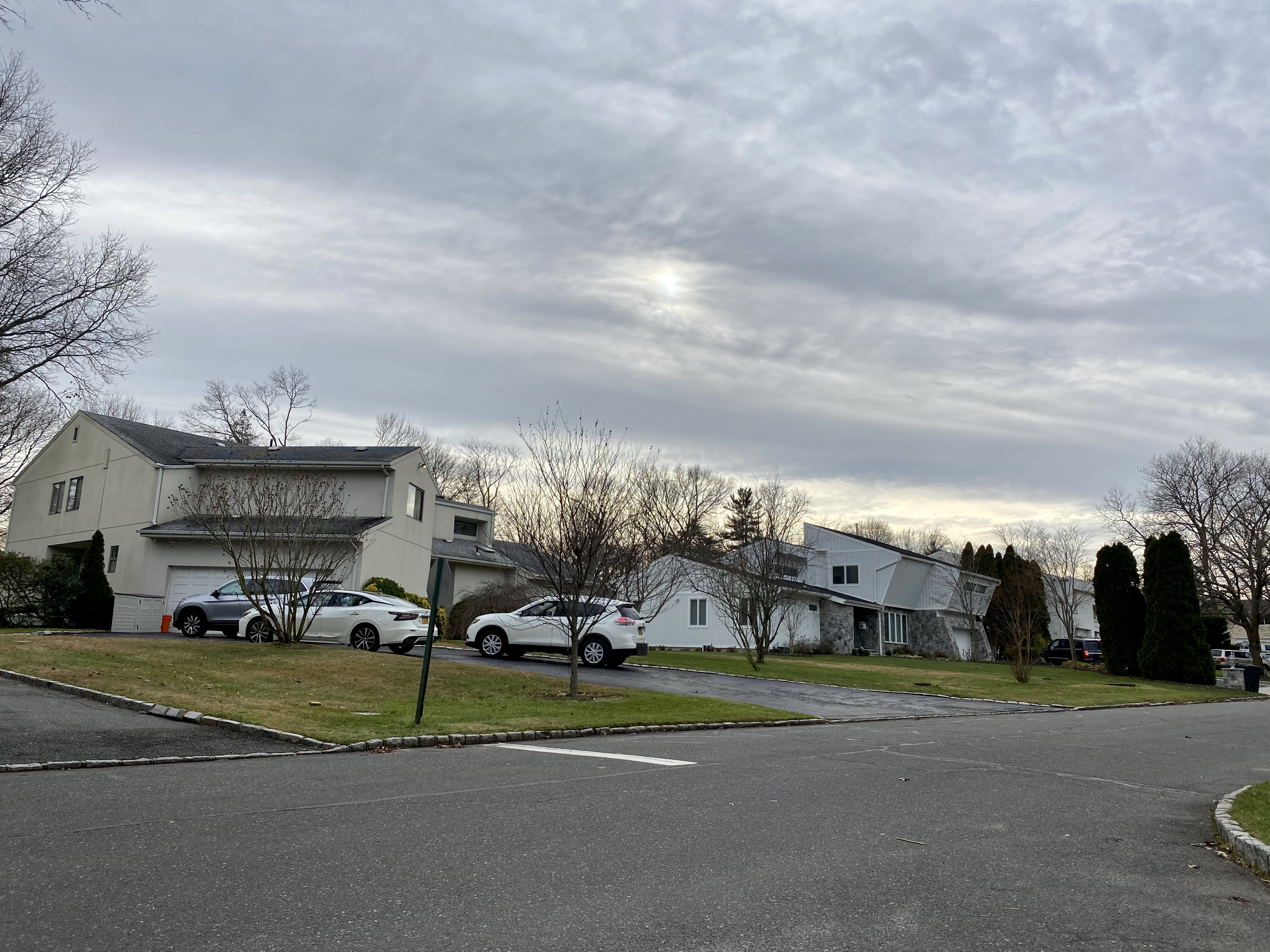
The Mashady Estates subdivision – built on the former school's grounds – in 2020

Following the Roslyn School District's closure of the school, the building was briefly used as an early childhood center before that program was moved to the former Village School in the neighboring village of Roslyn.

After its closure, Flower Hill residents and officials attempted to purchase some or all of the property with the intentions of turning it into a neighborhood park, complete with a playground and sports facilities. Their efforts were unsuccessful, as the Village of Flower Hill was unable to secure the highest bid for the property.

In 1982, following Flower Hill's unsuccessful bid for the property, the Roslyn Board of Education sold the vacant school to developers for $620,000 (1982 USD). The sale was approved by the school district in a vote of 1,079-to-344.

Subsequently, the vacant school was demolished, and the property was subdivided, becoming the Mashady Estates housing development in the 1980s, and now consists of multiple single-family homes; it was developed by the N & H Development Corporation. This housing development includes 8 single-family homes on 15,000 square-foot (1,400 m^{2}) lots.

== Notable alum ==
- Daniel Dorff – Classical composer, clarinetist, and saxophonist.

== See also ==
- Roslyn High School – The Roslyn Union Free School District's high school.
- Vincent Smith School – Another school located in Flower Hill.
