= Benjamin Heller =

Benjamin Heller may refer to:

- Ben Heller, American baseball pitcher
- Benjamin Heller (lawyer), English-American lawyer and politician

== See also ==
- Ben Heller (art collector) (1925–2019), American real estate magnate, textile mogul, and art collector
