= Carlos Munson =

Cuban-American businessman and philanthropist (1869–1940)

Carlos Walter Munson

Village Trustee of Flower Hill, New York
- In office 1931–1939

Personal details
- Born: November 1, 1869 Havana, Cuba
- Died: July 7, 1940 (aged 70) Port Washington Doctor's Sanitarium, Port Washington, New York
- Spouse: Mabel Munson (born Williams)
- Relatives: Walter D. Munson (father); Frank C. Munson (brother)
- Education: Adelphi Academy
- Occupation: Businessman; philanthropist; politician
- Known for: Munson Line; Flower Hill, New York; St. Francis Hospital

Carlos Walter Munson was a Cuban-American businessman, philanthropist, and politician, and was the former president of the Munson Steamship Line. He was a key figure in the incorporation of Flower Hill, New York, as a village, as well as the establishment of St. Francis Hospital in Flower Hill.

== Career ==
Prior to becoming an executive of the Munson Steamship Line, Carlos began working for his father as a freight checker. In 1908, Carlos Munson became the president of the Munson Steamship Line, taking over for his father, following his death. He held this position until 1913, when he handed it to his brother, Frank. After handing his brother the position of president, Carlos became the chairman of the Munson Steamship Company's board. He then became president of the company again, following his brother's death in 1936.

In 1939, Munson created the Carlos W. Munson Corporation, which operated foreign flag cargo ships.

== Biography ==
=== Early life and education ===
Munson was born in Havana, Cuba on November 1, 1869, to Walter David Munson, the founder of the Munson Steamship Line. When he was 14, he and his family moved from Cuba to Brooklyn, New York.

Munson graduated from Adelphi Academy in 1889, where he met his wife, Mabel Williams.

=== Adult life ===
Around 1904, Carlos and Mabel Munson moved to what is now the Village of Flower Hill, purchasing a large piece of property from the Hewlett family, which Munson named Elderfields.

After moving in, Carlos and Mabel walked to the center of modern-day Flower Hill during an evening in the summertime. During this time, a tavern was located there, and it was a gathering point for drunken men. Unhappy to be living adjacent to the drunks, Carlos purchased the land in the area to resolve the issue.

Around the time of this land purchase, the Franciscan Missionaries of Mary approached the Munsons to try and sell handmade linens. After forming a friendship with the sisters, Carlos offered 15 acres (6.1 ha) of his property to the Franciscan Missionaries; this offer was accepted. The sisters then developed the 15-acre (6.1 ha) parcel of land that Munson gave them into St. Francis Hospital. Until his death, Munson would often visit the hospital to read children's books to sick children at the hospital.

Additionally, Munson began having portions of Elderfields developed, laying out roads and houses, and erecting a real estate office on Bonnie Heights Road, which was located on the property where Flower Hill Village Hall now sits. It was within Carlos Munson's real estate office that local residents voted unanimously in favor of incorporating Flower Hill as a village, and was the location of the first village trustee meeting.

Munson was originally chosen to be the first Mayor of Flower Hill in 1931. However, he turned down the position and was instead appointed as a Trustee of Flower Hill, serving in that capacity from 1931 until 1939.

He is regarded as being the founding father of Flower Hill.

==== Bankruptcy, 1935 ====
In 1935, Carlos Munson filed for bankruptcy, when the Munson Steamship Line was heavily impacted by the Great Depression. Tax records show that he struggled to pay his taxes during this time, and he began selling his large portions of his land to developers such as Newell & Daniel, who would develop a portion of Munson's estate into the Colonial Estates subdivision of Flower Hill.

=== Death ===
Carlos Munson died on July 7, 1940, at the Port Washington Doctor's Sanitarium in Port Washington. He bequeathed $50,000 (1940 USD) of his fortune to St. Francis Hospital.

=== Legacy ===
A green space on Elderfields Road in Flower Hill is named Carlos W. Munson Green, in honor of Munson.

== Personal life ==
Munson was a Quaker, and he did not have any children.
