= Henry Johanson =

American architect (died 1975)

Henry William Johanson
- Died: January 1975
- Occupation: Architect
- Years active: 20th century
- Known for: Rescue Hook & Ladder Company No. 1 Firehouse, Flower Hill Village Hall

Henry Johanson was a 20th-century American architect who worked extensively in designing buildings throughout the New York metropolitan area. A number of his works have been listed on the National Register of Historic Places.

== Biography and career ==
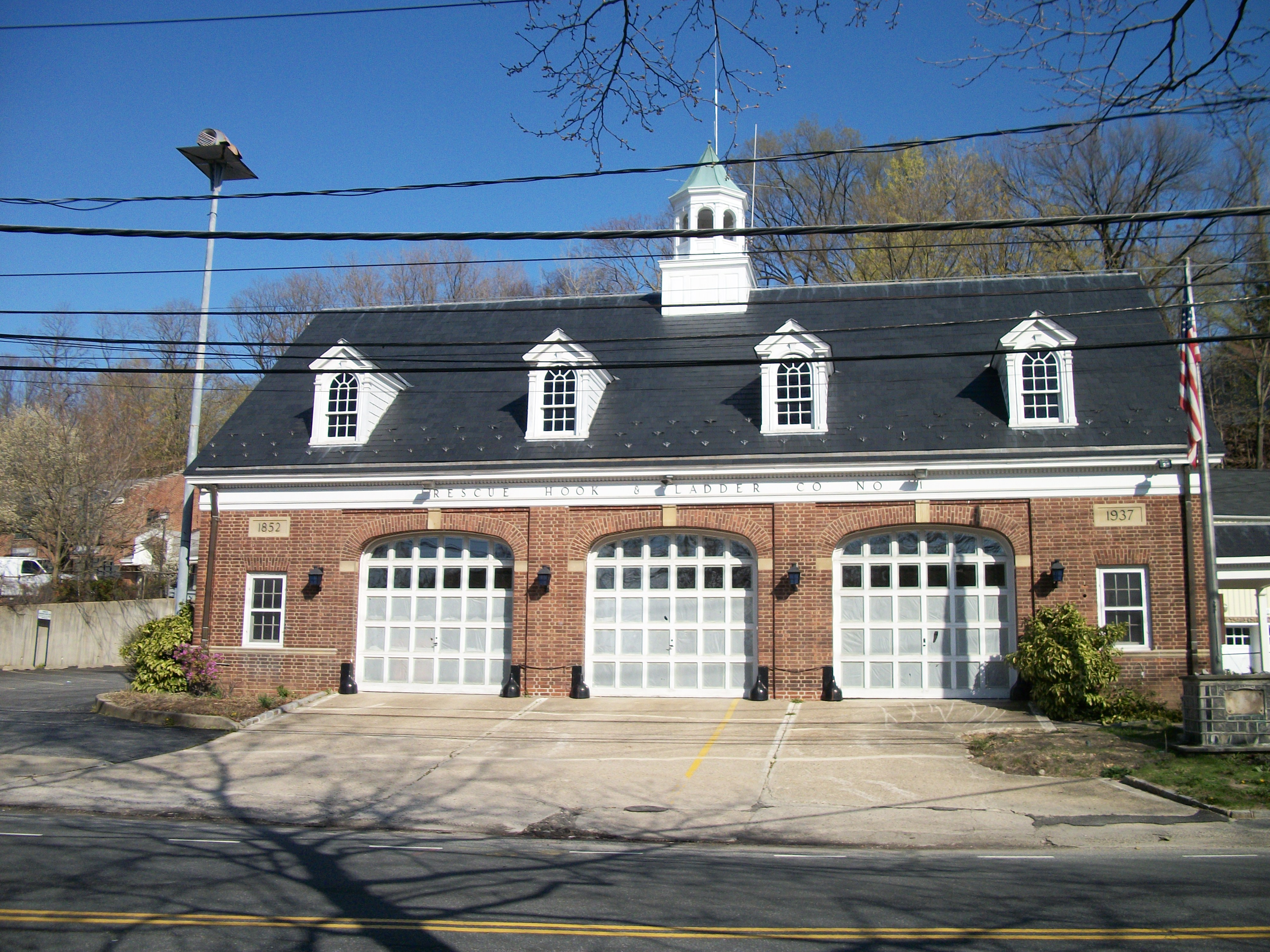
The Rescue Hook & Ladder Co. 1 Firehouse in Roslyn, a federally-designated landmark

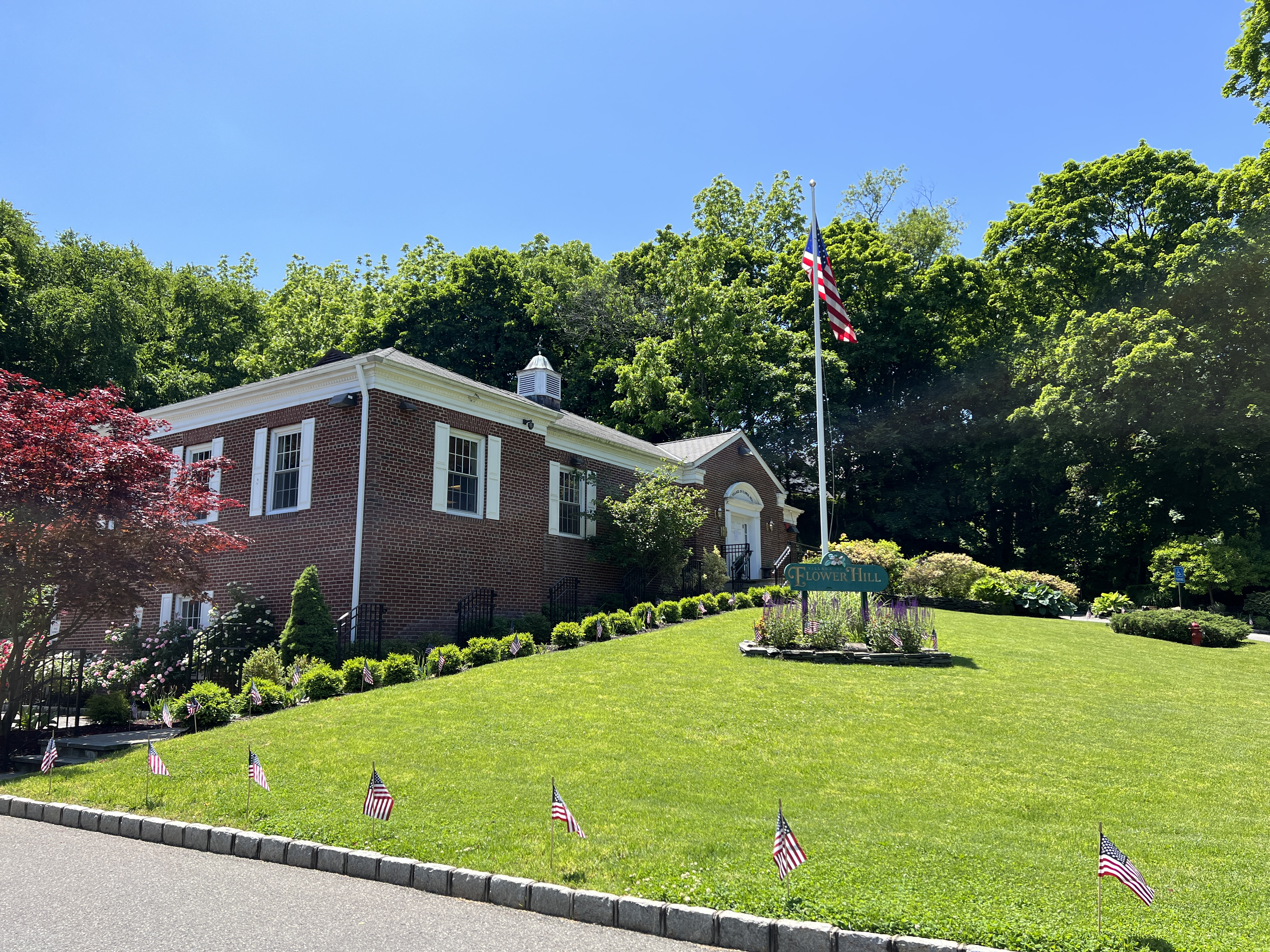
Flower Hill Village Hall, in Flower Hill, New York

Henry Johanson's office was located at 2 Main Street in Roslyn, New York. He is best known for his work throughout the New York metropolitan area – specifically in Queens and suburban Long Island, including places such as Flower Hill, Roslyn, Roslyn Estates, and Garden City in Nassau County – and in Jamaica Estates in Queens. In 1937, Johanson designed Roslyn's original Rescue Hook & Ladder Company No. 1 Firehouse, which was added to the National Register of Historic Places in 1991. He also designed the Lincoln Building in Roslyn, which is a contributing property in the Main Street Historic District – along with several Roslyn homes on Sinclair Martin Drive (which are part of a municipal historic district governed by the Village of Roslyn). In 1948, Johanson designed Flower Hill Village Hall – the government offices for the Village of Flower Hill, New York; he had previously designed several private residences within the village – including many in Walter Uhl's Flower Hill Estates development.

In 1947, Johanson designed 330 homes for a new, large-scale housing development in Garden City, New York. In 1950, he designed 23 homes for a new development in Lido Beach, New York, and in 1951, he would design several homes in a new development in Roslyn Estates, New York. A few years later, in 1954, he designed 100 additional homes in a large-scale development in Williston Park, New York, known as North Shore Estates – and in 1955 he designed 23 homes for the Fairway Estates development in Roslyn Harbor, New York, adjacent to the Engineers Country Club. Many of the homes designed by Johanson were noted for their designs.

Johanson also served as the Building Inspector of the Village of Flower Hill.

=== Death and legacy ===
Henry Johanson died in January 1975. A park in Flower Hill is named Henry W. Johanson Green, in honor of Johanson.

== Notable works ==
- Flower Hill Village Hall (Flower Hill, New York, 1948–49)
- Lincoln Building (Roslyn, New York, 1926)
- Rescue Hook & Ladder Company No. 1 Firehouse (Roslyn, New York, 1937)

== See also ==
- Frank Genese
- Charles Vachris
- Manoug Exerjian
