= Elderfields Preserve =

Elderfields Preserve Elderfields Historic Preserve
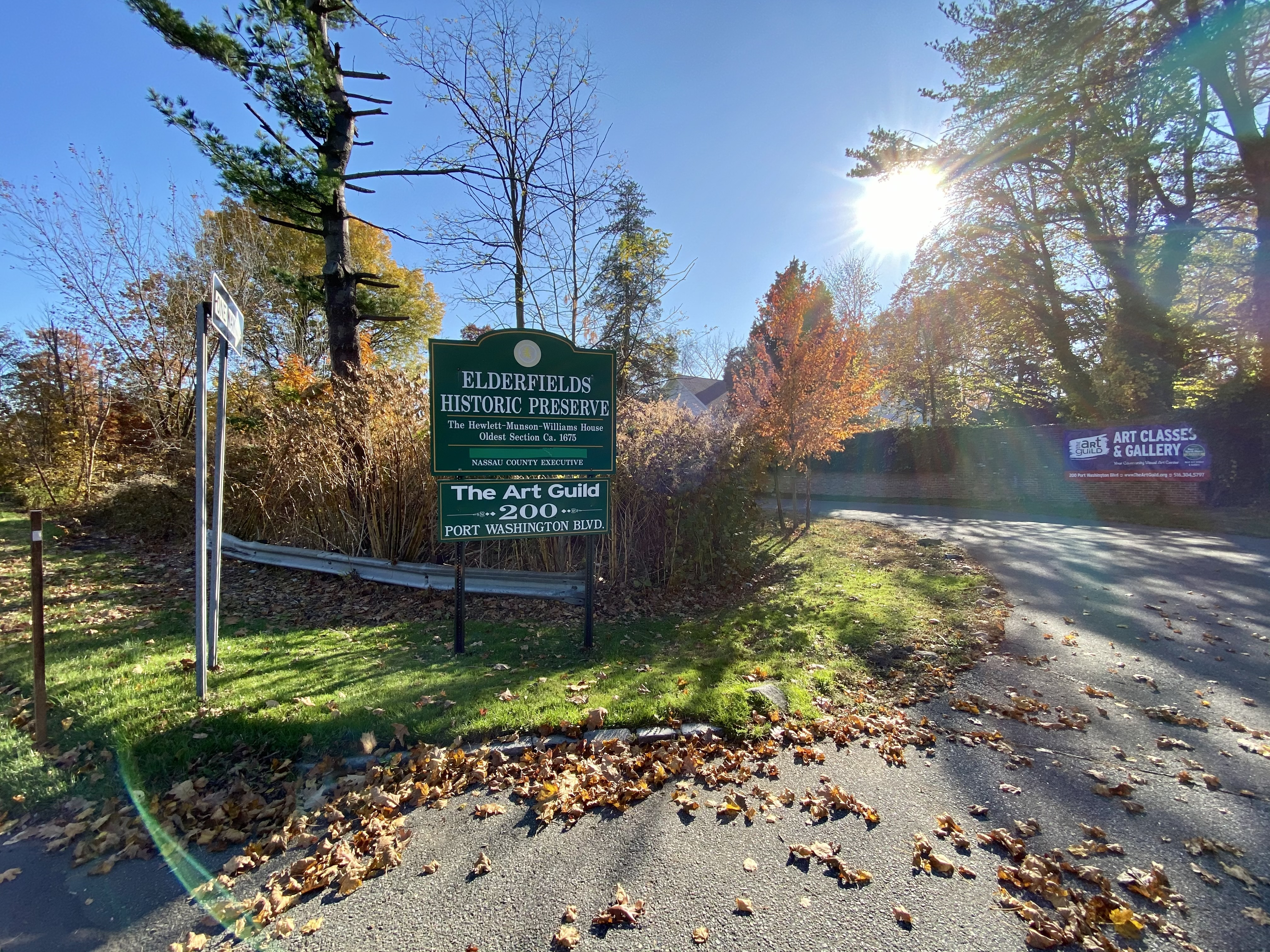
- The entrance to the Elderfields Preserve in 2020
- Interactive map of Elderfields Preserve; Elderfields Historic Preserve
- 40°48′24.6″N 73°40′14.1″W
- Location: 200 Port Washington Boulevard, Manhasset, NY 11030; Flower Hill, New York

Site notes
- Owner: County of Nassau

Elderfields Preserve (also known as Elderfields Historic Preserve or colloquially as Elderfields) is a historic museum, farm, nature preserve, and cultural center located within the Incorporated Village of Flower Hill, in Nassau County, on Long Island, in New York, United States. it is owned and operated by the County of Nassau.

== Description ==
=== Overview ===
The preserve is home to the Hewlett-Munson-Williams House. This farmhouse was built around 1675 as part of the historic Hewlett farm, making it one of the oldest homes still standing in the area and on Long Island, as a whole. The Hewlett family owned this property for 224 years. It was eventually purchased by Carlos W. Munson – the heir to the Munson Steamship Company – in 1904. Carlos and his wife, Mabel, were prominent figures in the early history of Flower Hill, and he was the person who named the farm Elderfields.

Henry de V. Williams would eventually purchase the property, and bequeathed it to Nassau County; the county acquired it in 1996, upon Williams' death.

A walled garden and two carriage sheds are also located in the preserve.

=== The Art Guild ===
Elderfields Preserve is also home to The Art Guild of Port Washington. The Art Guild offers art classes, summer programs, and studio space. They also put on art shows and exhibitions for the public.

== See also ==
- Flower Hill Village Park
- North Hempstead Country Club
- Sands-Willets Homestead - Another historic home and museum within the Village of Flower Hill.
