= Ricardo Caputo =

Argentine American serial killer

- Undated photo of Caputo
- Born: 1949; Mendoza, Mendoza Province, Argentina
- Died: October 1, 1997 (aged 48); Attica State Prison, Attica, New York, U.S.
- Other name: "The Lady Killer"

Details
- Victims: 4–6
- Span of crimes: 1971–1977
- Country: United States, Mexico
- States: New York, California, State of Mexico
- Date apprehended: March 1, 1994

Ricardo Silvio Caputo (1949 – October 1, 1997) was an Argentine American serial killer active during the 1970s who was known as The Lady Killer.

== Life ==
Caputo was born in 1949 in Mendoza, Argentina. In 1970, he moved to the United States and settled in New York City. According to his brother Alberto, Caputo was physically and sexually abused as a child.

Though he was not definitively linked to any murders after 1977, he remained a fugitive throughout the 1980s, and finally surrendered to police in 1994.

Incarcerated at Attica State Prison in New York, Caputo had a fatal heart attack in October 1997, at the age of 48.

== Victims ==
- Nathalie Brown, 19, Flower Hill, New York (1971) – He was declared mentally incompetent to stand trial at the time, then escaped from Manhattan Psychiatric Center on Wards Island in 1974.
- Judith Becker, 26, Yonkers, New York (1974)
- Barbara Ann Taylor, 28, San Francisco (1975)
- Laura Gomez, Mexico City (1977)

== Suspected victims ==
- Devon Green, 23, Los Angeles (1981) – Caputo became a suspect in Green's death when a former coworker of hers spotted him on a crime show and identified Caputo as having worked at a Los Angeles restaurant where Green was a chef. Already imprisoned when this information came to light in 1994, Caputo was neither charged with nor did he admit to her murder.
- Jacqueline Bernard, 64, New York City (1983) – Caputo was a suspect in this murder but was never charged. A friend of the victim's, Linda Wolfe, published a book titled Love Me to Death in 1998 in which she conjectured that Caputo was Bernard's killer.

== See also ==
- List of serial killers in the United States
