= Flower Hill, New York =

- Village
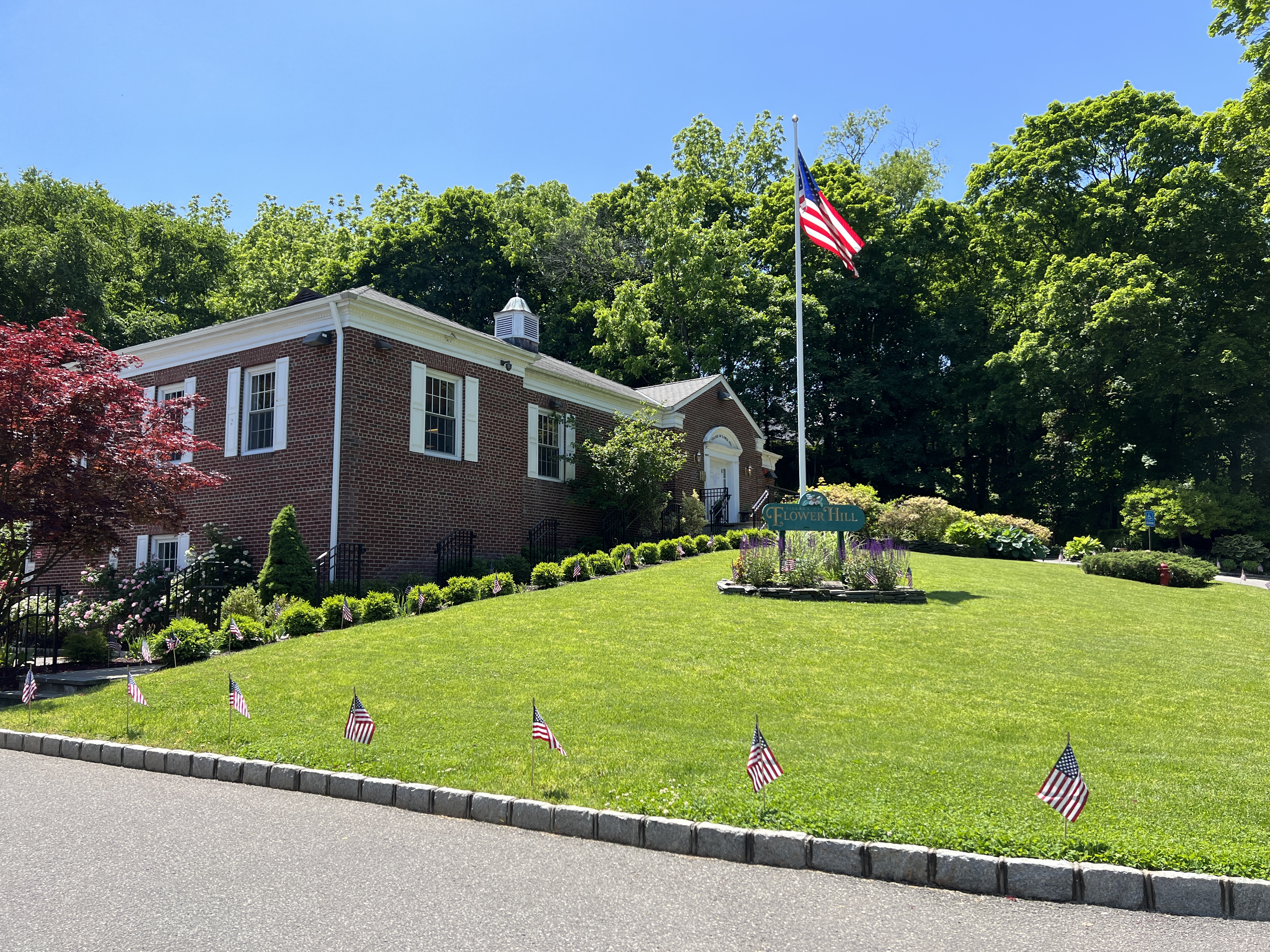
- Flower Hill Village Hall in 2023, with flags on the lawn to celebrate Memorial Day

- Official seal
- Nicknames: "FH"; "VFH"; "F. Hill"; "The Hill"
- Location in Nassau County and the state of New York

- Location on Long Island Location within the state of New York
- Coordinates: 40°48′21″N 73°40′29″W
- Country: United States
- State: New York
- County: Nassau
- Town: North Hempstead
- Incorporated: May 25, 1931
- Founder: Carlos W. Munson

Government
  - Mayor: Randall Rosenbaum
  - Deputy Mayor: Frank Genese
  - Trustees: List of Trustees: • Mary Jo Collins; • Claire Dorfman; • Max Frankel; • Frank Genese; • Gary Lewandowski; • Arthur J. Smith
  - Village Administrator: Marla Wolfson

Area
  - Total: 1.61 sq mi (4.18 km^{2})
  - Land: 1.61 sq mi (4.18 km^{2})
  - Water: 0 sq mi (0.00 km^{2})
- Elevation: 167 ft (51 m)

Population (2020)
  - Total: 4,794
  - Density: 2,974.0/sq mi (1,148.26/km^{2})
- Demonym(s): Flower Hiller; Manhassetonian; Port Washingtonian; Roslynian; Roslynite
- Time zone: UTC-5 (Eastern (EST))
  - Summer (DST): UTC-4 (EDT)
- ZIP Codes: 11030 (Manhasset); 11050 (Port Washington); 11576 (Roslyn)
- Area codes: 516, 363
- FIPS code: 36-26352
- GNIS feature ID: 0950308
- Website: www.villageflowerhill.gov

Flower Hill is a village in Nassau County, on the North Shore of Long Island, in New York, United States. The eastern half is considered part of the Greater Roslyn area, which is anchored by the Incorporated Village of Roslyn. Western and northern parts are more closely associated with Manhasset and Port Washington. The population was 4,794 at the time of the 2020 census.

Flower Hill is located entirely within the Town of North Hempstead, and has been recognized as a Tree City USA since 2013.

== History ==
=== Before the village (pre-colonization – 1930) ===
The location of what is today Flower Hill was originally inhabited by Matinecock Native Americans. In the 17th century, Dutch and English colonists began to settle the area.

This era saw members of prominent colonial families settle in the area, including members of the Hewlett family (the family after whom Hewlett, New York, and Hewlett Lane in Flower Hill are named). Members of the family settled in the area during this time, and constructed the former Hewlett Homestead circa 1713.

During this time, the area consisted of many farms, and was in an ideal location for them, as the goods produced in the area would be brought down to either Manhasset Bay in Manhasset or Port Washington, or to Hempstead Harbor in Roslyn for shipment to destinations in New York City and beyond.

At this time, the heart of Flower Hill was located where modern-day Port Washington Boulevard, Bonnie Heights Road, and Country Club Drive intersect. This area included a blacksmith, general store, tavern, a village well, and a cemetery, in addition to a small number of homes.

Circa 1900, Carlos Munson – the heir to the Munson Steamship Company – and his wife, Mabel, settled in Flower Hill. Carlos and Mabel Munson were unhappy to be living near so many intoxicated locals found in this area, which prompted Mabel asking Carlos to do something to get rid of them. Carlos responded by purchasing the land, despite having no need for it. To further eliminate this issue, the Munsons gave some of this land to the Franciscan Missionaries of Mary.

In the early decades of the 20th century, the New York & North Shore Traction Company operated a trolley line connecting Mineola, Roslyn, and Port Washington – as well as one connecting Flushing and Roslyn – through the village, utilizing Northern Boulevard, Middle Neck Road, and Port Washington Boulevard.

The two lines intersected at a junction located at the intersection of Middle Neck Road and Northern Boulevard. This was also the site of the company's former Roslyn trolley yard and a substation; it was located at the northwestern corner of the intersection.

Additionally, a trolley siding existed in Flower Hill on the east side of Port Washington Boulevard, near its intersection with modern-day Farmview Road.

=== Push for incorporation (1930 – 1931) ===
The push for Flower Hill's incorporation first started in 1930, when word was spread that Port Washington was planning to incorporate itself as a city. Upon hearing these rumors, residents of Flower Hill feared that the Flower Hill area would be placed within the boundaries of the proposed City of Greater Port Washington if those plans were ultimately to be approved. As a result, the residents of Flower Hill saw a need to incorporate the locality as a village, in order to prevent the area from becoming part of the rumored city.

After two unsuccessful attempts to hold a hearing on Flower Hill's incorporation as a village, residents tried for a third time in April 1931, and were successful. With the approval of the application for a hearing, a vote to decide whether or not Flower Hill should incorporate itself was set for April 27 of that year; the vote would be held in Carlos Munson's real estate office.

During the vote on April 27, the residents of Flower Hill voted unanimously in favor of incorporating Flower Hill as a village, and the Incorporated Village of Flower Hill was ultimately born.

=== Village of Flower Hill (1931 – present) ===
In May 1931, a few weeks after the birth of the village, its certificate of incorporation was signed. Carlos Munson was originally selected to serve as its first Mayor but turned down the position, which was subsequently given to Arthur G. Elvin. When founded, the population of Flower Hill was 288. The first village meeting took place in Carlos Munson's real estate office; Village Hall now occupies this parcel of land.

In the mid-1930s, the Franciscan Missionaries of Mary would establish St. Francis Hospital as a cardiac sanatorium for children, on the land given to them by Carlos Munson. The first children arrived at this facility on February 8, 1937.

Flower Hill started to see new housing developments built in the coming years. One of the most notable, early developments constructed during this period is the majority of the Flower Hill Estates development, which was built by Walter Uhl. Work on the development began along Country Club Drive – in the vicinity of the North Hempstead Country Club – in the latter half of the 1930s, before progressing southwards. Uhl built many of the homes in Flower Hill Estates in the colonial style, to ensure that they would fit in with existing buildings and surroundings. Some of these homes were also built with reused wood from nearby barns, which were incorporated into their ceiling designs. During the development's construction process in 1939, an old Spanish "piece-of-eight" was unearthed by a construction worker. The coin, dating back to 1793, was presented by Uhl to the Port Washington Public Library.

In the years and decades following the Second World War, Flower Hill continued to be suburbanized, and many new developments were built as a result. Many of these new developments were built over former estates (such as the Chanticlare at Flower Hill subdivision, which was built over the former estate of Jesse Ricks), farms (such as the Hewlett Farm subdivision, which was built over portions of the former Hewlett Homestead), and even former sand mines (such as certain parts of the Wildwood at Flower Hill development, built on land once owned by the Colonial Sand & Stone Company). A notable housing development built during this time is Flower Hill Country Estates, which was developed by Country Estates, Incorporated. The firm also built the Country Estates subdivision of nearby East Hills around the same time, over Clarence Mackay's former estate.

In 1946, Marjorie Church Logan (wife of William John Logan) was murdered in her home on Bonnie Heights Road – and her daughter, Marjory Jeanne, was shot and raped. The suspect, Ward Beecher Caraway, was a butler and chauffeur at another estate in Flower Hill, and was ultimately sentenced to death for the crimes.

In 1948, Flower Hill Village Hall was constructed. It was designed by Roslyn-based architect Henry W. Johanson, and is located where Carlos Munson's real estate office had previously stood; it opened in 1949.

The construction of so many new housing developments and homes in the village – and the subsequent influx of children – prompted the Roslyn Union Free School District to construct the Roslyn–Flower Hill Elementary School, to better serve the needs of the section of Flower Hill zoned for Roslyn's schools, as well as to resolve overcrowding at the district's other schools; this was one of several schools constructed in the district during this era. Built and opened in the early 1950s and sandwiched between the Wildwood and Broadridge developments, the Roslyn–Flower Hill Elementary School served the community until September 1980, when it was closed due to the declining enrollment numbers following the end of the baby-boom era. The former school's property was later subdivided to become the Mashady Estates subdivision in the 1980s, and now consists of multiple single-family homes; it was developed by the N & H Development Corporation.

The early 1950s saw Walter J. Black, Inc. – at the time the nation's second-largest book advertiser – move its corporate headquarters from New York City to an office building along Northern Boulevard in Flower Hill.

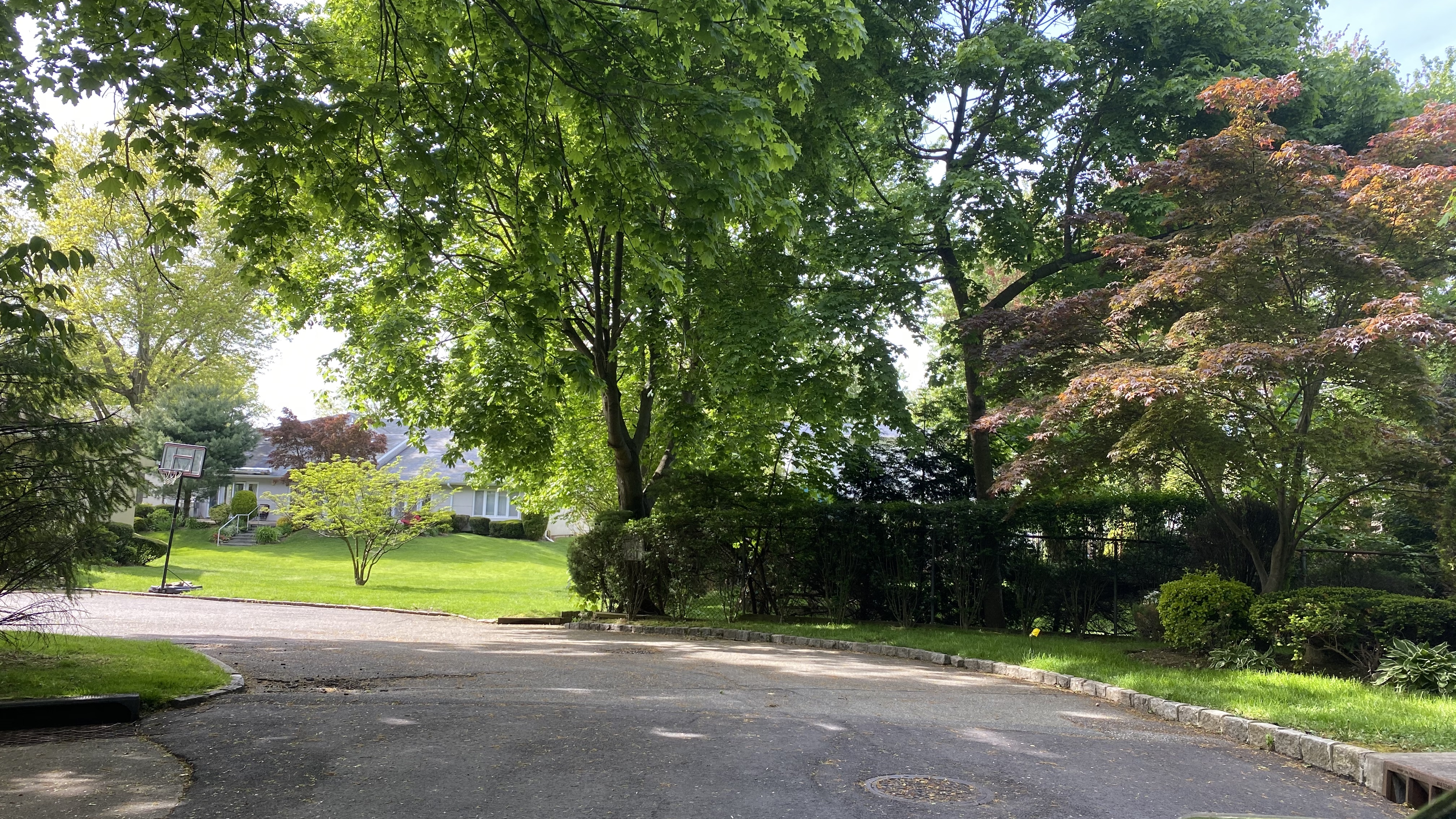
The former site of the Roslyn–Flower Hill Elementary School in 2020

Between 2012 and 2016, Elaine Phillips served as the mayor of Flower Hill. She served in this capacity until being elected to the New York State Senate in November 2016. The Phillips Administration oversaw the rehabilitation and modernization of the village-owned Flower Hill Park, which included the installation of a state-of-the-art playground for children.

On October 29, 2012, Hurricane Sandy made landfall, and caused widespread damage throughout the New York metropolitan area. The entirety of the Village of Flower Hill lost power as a result of this storm. Due to communication errors from the Long Island Power Authority, some residents were without power for two unusually cold weeks. Village officials kept Village Hall open despite the fact that telephone lines and the heating system were initially down. Village officials also regularly reached out to LIPA and local residents, and assisted in removing downed trees. Some officials even checked in on every senior living alone in the village, also offering them free transportation to and from shelters and ensuring that they were stocked with food. When the generators for Village Hall started to run, village officials started offering residents with heat, power, and even coffee at the building. There were no storm-related fatalities in Flower Hill, and only one home was lost within the village, when its generator caught fire.

In response to all of the trees lost in Flower Hill due to Hurricane Sandy, the village created a tree planting program, through which residents could receive a free tree for their property, given that it is planted within the village's right-of-way. This program helped the village become recognized as a Tree City USA.

Robert McNamara became Mayor in 2016, succeeding Senator Phillips. A notable accomplishment of the McNamara Administration was the initiation of the process of the village's takeover of Middle Neck Road (former CR D55) – which connects Northern and Port Washington Boulevards – from Nassau County; this had been a goal of the village's for several years, given the poor upkeep from the Nassau County Department of Public Works. In the deal, Nassau County would repair and repave the road, thence sell it to Flower Hill for $1. Prior to this transfer, the village had purchased the Flower Hill Park and the segment of Stonytown Road within its borders from Nassau County. McNamara's administration also implemented a construction impact fee for large construction projects within the village.

McNamara, who long-suffered from health complications, died on April 15, 2020. Then-Deputy Mayor Brian Herrington subsequently assumed the duties of Mayor, in light of McNamara's passing.

On August 4, 2020, Hurricane Isaias struck the New York metropolitan area as a strong tropical storm, causing widespread power outages and damage across the region. Many trees in Flower Hill were uprooted, and much of the village lost power. Due to communication errors from PSEG Long Island, many delays took place in restoring power to the entirety of the village, resulting in some residents being without power for more than a week. Village officials designated Village Hall as a cooling center and phone charging center for residents that were without power, following COVID-19 social distancing guidelines.

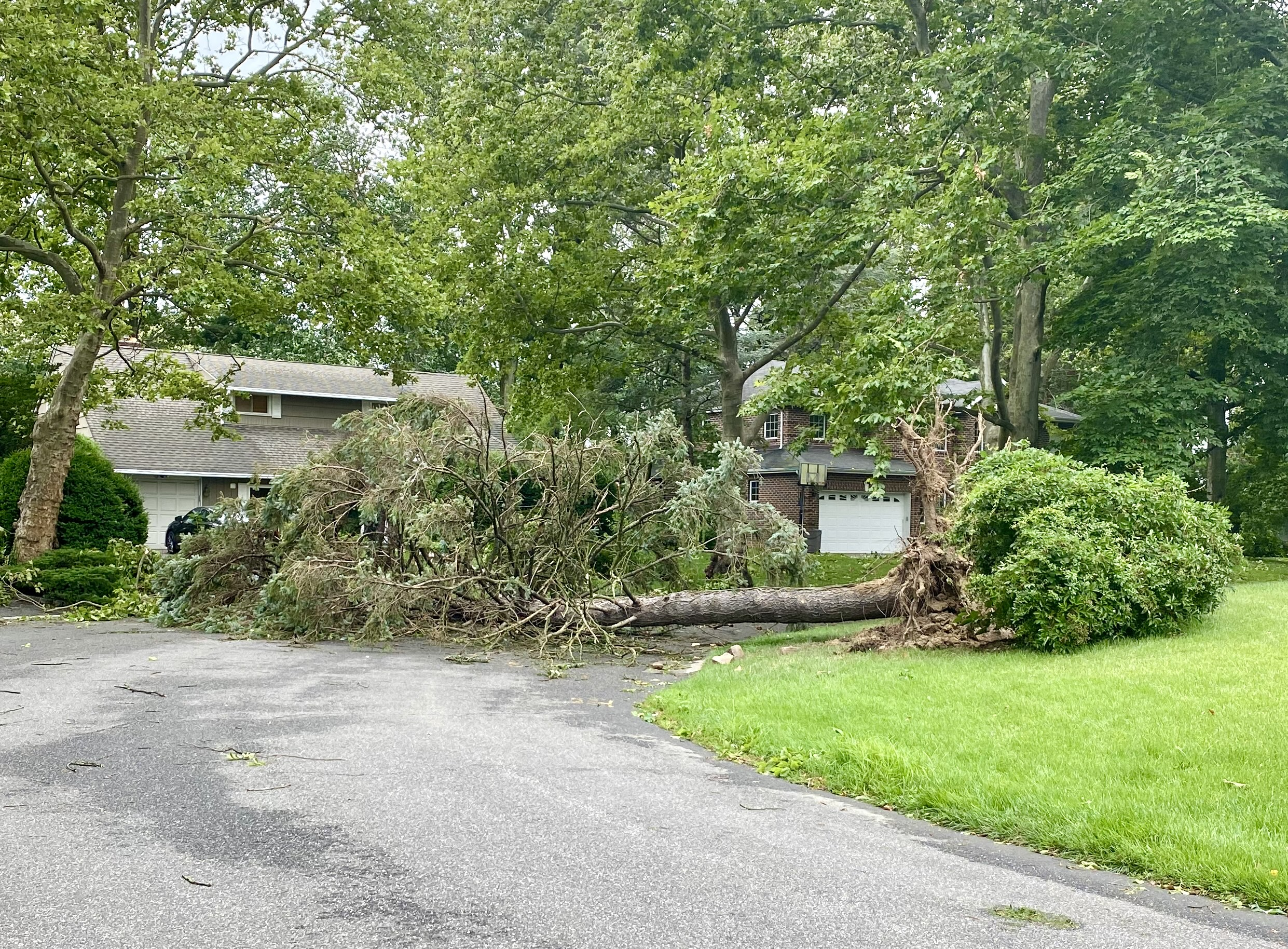
A downed tree on Sycamore Drive following Tropical Storm Isaias

The 2020 mayoral election was supposed to take place on March 18, 2020 – but was postponed first until April 28 and then again until September, due to an order signed by Governor Andrew M. Cuomo as a result of COVID-19. The election ultimately took place on Tuesday, September 15, 2020. The election, which was highly contested, saw then-Trustee Kate Hirsch challenging incumbent Mayor Brian Herrington. Herrington was ultimately re-elected by Flower Hill voters to serve a full term, defeating Hirsch; Herrington received 596 votes, and Hirsch received 233.

On February 23, 2021, the Arbor Day Foundation designated Flower Hill as a Tree City USA for the seventh consecutive year.

In early 2022, ownership of Middle Neck Road was officially transferred to the Village from Nassau County.

In 2023, the Village of Flower Hill created a gallery at Village Hall, known as the Flower Hill Village Historical Gallery. The gallery covers the history of Flower Hill and the surrounding areas.

In 2026, the village created a new park on Ridge Drive West, known as Desmond Gallagher Flower Hill Veterans Memorial Park. The park was created as part of the village's observance of the United States Semiquincentennial and houses to the village's official veterans memorial.

== Geography ==
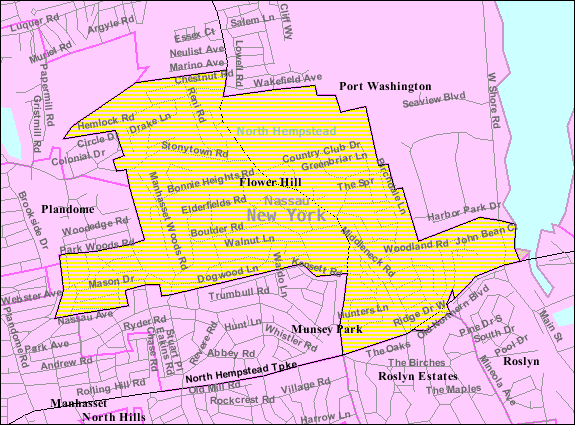
U.S. Census map of Flower Hill

According to the United States Census Bureau, the village has a total area of 1.6 square miles (4.1 km^{2}), all land.

Additionally, Flower Hill is located on the southern portion of the Cow Neck Peninsula.

At 40º48' N, Flower Hill is located at roughly the same latitude as Canton, Ohio, Lincoln, Nebraska, Madrid, Spain, Aomori, Japan, Goshogawara, Japan, and Naples, Italy.

=== Topography ===
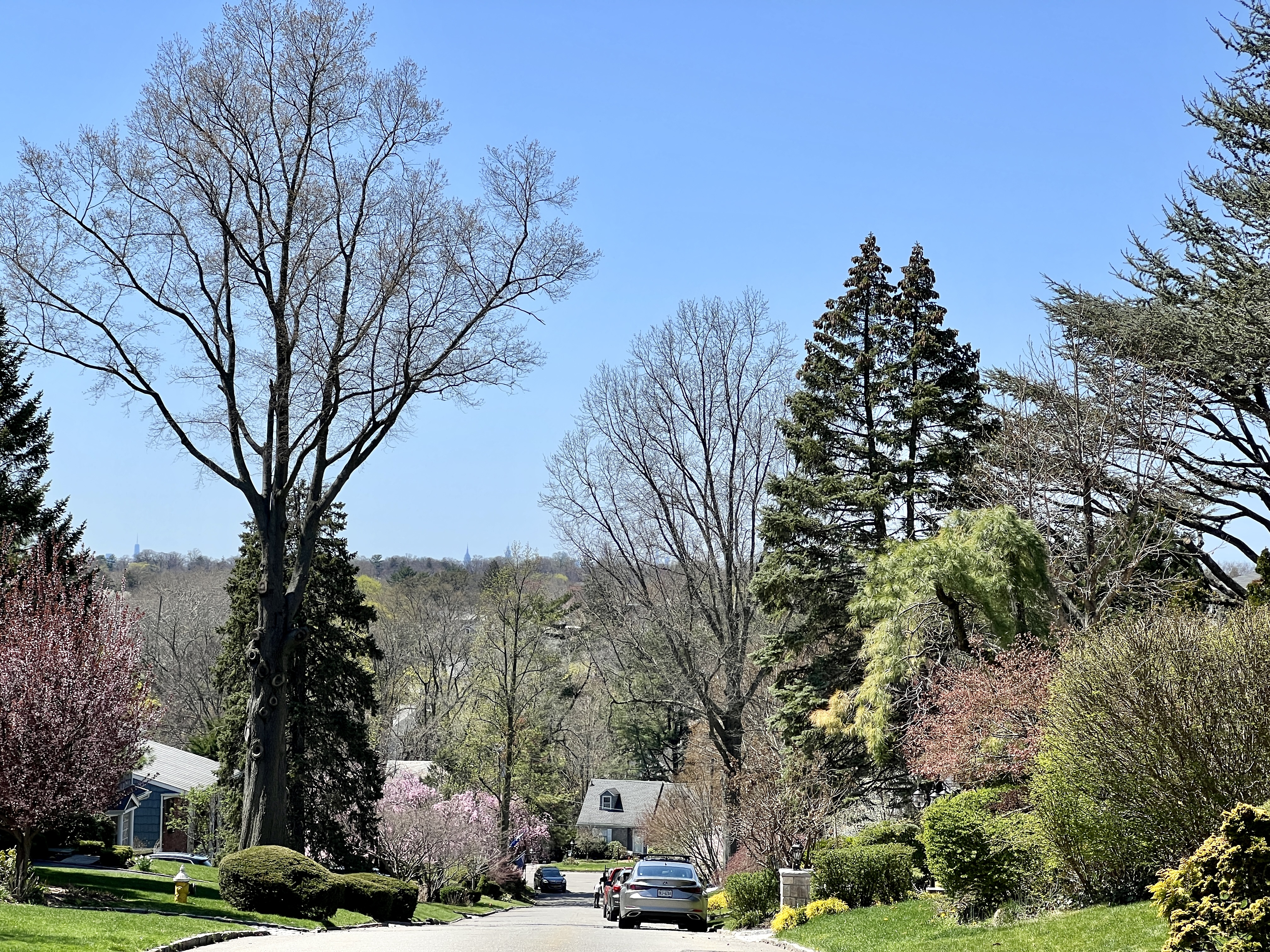
Mason's Overlook on Colony Lane in 2022, with the Empire State Building and New York skyline visible in the distance

Like the rest of Long Island's North Shore, Flower Hill is situated on a terminal moraine, known as the Harbor Hill Moraine. This moraine was formed by glaciers during the Wisconsin Glacial Episode, and is named for Harbor Hill in Roslyn; Harbor Hill is the highest geographic point in Nassau County.

Some of the hills in Flower Hill reach elevations high enough that on a clear day, the skyline of New York City can easily be seen from the ground – most notably in the Manhasset portion of the village.

The highest point in Flower Hill is on Ridge Drive East, at 219 feet (67 m). The lowest point is Hempstead Harbor, which is at sea level. Both the highest and lowest points in Flower Hill are within the portion of the village served by the Roslyn Post Office.

=== Geology ===
Flower Hill is the namesake of the Flower Hill sand – a geologic unit of the Manhasset Formation.

=== Drainage ===
An interactive map showing the watersheds in the Village of Flower Hill and their approximate boundaries.

Flower Hill is split among three minor drainage areas: Inner Hempstead Harbor (part of the Hempstead Harbor Watershed), Leeds Pond, and Whitney Pond (both of which are part of the Manhasset Bay Watershed).

Furthermore, the village, as a whole, is located within the larger Long Island Sound/Atlantic Ocean Watershed.

=== Climate ===
The Village of Flower Hill features a humid subtropical climate (Cfa) under the Köppen climate classification and is located near the transitional zone between humid subtropical and humid continental (Dfa) climates. Accordingly, the village experiences hot, humid summers and cold winters, and experiences precipitation throughout the entirety of the year.

Climate data for Flower Hill, New York, 1991–2020 normals, extremes 1999–present
Month	Jan	Feb	Mar	Apr	May	Jun	Jul	Aug	Sep	Oct	Nov	Dec	Year
Record high °F (°C)	71 (22)	73 (23)	87 (31)	94 (34)	97 (36)	101 (38)	108 (42)	105 (41)	97 (36)	89 (32)	83 (28)	76 (24)	108 (42)
Mean daily maximum °F (°C)	40.4 (4.7)	42.9 (6.1)	51.1 (10.6)	61.2 (16.2)	70.6 (21.4)	79.6 (26.4)	84.5 (29.2)	83.3 (28.5)	76.0 (24.4)	65.4 (18.6)	55.7 (13.2)	45.1 (7.3)	63.0 (17.2)
Daily mean °F (°C)	33.4 (0.8)	35.0 (1.7)	42.0 (5.6)	51.8 (11.0)	60.8 (16.0)	70.1 (21.2)	75.2 (24.0)	74.1 (23.4)	67.2 (19.6)	56.5 (13.6)	47.8 (8.8)	38.2 (3.4)	54.3 (12.4)
Mean daily minimum °F (°C)	26.4 (−3.1)	27.1 (−2.7)	33.5 (0.8)	42.4 (5.8)	51.0 (10.6)	60.6 (15.9)	65.8 (18.8)	65.0 (18.3)	58.3 (14.6)	47.6 (8.7)	39.9 (4.4)	31.2 (−0.4)	45.7 (7.6)
Record low °F (°C)	−4 (−20)	−5 (−21)	5 (−15)	13 (−11)	34 (1)	43 (6)	50 (10)	46 (8)	36 (2)	27 (−3)	17 (−8)	−2 (−19)	−5 (−21)
Average precipitation inches (mm)	3.56 (90)	2.87 (73)	4.47 (114)	3.85 (98)	3.23 (82)	3.54 (90)	3.97 (101)	4.26 (108)	4.31 (109)	4.08 (104)	3.18 (81)	3.99 (101)	45.31 (1,151)
Average snowfall inches (cm)	5.5 (14)	7.8 (20)	3.7 (9.4)	0.3 (0.76)	0 (0)	0 (0)	0 (0)	0 (0)	0 (0)	0 (0)	0.2 (0.51)	5.7 (14)	23.2 (58.67)
Average precipitation days	8	9.1	11.4	14.3	16.5	17.4	18	16.8	13.4	13.1	8.8	11.7	158.5
Average snowy days	4.6	4.7	2.9	0.3	0	0	0	0	0	0.1	0.5	2.7	15.8
Average relative humidity (%)	73	75	72	72	75	74	73	71	73	73	71	75	73
Mean monthly sunshine hours	177	153	172	167	202	213	237	241	215	190	210	171	2,348
Mean daily daylight hours	9.6	10.7	12.0	13.3	14.5	15.1	14.8	13.8	12.5	11.1	9.9	9.3	12.2
Average ultraviolet index	2	2	2	3	5	6	6	6	5	3	2	2	4
Source: NOAA; Weather Atlas; The Weather Channel

==== Plant zone ====
According to the United States Department of Agriculture (USDA), Flower Hill is located within hardiness zone 7b.

== Demographics ==
Historical population
Census	Pop.	Note	%±
1940	666		—
1950	1,948		192.5%
1960	4,594		135.8%
1970	4,486		−2.4%
1980	4,558		1.6%
1990	4,490		−1.5%
2000	4,508		0.4%
2010	4,665		3.5%
2020	4,794		2.8%
U.S. Decennial Census

=== Racial and ethnic composition ===
Flower Hill village, New York – Racial and ethnic composition Note: the US Census treats Hispanic/Latino as an ethnic category. This table excludes Latinos from the racial categories and assigns them to a separate category. Hispanics/Latinos may be of any race.
Race / Ethnicity (NH = Non-Hispanic)	Pop 2000	Pop 2010	Pop 2020	% 2000	% 2010	% 2020
White alone (NH)	3,726	3,670	3,423	82.65%	78.67%	71.40%
Black or African American alone (NH)	46	34	32	1.02%	0.73%	0.67%
Native American or Alaska Native alone (NH)	0	0	7	0.00%	0.00%	0.15%
Asian alone (NH)	465	591	904	10.31%	12.67%	18.86%
Native Hawaiian or Pacific Islander alone (NH)	0	0	0	0.00%	0.00%	0.00%
Other race alone (NH)	6	7	29	0.13%	0.15%	0.60%
Mixed race or Multiracial (NH)	84	92	119	1.86%	1.97%	2.48%
Hispanic or Latino (any race)	181	271	280	4.02%	5.81%	5.84%
Total	4,508	4,665	4,794	100.00%	100.00%	100.00%

=== 2020 census ===
As of the 2020 United States census, Flower Hill had a population of 4,794. The median age was 43.1 years. 25.8% of residents were under the age of 18 and 17.4% of residents were 65 years of age or older. For every 100 females, there were 95.7 males, and for every 100 females age 18 and over there were 94.5 males age 18 and over.

100.0% of residents lived in urban areas, while 0.0% lived in rural areas.

There were 1,473 households in Flower Hill, of which 43.6% had children under the age of 18 living in them. Of all households, 78.3% were married-couple households, 7.5% were households with a male householder and no spouse or partner present, and 12.3% were households with a female householder and no spouse or partner present. About 8.9% of all households were made up of individuals and 6.5% had someone living alone who was 65 years of age or older.

There were 1,529 housing units, of which 3.7% were vacant. The homeowner vacancy rate was 1.2% and the rental vacancy rate was 0.0%.

==== Income and poverty ====
As of the 2020 census, median household income was $234,702. About 3.1% of the population was below the poverty line, including 0.6% of those under age 18 and 16.8% of those age 65 or over.

Additionally, 4.2% of Flower Hill residents were veterans of the armed forces.

=== 2010 census ===
As of the 2010 United States census, there were 4,665 people, 1,444 households, and 1,322 families in Flower Hill, and there were 1,597 housing units. The racial makeup of the village was 80.8% White, 5.1% African American, 0.0% Native American, 13.7% Asian, 0.0% from other races, and 0.3% from two or more races. Hispanic or Latino of any race were 3.7% of the population.

Of the 1,444 households, 52.1% had children under the age of 18 living with them, 85.4% were married couples living together, 5.5% had a female householder with no husband present, 0.7% had a female householder with no husband present, and 8.4% were non-families. 7.5% of households were one person, and 3.9% were one person aged 65 or older. The average household size was 3.19 and the average family size was 3.35.

The median age was 41.5 years. For every 100 females, there were 105.2 males.

The median household income was $195,833 and the median family income was $202,895. Males had a median income of $160,242 versus $67,188 for females. About 1.7% of families were below the poverty line.

=== 2000 census ===
As of the 2000 United States census, there were 4,508 people, 1,477 households, and 1,271 families in Flower Hill. The population density was 2,790.2 inhabitants per square mile (1,077.3/km^{2}). There were 1,514 housing units at an average density of 937.1 per square mile (361.8/km^{2}). The racial makeup of the village was 85.65% White, 1.04% African American, 0.02% Native American, 10.31% Asian, 0.98% from other races, and 2.00% from two or more races. Hispanic or Latino of any race were 4.02% of the population.

Of the 1,477 households, 39.3% had children under the age of 18 living with them, 78.1% were married couples living together, 5.9% had a female householder with no husband present, and 13.9% were non-families. 11.8% of households were one person, and 6.9% were one person aged 65 or older. The average household size was 3.03 and the average family size was 3.29.

The age distribution was 26.1% under the age of 18, 5.8% from 18 to 24, 22.8% from 25 to 44, 29.0% from 45 to 64, and 16.3% 65 or older. The median age was 42 years. For every 100 females, there were 94.9 males. For every 100 females age 18 and over, there were 91.2 males.

The median household income was $121,999 and the median family income was $133,075. Males had a median income of $100,000 versus $49,688 for females. The per capita income for the village was $64,997. About 2.0% of families and 2.9% of the population were below the poverty line, including 1.7% of those under age 18 and 3.5% of those age 65 or over.

As of 2000, Flower Hill had the 8th largest Iranian population in the United States – behind Great Neck Plaza, New York and ahead of Roslyn, New York – with 7.5% of Flower Hill's population reporting Iranian Jewish ancestry.

== Economy ==
Flower Hill is a bedroom community of the City of New York. As such, a significant number of Flower Hill residents commute to/from New York for work.

The village itself is predominantly residential in character, with the heavy majority of residential lots within the village being zoned for single-family homes. The village has a business district at its southern end, along Northern Boulevard, Middle Neck Road, and Port Washington Boulevard; this is where the heavy majority of businesses within the village are located.

Among the businesses located there is the Landmark Diner, which was rebuilt in 2009 as what its owners described as the first prefabricated double-decker diner in the United States.

The largest employer in Flower Hill is St. Francis Hospital, located off Port Washington Boulevard near the center of the village. As of 2021, the hospital employed approximately 3,573 people, also making it the third-largest employer overall within the Town of North Hempstead.

== Arts and culture ==
Flower Hill is home to The Art Guild – an arts center located at the Elderfields Preserve. The village also maintains a museum at Flower Hill Village Hall – known as the Flower Hill Village Historical Gallery, which highlights the history of the village.

The village is also home to the Cow Neck Peninsula Historical Society, which is headquartered in the historic Sands-Willets Homestead. It is one of two main historical societies serving Flower Hill – the other being the Roslyn Landmark Society, headquartered in Roslyn.

== Government ==
=== Village government ===
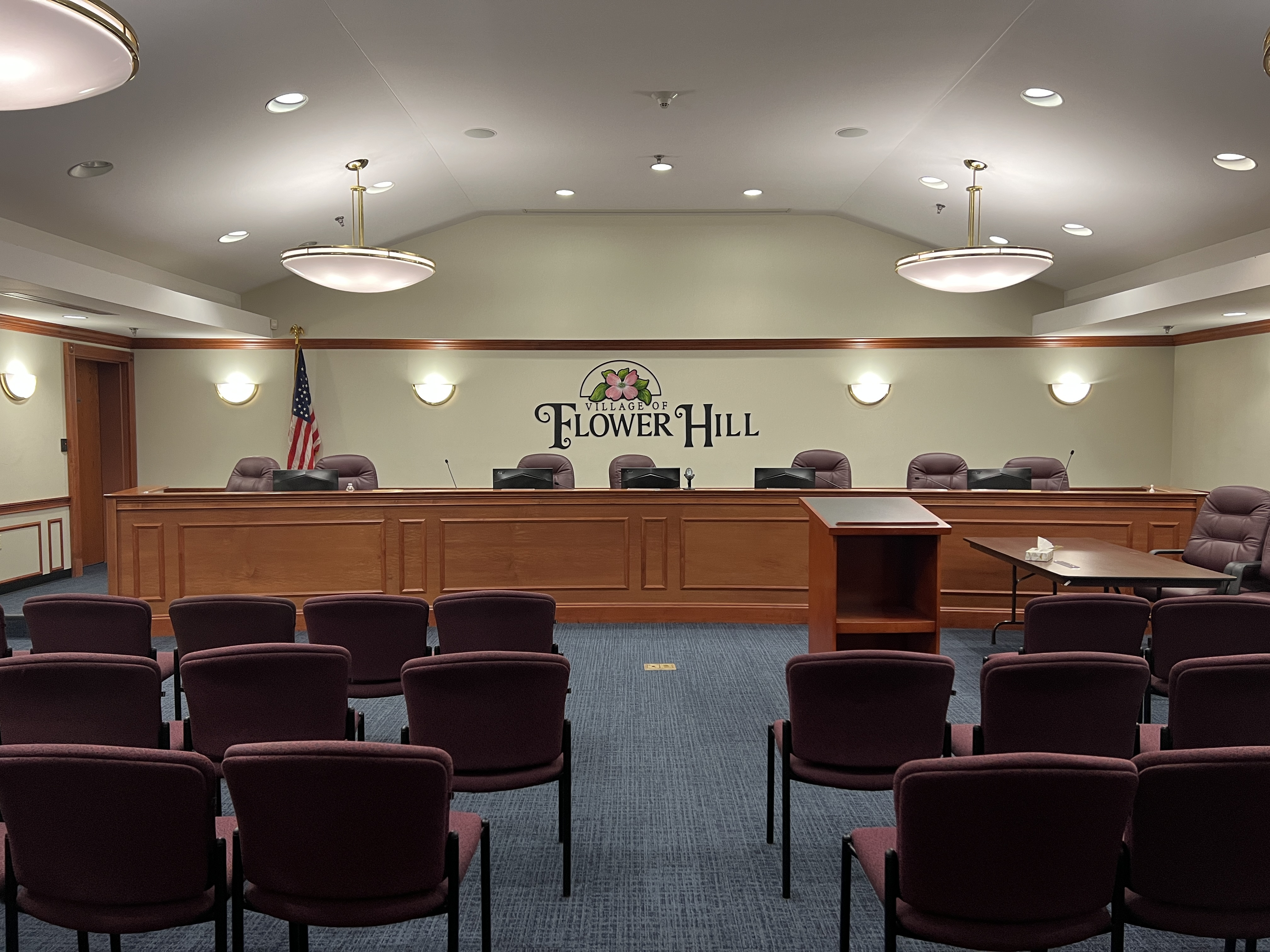
The meeting room inside Flower Hill Village Hall in 2023

The Village of Flower Hill is governed by the seven-member Village of Flower Hill Board of Trustees, consisting of an elected mayor and six elected trustees; one trustee is selected each year to additionally serve as the deputy mayor. All seven members of the Board of Trustees are elected at-large to serve two-year terms and are unpaid.

As of April 2026, the mayor of Flower Hill is Randall Rosenbaum.

The following is a list of Flower Hill's mayors, from 1931 to present:

Mayors of Flower Hill:
Mayor's name	Year(s) in office
Arthur G. Elvin	1931
W. John Logan	1931–1937
Stephen H. Mason	1937–1940
Julien T. Davies	1940–1944
Edward Q. Carr	1944–1950
Lawrence R. Bradley	1950–1951
Ralph B. Menke	1951–1957
Harold S. Shouse	1957–1962
John E. Mahoney	1962–1963
Benjamin Heller	1963–1970
George B. Higgins	1970–1974
Louis B. Resnick	1974–1981
Raymond W. Tekverk	1981–1988
John W. Walter	1988–1996
Derrick A. Rubin	1996–1998
James L. Damascus	1998–2005
Charles W. Weiss	2005–2012
Elaine Phillips	2012–2016
Robert McNamara	2016–2020
Brian Herrington	2020–2022
Randall Rosenbaum	2022–Present

=== Representation in higher government ===
On the town level, Flower Hill is located entirely within the Town of North Hempstead's 6th council district, which as of April 2026 is represented on the North Hempstead Town Council by Mariann Dalimonte (D–Port Washington).

On the county level, Flower Hill is located entirely within Nassau County's 10th Legislative district, which as of April 2026 is represented in the Nassau County Legislature by Mazi Melesa Pilip (R–Great Neck).

On the state level, Flower Hill is located entirely within New York's 16th State Assembly district and 7th State Senate district, which as of April 2026 are represented by Daniel J. Norber (R–Great Neck) and Jack M. Martins (R–Old Westbury).

On the federal level, Flower Hill is located entirely within New York's 3rd Congressional district, which as of April 2026 is represented in the United States Congress by Thomas R. Suozzi (D–Glen Cove). Like the rest of New York, it is represented in the United States Senate by Kirsten E. Gillibrand (D) and Charles E. Schumer (D).

=== Politics ===
Flower Hill is located within the 59th, 60th, 61st, and 62nd election districts of New York's 16th State Assembly district – all four of which are located entirely within the village:

In the 2024 U.S. presidential election, the majority of Flower Hill's voters voted for Donald J. Trump (R).

== Parks and recreation ==
- Flower Hill Village Park – A village-owned park in the center of Flower Hill.
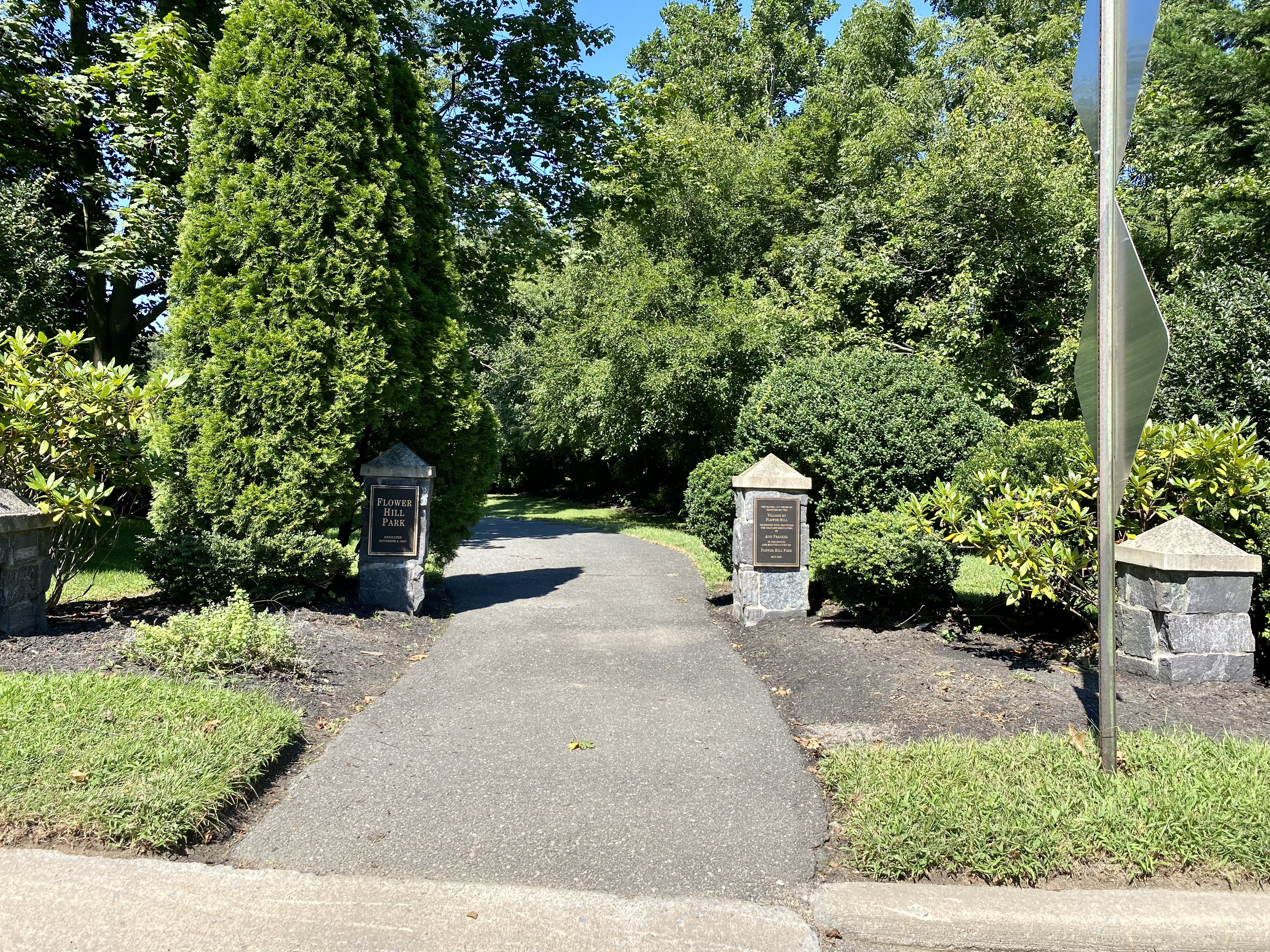
  An entrance to the Flower Hill Village Park in 2021
- Desmond Gallagher Flower Hill Veterans Memorial Park – A village-owned park, located in the southeastern part of the village; contains the village's veterans memorial.
- Elderfields Preserve – A historic farm, museum, art gallery, and nature preserve near the center of the village; owned by Nassau County.

Flower Hill also features and maintains several smaller park strips throughout the village, in addition to a history gallery and network of walking tours pertaining to the history of the village.

Additionally, the North Hempstead Country Club – A private country club – is located in the northeastern part of the village.

Furthermore, the portion of Flower Hill zoned for the Manhasset Union Free School District is located within the boundaries of (and is thus served by) the Manhasset Park District. This special district owns and operates numerous parks and parking facilities throughout the Greater Manhasset area.

== Education ==
=== Schools ===
==== Public school districts ====
An interactive map showing the service areas and boundaries for each school district within the Village of Flower Hill.

The Incorporated Village of Flower Hill is located within the boundaries of (and is thus served by) the Manhasset Union Free School District, the Port Washington Union Free School District, and the Roslyn Union Free School District. Accordingly, children who reside within Flower Hill attend public school in one of these three districts, depending on where they reside within the village.

Additionally, the Roslyn Union Free School District's former Roslyn–Flower Hill Elementary School was located within the section of the village zoned for Roslyn's schools.

==== Private education ====
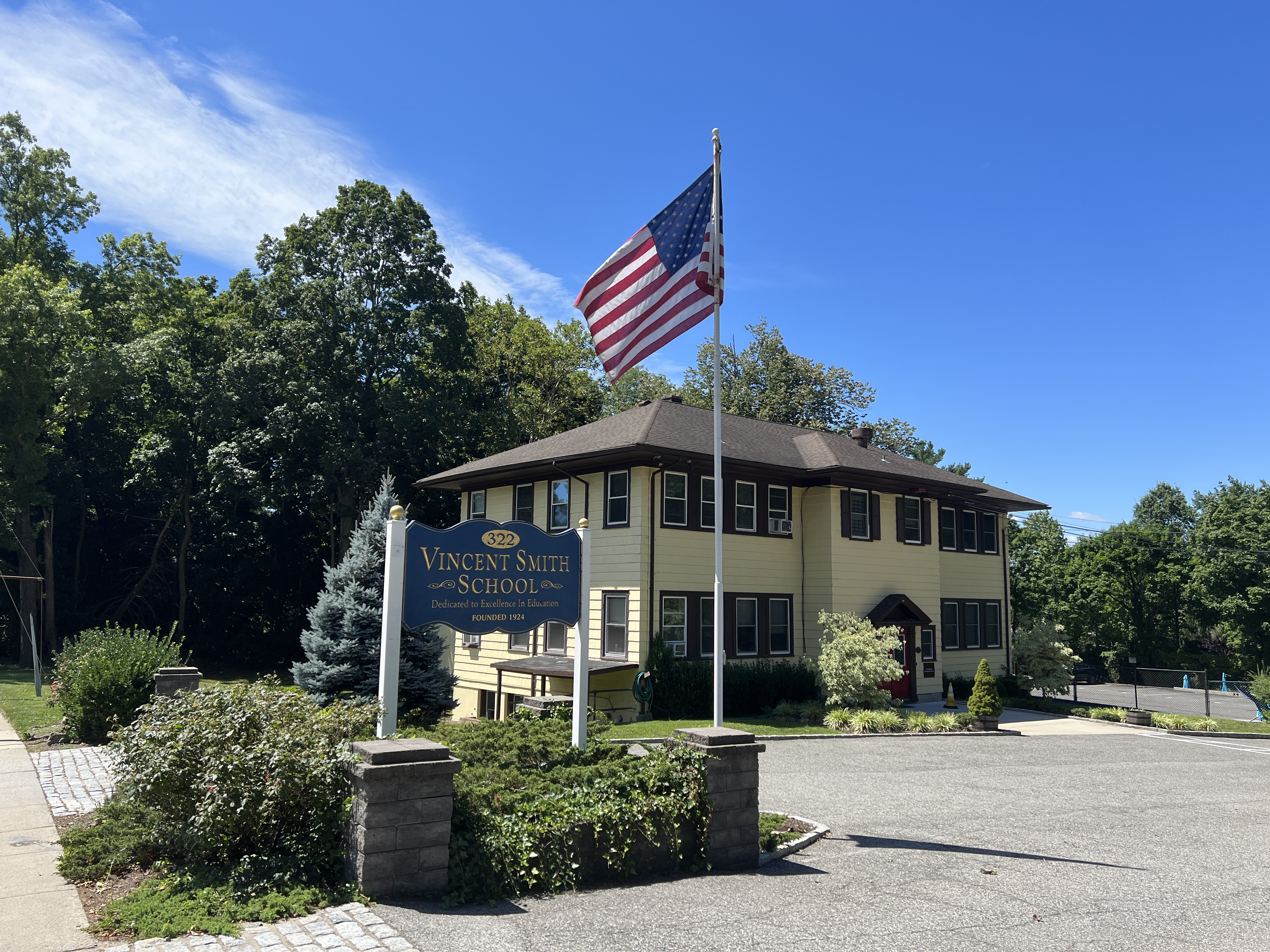
The Vincent Smith School in 2023

One private school – the Vincent Smith School – is located within Flower Hill. This school is located off Port Washington Boulevard and serves students in grades one through 12.

=== Library districts ===
Flower Hill is served by three library districts – the boundaries of which correspond with the school district boundaries:

- The Bryant Library (Roslyn) – Serves the section of the village zoned for the Roslyn UFSD, through the Bryant Library.
- The Manhasset Library District – Serves the section of the village zoned for the Manhasset UFSD, through the Manhasset Public Library.
- The Port Washington Library District – Serves the section of the village zoned for the Port Washington UFSD, through the Port Washington Public Library.

All three libraries are members of the Nassau Library System.

== Media ==
=== Newspapers ===
Flower Hill has three newspapers of record: The Manhasset Press–Times, The Port Washington News–Times, and The Roslyn News–Times. All three of these papers are owned by Schneps Media.

Other major newspapers serving Flower Hill include Newsday, the New York Post, The New York Times, and The Wall Street Journal.

=== Television ===
According to the Federal Communications Commission, Flower Hill – like all other communities on Long Island – is located within (and is thus served by) the New York, NY Television Market Area.

==== Public-access television ====
Flower Hill is one of North Shore TV's fourteen member villages. North Shore TV provides Flower Hill and the other member villages with public-access television programming, through Optimum and Verizon Fios – the main cable television providers in the area.

== Infrastructure ==
=== Transportation ===
==== Road ====
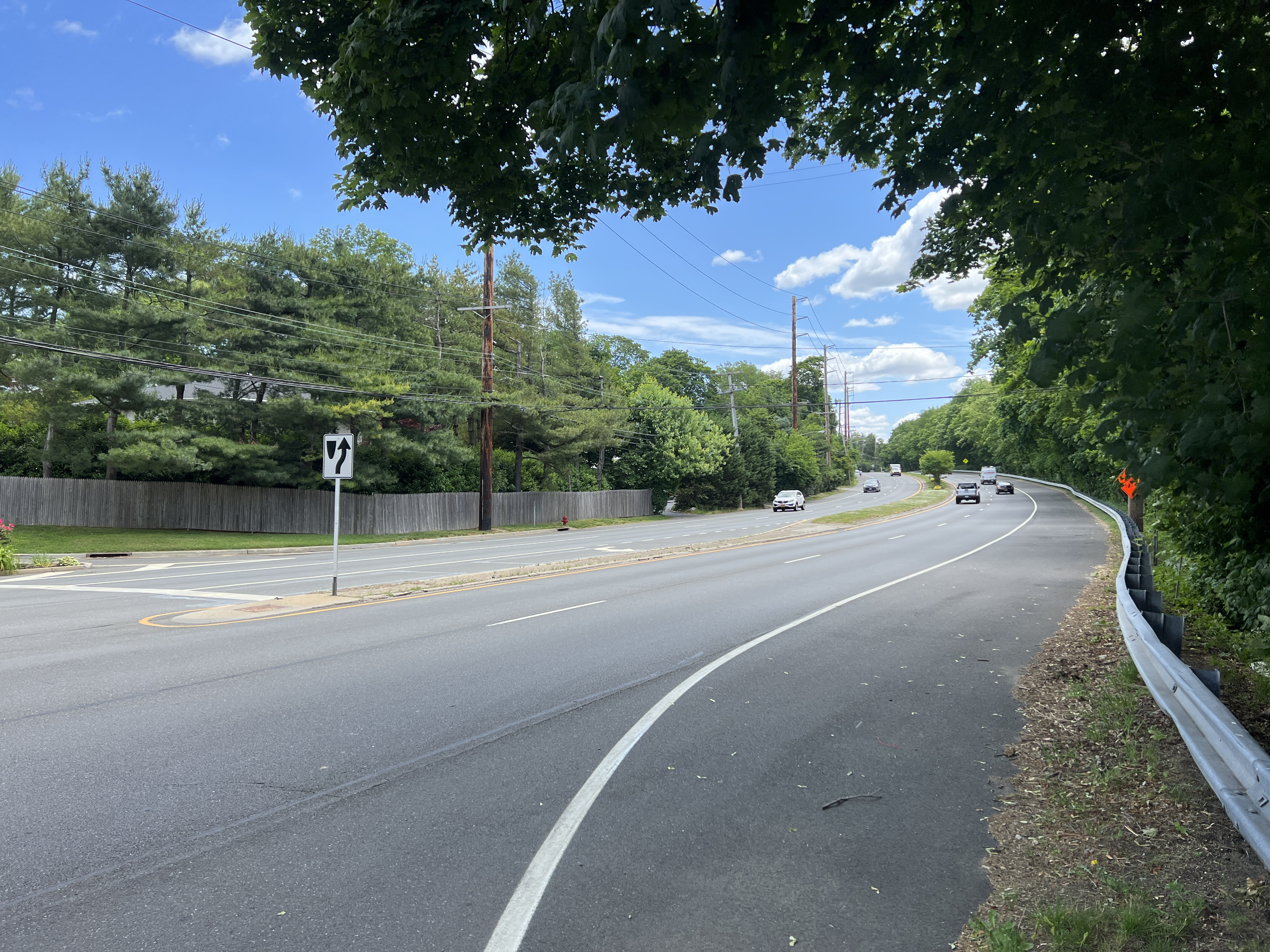
Port Washington Boulevard (NY 101) in Flower Hill in 2023, looking south from Bonnie Heights Road

Two state-owned roads pass through and serve the village:

- Northern Boulevard (NY 25A) – Forms portions of Flower Hill's southern border, with Roslyn and Roslyn Estates.
- Port Washington Boulevard (NY 101) – Forms a portion of the Flower Hill – Munsey Park border, in addition to forming a portion of the Flower Hill – Port Washington border.

Other major roads which are located within (or pass through) the Village of Flower Hill include Bridge Road, Manhasset Woods Road, Middle Neck Road, Mineola Avenue (CR E64), Old Northern Boulevard (CR D71), Stonytown Road, and West Shore Road (CR 15).

Additionally, the western end of the William Cullen Bryant Viaduct, which carries NY 25A over Hempstead Harbor and the Village of Roslyn's downtown area, is located in Flower Hill.

==== Rail ====
While there are no Long Island Rail Road stations located within the village limits, the Port Washington Branch does form portions of the Manhasset – Flower Hill and Plandome Manor – Flower Hill borders.

The nearest stations to the village are Manhasset, Plandome, and Port Washington on the Port Washington Branch, as well as the Roslyn station on the Oyster Bay Branch.

==== Bus ====
Flower Hill is served by the n20H, n20X, n21, and n23 bus routes – all of which are operated by Nassau Inter-County Express (NICE). These four bus routes travel through the area via Northern Boulevard and Old Northern Boulevard, along the southern border of Flower Hill. The n23 also travels along Port Washington Boulevard, through the heart of the village.

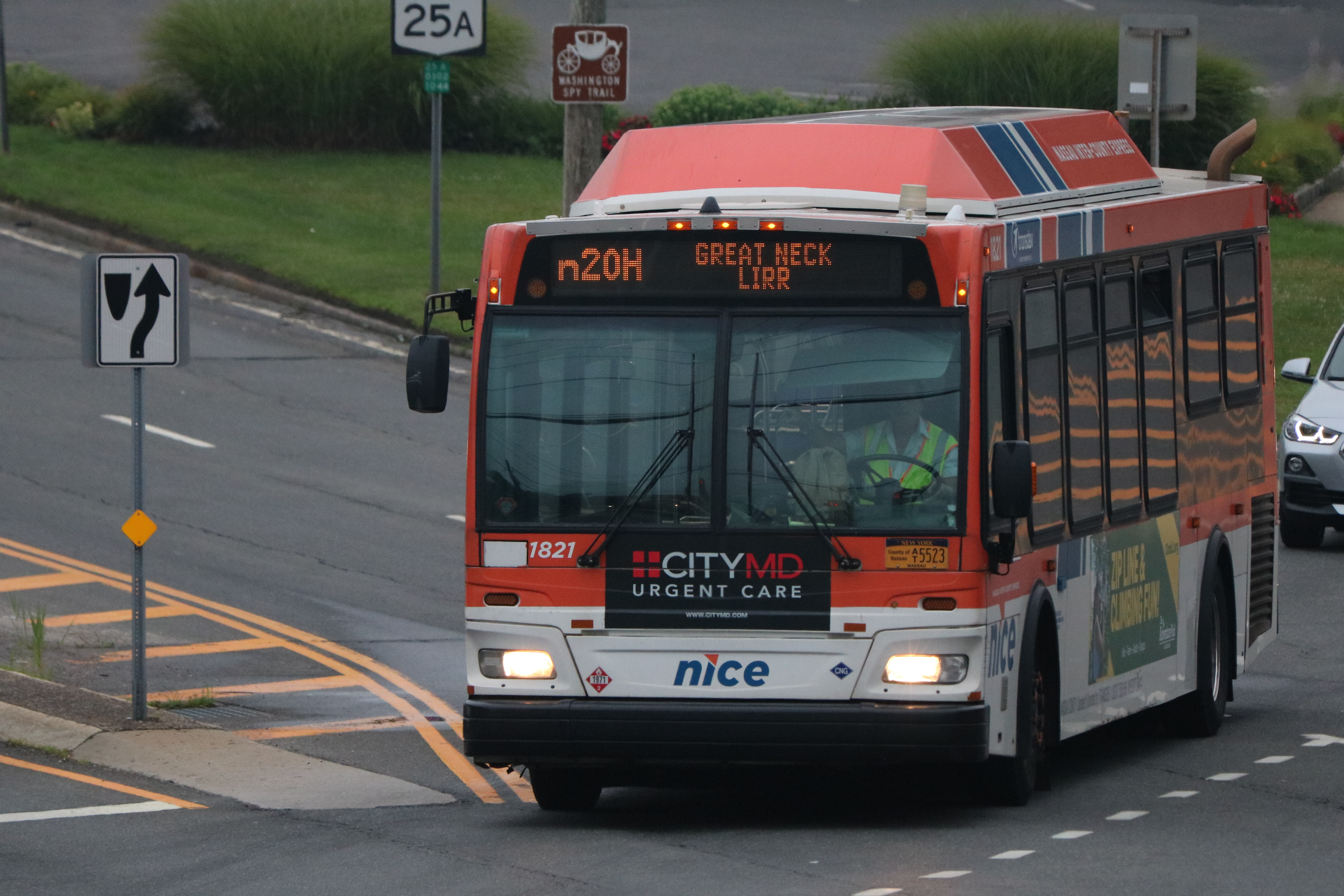
A westbound n20H bus turning onto Northern Boulevard from Old Northern Boulevard in Flower Hill

Additionally, NICE's Port Washington Shuttle (connecting the downtown areas of Port Washington and Roslyn, as well as the Port Washington LIRR station) traverses West Shore Road on the southeastern edge of Flower Hill between the two communities – though it makes no stops within village limits.

==== Historic trolley line ====
Between the 1900s and the 1920s, the Port Washington Line of the New York and North Shore Traction Company, ran between Mineola and Port Washington, via Roslyn. This trolley line crossed through the village, utilizing Northern Boulevard, Middle Neck Road, and Port Washington Boulevard.

Additionally, the North Shore Line of the New York and North Shore Traction Company trolley line ran from Flushing to Roslyn, and connected with the Port Washington Line at the intersection of Middle Neck Road and Northern Boulevard.

Furthermore, a New York and North Shore Traction Company trolley yard, known as the Roslyn Trolley Yard, existed at the northwestern corner of Northern Boulevard and Middle Neck Road, with one of the system's electrical substations being located adjacent to it.

=== Utility services ===
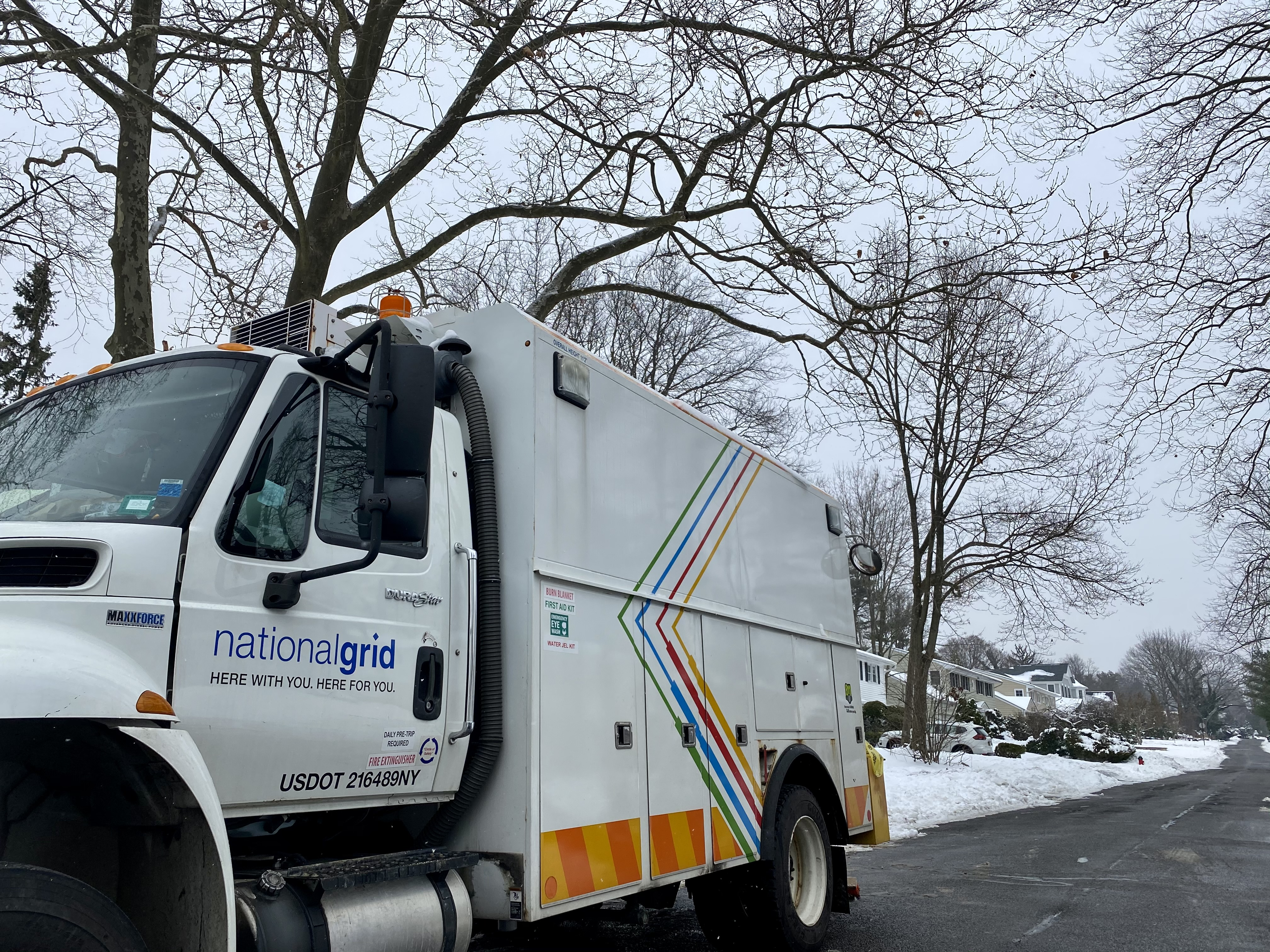
A National Grid truck on Chestnut Road in 2020

==== Natural gas ====
National Grid provides natural gas to all properties within the Village of Flower Hill that are hooked up to natural gas lines.

==== Power ====
PSEG Long Island provides power to all homes and businesses within the Village of Flower Hill, on behalf of the Long Island Power Authority.

==== Sewage ====
Most places in Flower Hill are not connected to a sanitary sewer system – although there were failed plans in the 1970s to create a sewer district for much of northwestern Nassau County, which would have included Flower Hill in the second phase of the $122 million (1972 USD) project. As such, the majority of homes and businesses in Flower Hill rely on cesspools and septic systems.

However, some portions of Flower Hill are connected to the sanitary sewers operated by the Port Washington Water Pollution Control District.

==== Sanitation ====
Sanitation services in Flower Hill are provided by Meadow Carting, under contract with – and on behalf of – the Village of Flower Hill.

==== Water ====
The Village of Flower Hill is served by three water districts, which roughly correspond with the school district boundaries:

- The Manhasset–Lakeville Water District – Serves the section of Flower Hill zoned for the Manhasset UFSD.
- The Port Washington Water District – Serves the section of Flower Hill zoned for the Port Washington UFSD.
- The Roslyn Water District – Serves the section of Flower Hill zoned for the Roslyn UFSD.

=== Telecommunications ===
According to the Federal Communications Commission and the New York Public Service Commission, 100% of Flower Hill has broadband coverage.

=== Healthcare and emergency services ===
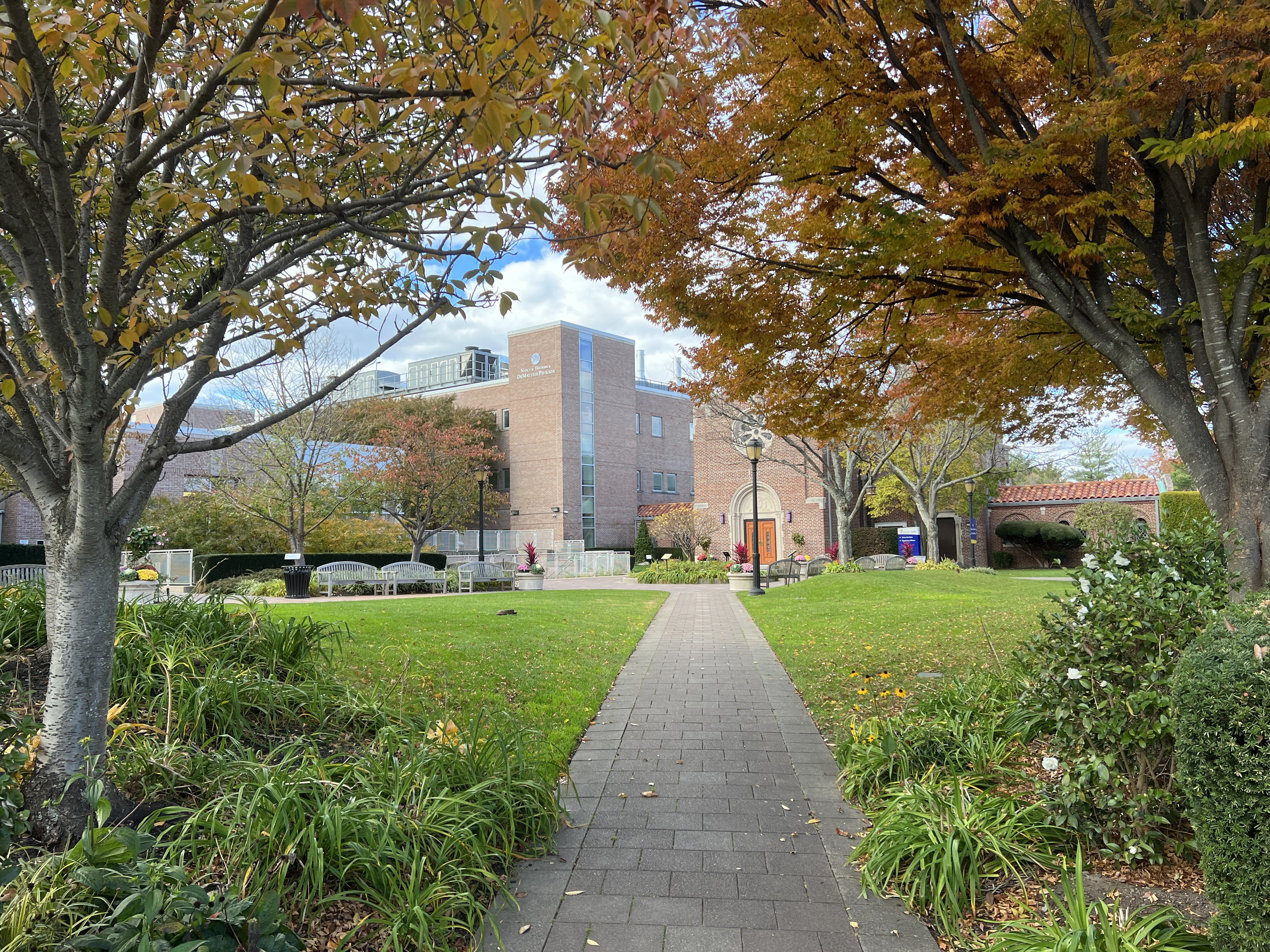
St. Francis Hospital in 2023

==== Healthcare ====
Flower Hill is home to St. Francis Hospital, located on Port Washington Boulevard, at its intersection with Middle Neck Road. St. Francis Hospital is regarded as one of the top heart care centers in the United States and is the only specialty designated cardiac center located within the State of New York. It is operated by Catholic Health Services of Long Island.

Additionally, a GoHealth urgent care center is located in the Roslyn section of the village, on Northern Boulevard (NY 25A). This walk-in clinic is operated by Northwell Health.

==== Fire ====
The Village of Flower Hill is served by three fire districts:

- The Manhasset-Lakeville Fire District – Serves most of the section of Flower Hill zoned for the Manhasset UFSD.
- The Port Washington Fire District – Serves the section of Flower Hill zoned for the Port Washington UFSD and the portions within the Manhasset UFSD not served by the Manhasset-Lakeville Fire District.
- The Roslyn Fire District – Serves the section of Flower Hill zoned for the Roslyn UFSD.

==== Police ====
The Village of Flower Hill is served by the Nassau County Police Department's 6th Precinct, with RMPs 607, 610, and 619 assigned as the patrol cars for the village.

== Landmarks ==
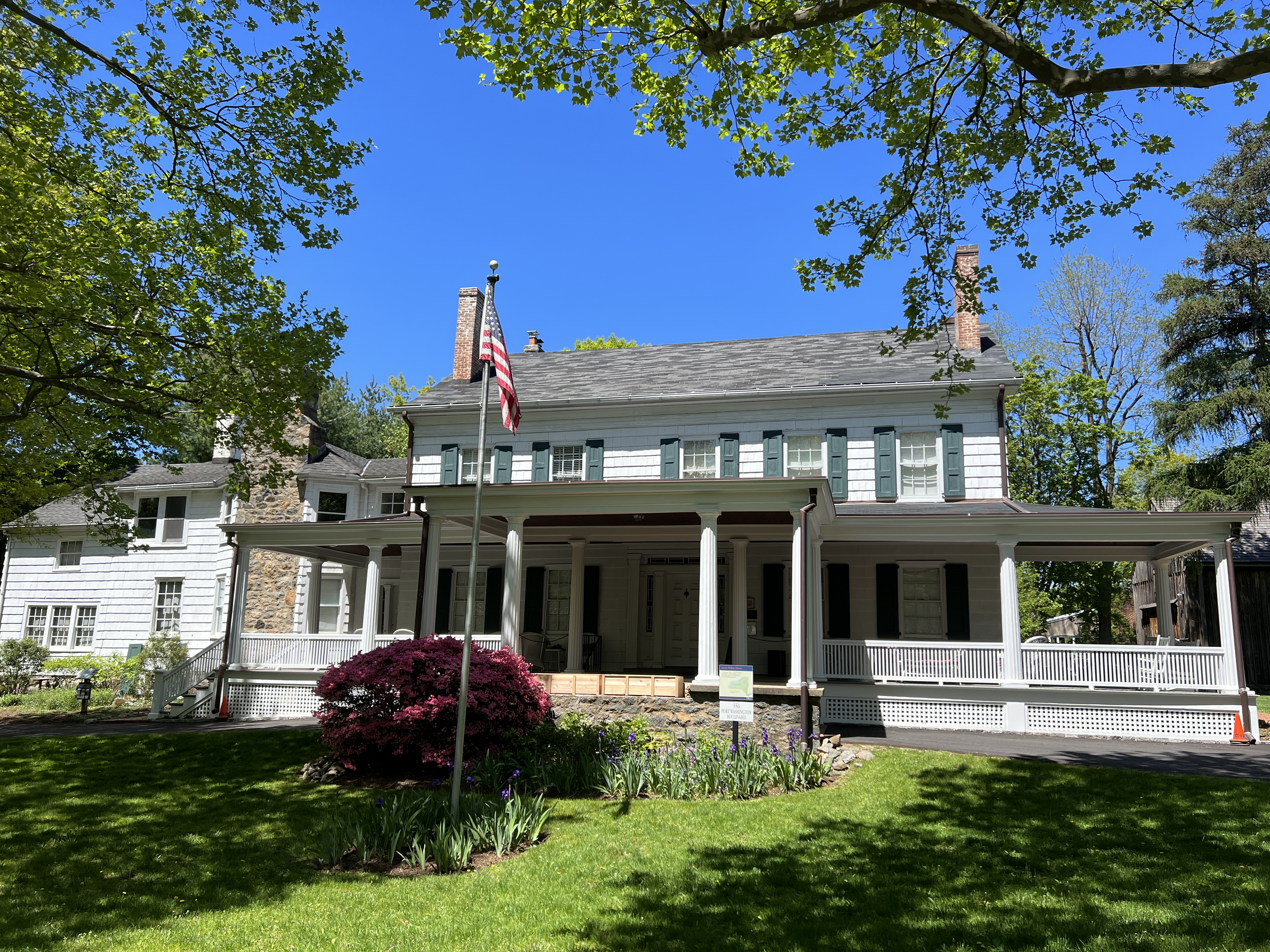
The Sands-Willets Homestead – home to the Cow Neck Peninsula Historical Society

- The Flower Hill Cemetery – A historic cemetery located in the village; it was designated a Village of Flower Hill Historic Landmark in 2023. It is also known as the "Burtis Cemetery" and the "Old Cemetery at Flower Hill".
- The George W. Denton House – Located on West Shore Road, this property was listed on the National Register of Historic Places in 1985, and is also listed on the New York State Register of Historic Places and further designated as a Village of Flower Hill Historic Landmark.
- The Sands Barn – An old barn, dating back to the 17th century; it is operated by the Cow Neck Peninsula Historical Society and located at their museum in the village. It was designated as a Village of Flower Hill Historic Landmark on April 3, 2023. It is also a designated New York State Landmark, and is listed on the National Register of Historic Places.
- The Sands-Willets Homestead – One of the original farm houses to still be standing within Flower Hill. This building is now home to the Cow Neck Peninsula Historical Society, and is designated as a Village of Flower Hill Historic Landmark and a New York State Landmark, and is also listed on the National Register of Historic Places.
- The Hewlett-Munson-Williams House – The oldest extant structure within the village. This home is now part of Nassau County's four-acre (1.6 ha) Elderfields Preserve, and is home to the Art Guild.

== Notable people ==
- Vincent R. Balletta, Jr. – Former Republican New York State Assemblyman; lived on Country Club Drive.
- Mimi Benzell – Actress and singer for Broadway and the Metropolitan Opera. Lived on Cardinal Road; married to Walter Gould – brother of American composer Morton Gould.
- Nathalie Brown – First murder victim of serial killer Ricardo Caputo; murdered at her parents' home in the village on July 31, 1971, at age 19.
- Emil Cianciulli – Businessman, lawyer, Korean War veteran, and the former chairman of the Hofstra University Board of Trustees; lived on Oaktree Lane.
- Perry Como – Singer, actor, and television personality. Como moved to Flower Hill in 1946.
- Carson Daly – NBC television and radio personality, as well as a talk show host.
- Connie Desmond – Sports broadcaster and singer.
- Edwin Díaz – MLB baseball player for the New York Mets.
- Daniel Dorff – Classical composer and musician; grew up on Crabtree Lane.
- Manoug Exerjian – Architect; Exerjian was born in the Ottoman Empire and immigrated to the United States in 1923. He designed North Shore University Hospital in Manhasset and lived on Bonnie Heights Road.
- Mike Francesca – Sports radio host.
- Frank Genese – Architect and Village Trustee; has served as Deputy Mayor of the village since 2023.
- Edmond Guggenheim – Businessman and philanthropist; member of the Guggenheim family.
- John Gurney – Bass-baritone singer for the Metropolitan Opera.
- Horace Hagedorn – Businessman; lived on Farmview Road.
- John Randolph Hearst – Business executive and the son of William Randolph Hearst.
- Benjamin Heller – Lawyer known for participating in the creation of the New York City Code of Ethics. Served as the Mayor of Flower Hill between 1963 and 1970. He lived on Hemlock Road.
- Milton Hopkins – Biology professor and author. Hopkins was the husband of Elizabeth Hewlett Hopkins, of the Hewlett family; they resided in the Hewlett Homestead.
- Victor W. Kliesrath – Former vice president of the Bendix Corporation; co-inventor of the Bragg-Kliesrath Brake.
- Kenneth G. Langone – Founder, The Home Depot. Formerly lived on Elderfields Road.
- William John Logan – Banker, college football player, and the widower of Marjorie Church Logan. Served as the Mayor of Flower Hill between 1931 and 1937; lived on Bonnie Heights Road.
- Liebert Lombardo – Musician; Guy Lombardo's younger brother.
- Robert Manning – Journalist.
- James F. McCann – Businessman; founder of 1-800 Flowers.
- Harold Blaine Miller – Former Public Relations Director of the United States Navy and rear admiral (USN), Eisenhower appointee, pilot, public relations executive, college administrator, and author; served as Village Trustee.
- Christopher Mullin – Former NBA basketball player.
- Patrice Munsel – American opera singer; Munsel was the youngest singer to ever star at the Metropolitan Opera, at the age of 17.
- Carlos W. Munson – President of the Munson Steamship Company; resided at Elderfields. Munson was the founding father of Flower Hill.
- Nelson Olmsted – Actor; lived on Mason Drive.
- Norman F. Penny – Banker, insurance broker, and politician who had served in the New York State Assembly from 1938 to 1942; major Republican figure in Nassau County. Lived on Knolls Lane.
- Elaine Phillips – Served as Mayor of Flower Hill from 2012 until 2016, when she was elected to the New York State Senate on November 8, 2016.
- Ralph Pulitzer, Jr. – Son of publisher Ralph Pulitzer; lived on Elderfields Road in the Manhasset section of Flower Hill.
- Günter Reimann – Economist and writer from Germany; vocal critic of Adolf Hitler, antisemitism, fascism, and the Nazis.
- Jesse J. Ricks – Former board chairman of Union Carbide; his estate, Chanticlare, was subdivided in the 1960s and became the Chanticlare at Flower Hill housing development.
- Barry Scheck – Attorney and legal scholar; grew up in Flower Hill.
- Robert C. Schuler – Advertising and public relations executive; Patrice Munsel's husband.
- Ben Selvin – Musician, band leader, and Guinness World Record-holding record producer known as "The Dean of Recorded Music"; lived on Reni Road.
- Walter Slezak – Austrian actor; lived in Flower Hill until committing suicide at the age of 80.
- Thomas J. Stevenson, Sr. – Shipping executive who founded the T. J. Stevenson & Company; lived on Elderfields Road.
- Michael J. Tully, Jr. – Former lawyer and politician; Tully served as the Town of North Hempstead Supervisor and as a New York State Senator. He died of a heart attack in his home on Elderfields Road in 1997.
- Charles F. Vachris – Civil engineer and politician; lived on Ridge Drive West and later on Dogwood Lane. Vachris held various roles in Flower Hill's government, including Village Trustee and Village Engineer.
- Elizabeth Trump Walter – The sister of Fred Trump, the mother of John Walter, and President Donald J. Trump's aunt.
- John W. Walter – Mayor of Flower Hill between 1988 and 1996, and following that, the Village Historian until his death in 2018. Walter was the first cousin of President Donald J. Trump.
- Burl S. Watson – President and CEO of Cities Service Company.
- Bagley Wright – Real estate developer and philanthropist, notable for being a developer of the Space Needle in Seattle. Wright and his family moved to an Aspinwall & Simpson-designed home on Elderfields Road around 1940.

== In popular culture ==
Over the years, scenes for several movies and television shows have been filmed in the Village of Flower Hill – including scenes for A Stranger Is Watching, Boardwalk Empire, Too Big to Fail, The Outcasts, and Billions. Additionally, scenes for a David Chase movie were filmed in a home on Bonnie Heights Road, and TruTV shot a show on tag sales in Flower Hill.

== See also ==
- List of Tree Cities USA
- List of municipalities in New York
