= Flower Hill Village Park =

Park in Flower Hill, New York

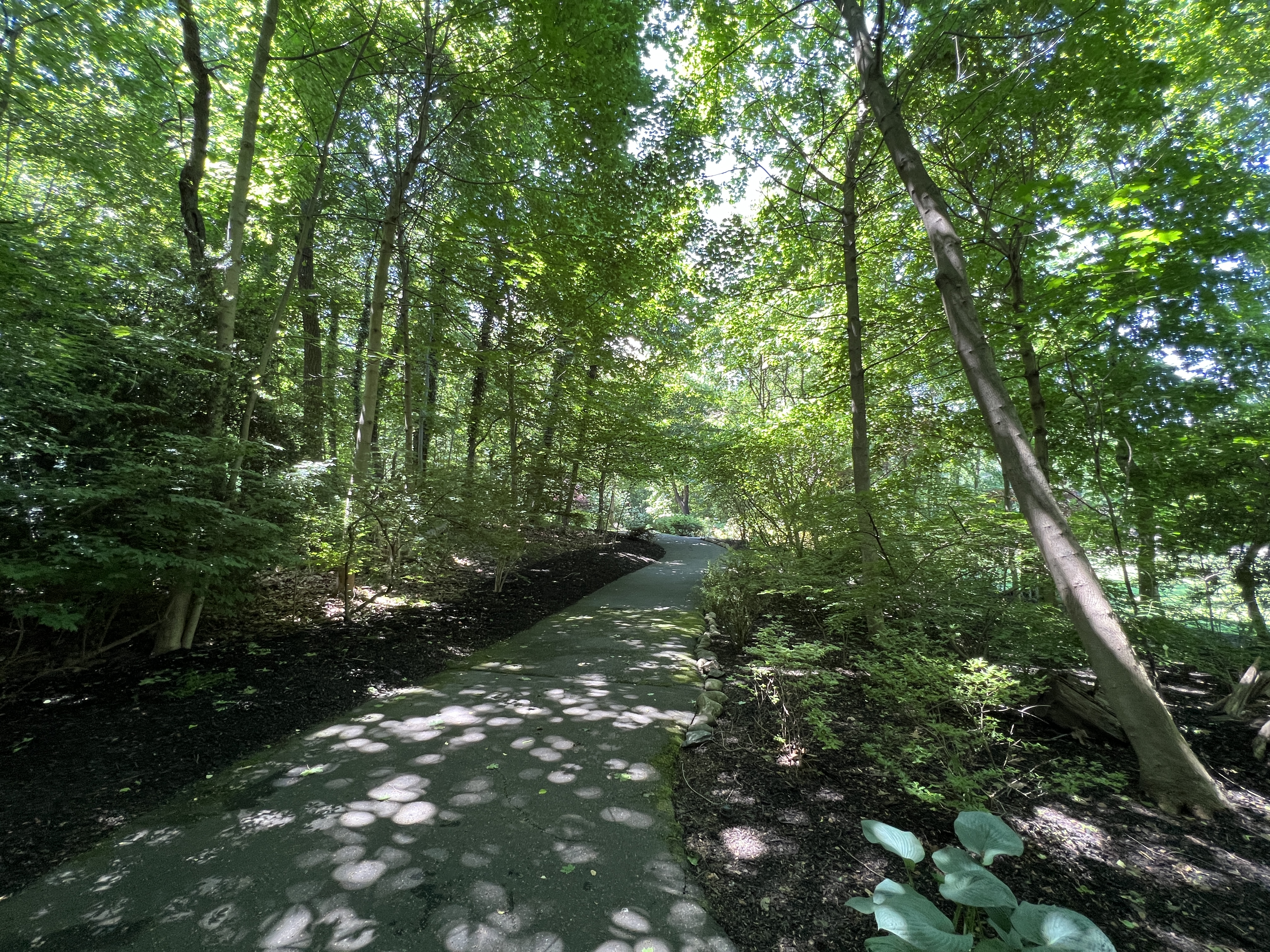
- A pathway in Flower Hill Village Park in 2022
- Interactive map of Flower Hill Village Park
- Type: Village-owned; public
- Location: Flower Hill, New York
- Coordinates: 40°48′36.2″N 73°40′38.3″W
- Area: 6.38 acres (2.58 ha)
- Designer: Ann C. Frankel
- Owner: Village of Flower Hill
- Operator: Village of Flower Hill
- Status: Open
- Paths: Yes
- Parking: Yes
- Website: www.villageflowerhill.gov

Flower Hill Village Park (formerly known as Flower Hill County Park) is a park located within the Incorporated Village of Flower Hill, in Nassau County, on Long Island, in New York, United States.

The park is owned and operated by the Village of Flower Hill.

== Description ==
The park is located off Port Washington Boulevard (NY 101), between Stonytown Road and Bonnie Heights Road. Parking is available along Stonytown Road, adjacent to the park – as well as at Flower Hill Village Hall, across from the park's eastern Bonnie Heights Road entrance.

Additionally, the bicycle & pedestrian path running along Stonytown Road terminates at the park.

== History ==
The 6.38-acre (2.58 ha) park was originally developed and operated by Nassau County, as Flower Hill County Park; the park was developed in the early 1960s.

In 2006, the park was purchased from Nassau County by the Village of Flower Hill – along with the portion of Stonytown Road located within the village. The park underwent significant renovations and enhancements shortly thereafter and into the 2010s. These renovations included updated landscaping, new and rehabilitated paths, a new playground, a performance stage, and new sports facilities. The redesigned park was designed by resident, landscape architect, and Village Arborist Ann Frankel.

In 2011, a playground was added to the park for children between the ages of two and five, with funding allocated through a grant from the Nassau County Legislature. The playground opened in the fall of that year.

In July 2014, Flower Hill officials – including then-Mayor Elaine Phillips, along with then-New York State Senator Jack Martins – opened a new, $180,000 regulation basketball court in the park. Flower Hill resident and then-Village Engineer Charles Vachris donated many of the engineering services for its construction, with Frankel donating the continued landscaping-related architectural services. $50,000 in funding came from a New York State grant secured by Senator Jack Martins, while the other $130,000 came from revenues collected by the village through its construction permit fees. The basketball court is named in honor of Vachris – an avid basketball player – for his many years of service in the village's government, as well as for his assistance in the construction of the sports facility.

In July 2016, Flower Hill constructed a memorial to Karen Reichenbach – a resident and former village trustee who died in office that year. Also taking place in 2016 was the opening of an additional section of the playground for children between the ages of five and twelve. The expansion to the playground contains an explorer dome, which opened on August 1 of that year; the village hired playground supplier Komplan for the new equipment's installation.

In the early 2020s, the village constructed and opened a pollinator garden in the park.

== See also ==
- Elderfields Preserve
- Flower Hill Cemetery (Flower Hill, New York)
- North Hempstead Country Club
