= Landmark Diner =

The Landmark Diner
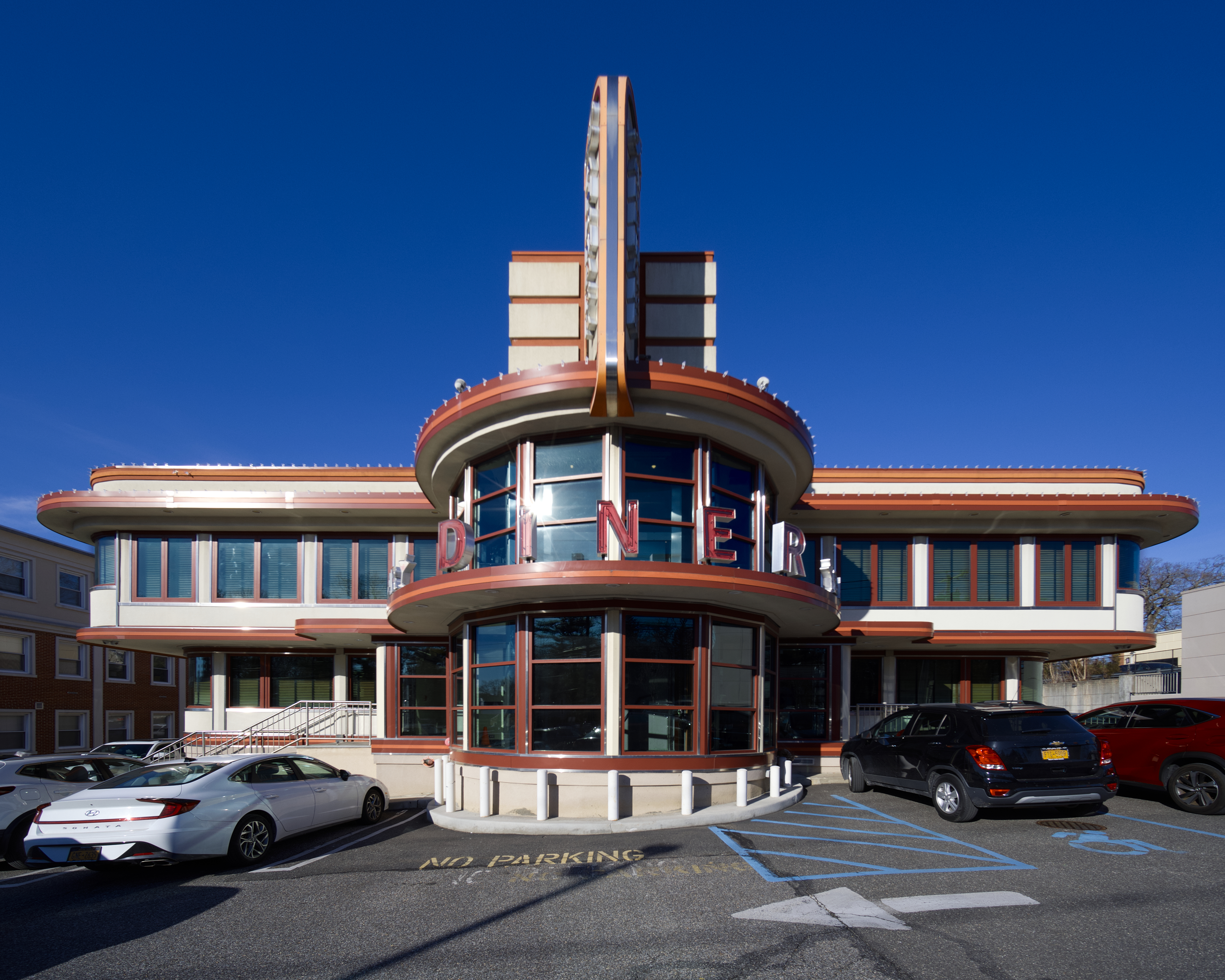
- The Landmark Diner in December 2022
- Interactive map of The Landmark Diner

Restaurant information
- Established: 1964
- Location: 1027 Northern Boulevard, Roslyn, NY 11576, Flower Hill, New York
- Coordinates: 40°47′52.4″N 73°40′03.6″W
- Website: www.landmarkdineronline.com/Home

The Landmark Diner (also referred to as "The Landmark") is a diner located in the Incorporated Village of Flower Hill, in Nassau County, on Long Island, in New York, United States. It became the first double-decker diner in the United States after being rebuilt a couple of lots to the east in 2009.

== Description ==
=== Original building, 1964 - 2009 ===
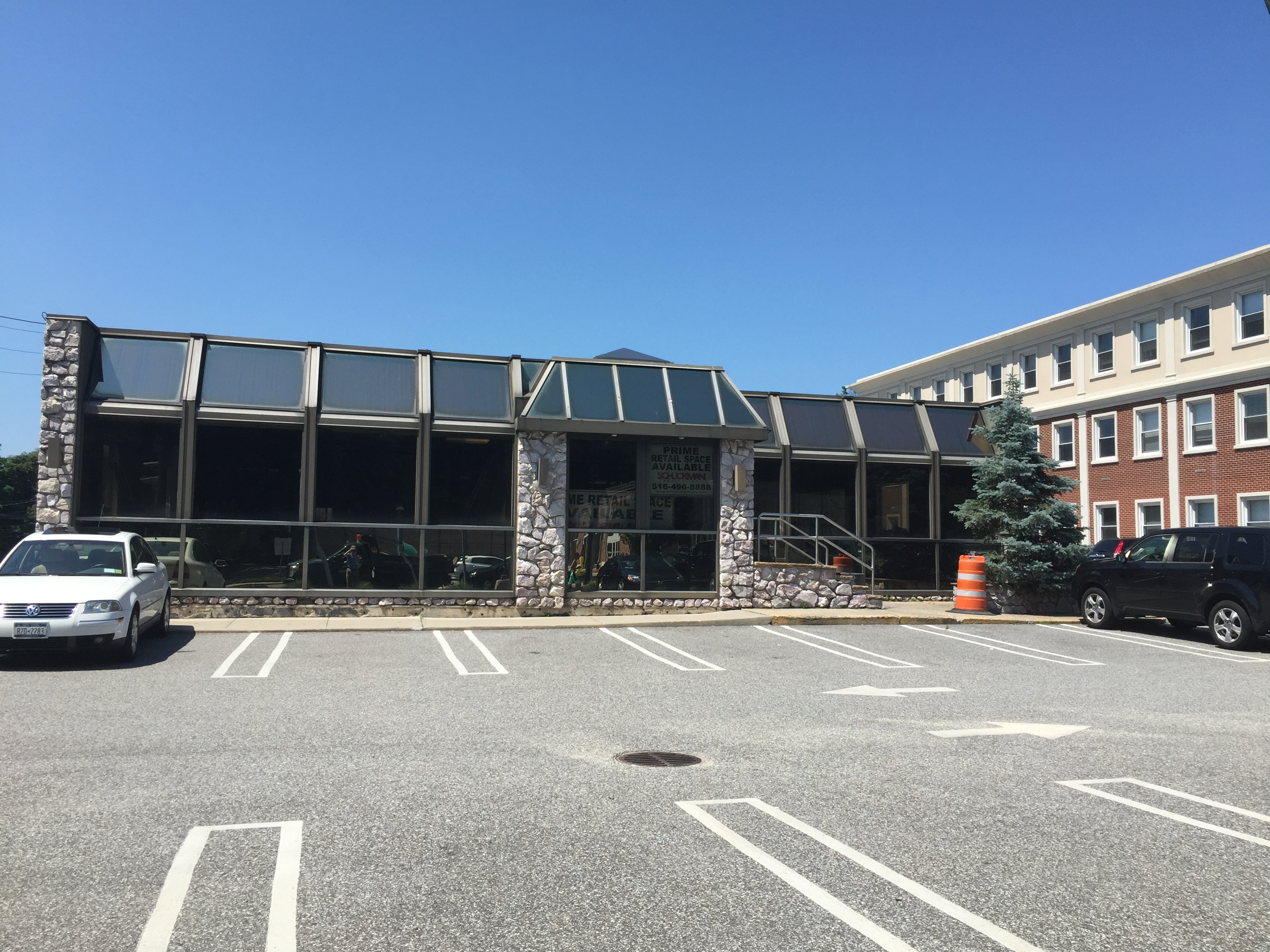
The original Landmark Diner building, pictured in 2015

The Landmark Diner originally opened in 1964 in a single-story building. This structure housed the Landmark until 2009, when the current building opened. This move was made for a number of reasons, including the existing dining space. Additionally, a new septic system was needed, and the original property could not accommodate the upgrades.

After the current building opened, the original lot, located at 1023 Northern Boulevard, was rebuilt as a furniture store.

=== Current building, 2009 - present ===
The current, double-decker building opened in 2009 at 1027 Northern Boulevard, 120 feet (37 m) east of the original structure, making it the first prefabricated double-deck diner in the United States. The entrance features a foyer whose centerpiece is a glass elevator. There are dining rooms on both the first and second floors, and the second floor's dining areas are visible from the first floor's dining areas. The upstairs also features a central bar and a private party room.
