= Flower Hill Village Hall =

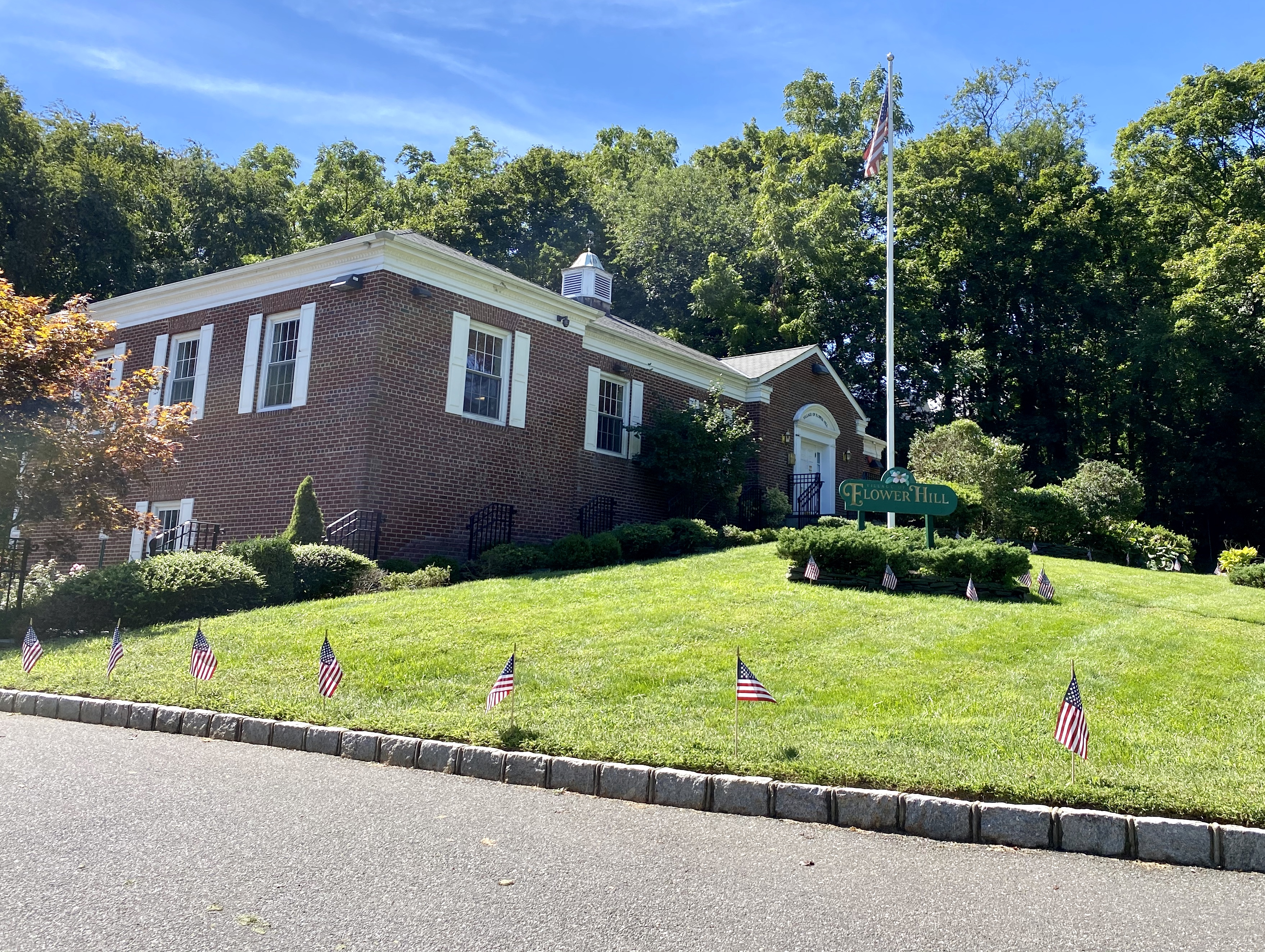
- Flower Hill Village Hall in 2020

General information
- Type: Village hall
- Architectural style: Colonial
- Location: 1 Bonnie Heights Road, Manhasset, NY 11030
- Coordinates: 40°48′33.9″N 73°40′37.6″W
- Construction started: July 1948
- Opened: 1949
- Cost: $60,000 (1948 USD)
- Owner: Incorporated Village of Flower Hill

Design and construction
- Architect: Henry W. Johanson
- Main contractor: Robert Johnson, Inc.

Other information
- Parking: Yes

Flower Hill Village Hall is the municipal building for the Incorporated Village of Flower Hill, in Nassau County, on the North Shore of Long Island, in New York, United States.

Serving as the administrative headquarters for Flower Hill, it houses the Village of Flower Hill's government and the village's service & maintenance vehicles – in addition to the Flower Hill Village Historical Gallery. It also serves as a local facility for the Nassau County Police Department.

== Description ==
The building is located at 1 Bonnie Heights Road, on a one-acre (0.40 ha) plot of land, directly across the street from the Flower Hill Village Park. This property used to be the location of the real estate office of Carlos W. Munson – a prominent, early Flower Hill resident, the incorporated village's founding father, and the former chairman of the Munson Steamship Company.

In addition to holding village elections, Flower Hill Village Hall is also the polling location for voters residing in New York State Assembly District 16's election districts 59, 60, and 61 during general elections.

Village Hall is also the location where the Nassau County Police Department's RMPs 607 and 610, which service Flower Hill, change tours.

Flower Hill Village Hall is also a stop on two of the Flower Hill Historic Trail's seven walking tour routes.

== History ==
In a February 1948 referendum vote, the voters of Flower Hill approved the construction of a new village hall. Designed by Roslyn-based architect Henry W. Johanson in the colonial architectural style, it includes a administrative offices, a meeting room, and an entrance hall, as well as a garage for Flower Hill's service vehicles. Construction on Village Hall commenced in July 1948. The building was constructed by New York City-based Robert Johnson, Inc. for a cost of $60,000 (1948 USD).

The first meeting to be held within the building by Flower Hill's Board of Trustees took place on February 24, 1949, and the Board of Trustees directed that the significance of the occasion be noted within the minutes of that meeting.

Additionally, Trustee Harry Vaubel gifted a flag and flag pole to the Village of Flower Hill; this gift coincided with the opening of Village Hall.

On April 28, 1956, the local Garden Liaison Committee planted two dogwood trees on the property as a means of expressing their gratitude to the village's officials for letting them conduct their meetings within the building.

In 1951, a contentious debate took place regarding the serving of coffee and donuts at Village Hall. Residents and members of local civic associations – notably the Flower Hill Association and the Flower Hill Women's Club – were divided over whether or not such items should be served at meetings within the building, and played a major role in the outcome of the Village's 1951 elections. The debate started when trustees denied the local civic associations the ability to serve these items at their meetings, and the Flower Hill Association nominated two candidates to oust the trustees who were opposed to allowing these items to be served.

In 1996, in light of the passing of then-Village Clerk Barbara Errett, the Village of Flower Hill dedicated a garden in front of the building in her honor. The plantings were donated by then-Mayor John W. Walter and his family.

The building was renovated and expanded in the 1990s, during the tenure of Mayor John W. Walter. Another renovation and expansion project took place in the 2000s, during the tenure of Mayor Charles W. Weiss.

== Flower Hill Village Historical Gallery ==
In 2023, the Village of Flower Hill created a museum at Village Hall, known as the Flower Hill Village Historical Gallery. It covers the history of Flower Hill & the surrounding areas and contains several historical photographs & other documents; the museum opened in September 2023.

== See also ==
- Bellerose Village Municipal Complex – Another village hall in Nassau County, in the Village of Bellerose.
- Sea Cliff Village Hall, Library, and Museum Complex – Another village hall in Nassau County, in the Village of Sea Cliff.
