= Vincent Smith School =

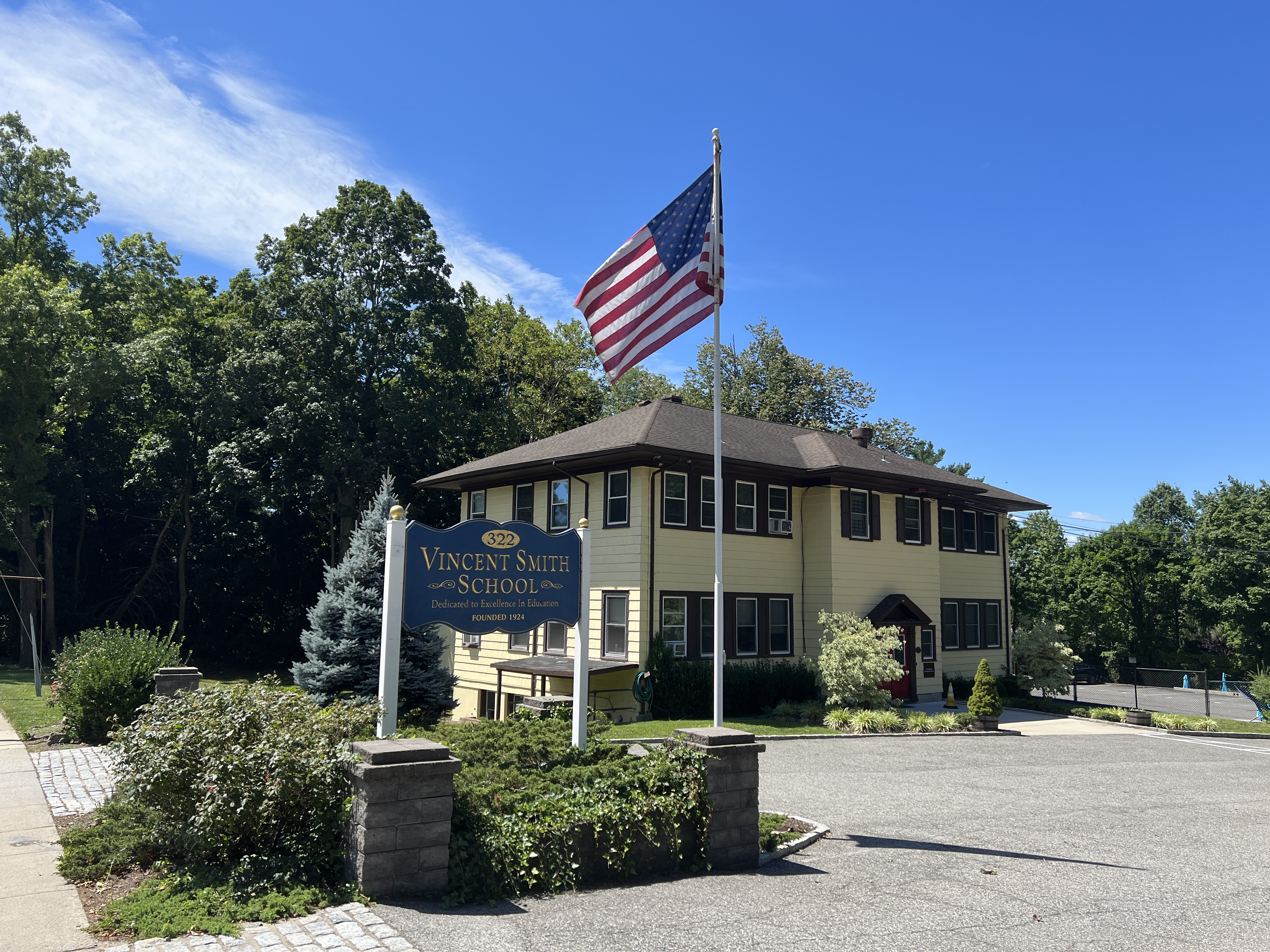
- The Vincent Smith School, as seen in July 2023, from its entrance on Port Washington Boulevard.

Location
- 322 Port Washington Boulevard, Port Washington, NY 11050; Incorporated Village of Flower Hill; 40°48′53.4″N 73°40′50.2″W

Information
- School type: Independent
- Established: 1924
- Founder: Adelaide Vincent Smith
- NCES School ID: 00942212
- Dean: Lois Dierlam
- Head of school: John Baldi
- Grades: 1-12
- Enrollment: 46 (2019–2020)
- Student to teacher ratio: 2.7:1
- Colors: Blue, yellow
- Website: www.vincentsmithschool.org

The Vincent Smith School is an independent, co-ed school located in the Incorporated Village of Flower Hill in Nassau County, on the North Shore of Long Island, in New York, United States.

== Overview ==
The Vincent Smith school opened in 1924. It is co-ed, and specializes in educating students with learning disabilities between grades 1 and 12. It is associated with the New York State Association of Independent Schools. The school colors are blue and yellow. The school is named for Adelaide Vincent Smith, its founder.

In 1963, the Vincent Smith School acquired a new, additional building adjacent to the existing school. This new building allowed the school resume teaching 8th grade. This new building houses dining facilities, a science lab, classrooms, a library, and offices for the school's administration. When opened, this building handled grades 5 through 8.

In 1970, the school, which was slated to permanently close due to financial difficulties, was saved by parents. At the time, the school was faced with a deficit of $60,000 (1970 USD), and was in search of $500 in monthly rent, which resulted in the school's 9-member board deciding to close the school. 60% of the school's parents responded by meeting with the school board and assisted them in meeting a $30,000 bank loan. Furthermore, several teachers and parents donated money to help support the school; a teacher contributed $100 from her salary each month and a parent who was a retired police officer from Queens donated $125 via check.

The school, which is located on 4.5 acres (1.8 ha) of property, is located off Port Washington Boulevard (NY 101), and is sandwiched between the Homewood and Flower Hill Country Estates housing developments of Flower Hill.

== Administration ==
The table below contains the administrators of the Vincent Smith School, as of October 2020:

Vincent Smith School administrators (2022–23):
Name	Position
John Baldi	School head
Lois Dierlam	Dean

== Demographics ==
As of the 2019–2020 school year, the Vincent Smith School had 46 enrolled students, spanning from grade 2 through grade 12. The student-teacher ratio was 2.7-to-1, and the school employed approximately 17 full time-equivalent (FTE) teachers.

The table below shows the racial makeup of the Vincent Smith School's student body:

Vincent Smith School students by race/ethnicity (2019–2020):
Race/Ethnicity	# of Students
White	33
Black or African American	4
Asian	1
Native American or Alaska Native	0
Native Hawaiian or Pacific Islander	0
Hispanic or Latino (any race)	8
Two or more races	0
