= Benjamin Heller (lawyer) =

American lawyer and politician (c. 1905–1974)

10th Mayor of Flower Hill, New York
- In office 1963–1970
- Preceded by: John E. Mahoney
- Succeeded by: George B. Higgins

Personal details
- Born: c. 1905; Liverpool, England
- Died: May 13, 1974 (aged 68 or 69); North Shore University Hospital, Manhasset, New York, US
- Resting place: Beth David Cemetery, Farmingdale, New York
- Spouse: Ruth Heller (born Kruetzer)
- Children: 3
- Education: New York University; Harvard Law School
- Occupation: Lawyer; politician
- Known for: New York City Code of Ethics; law; 10th Mayor of Flower Hill, New York

Benjamin Heller was an English-American lawyer and politician, who is known for his work in creating the New York City Code of Ethics and for serving as the 10th Mayor of Flower Hill, New York.

== Biography ==
=== Birth ===
Heller was born in Liverpool, England, ca. 1905.

=== Education ===
For college, Heller attended New York University, and served as the Senior President of the Student Council of New York University. After graduating from New York University, Heller then attended Harvard Law School, where he earned his bachelor's degree in law in 1929.

=== Career ===
After graduating from Harvard, Heller began working as a lawyer, and joined the Brooklyn-based firm of Meier Steinbrink. When Steinbrink was elected as a New York State Supreme Court Justice in 1932, Heller became his law secretary.

In the 1950s, Heller served as counsel to the New York City Council. During this time, Heller was one of the participants in the creation of the New York City Code of Ethics, and was associated with Stanley Kruetzer in the creation of the ethics code.

In 1962, Heller served as a special arbitrator in the dispute between the Marine Engineers Beneficial Association and American Export–Isbrandtsen Lines. In this dispute, Heller ruled in favor of the engineers, concluding that the union's contract must remain in place once Isbrandtsen's fleet got transferred to American Export Lines. Heller was selected to be the special arbitrator for the ruling because the regular arbitrator for matters relating to contract disputes, Dr. Donald F. Shaughnessy, was unable to participate.

==== Mayor of Flower Hill, New York (1963–1970) ====
On March 19, 1963, Heller was elected as the 10th Mayor of the Village of Flower Hill. He served in this capacity until 1970, when he was succeeded by George B. Higgins.

Prior to serving as the mayor of Flower Hill, Heller had served for many years as a trustee for the village.

=== Death ===
Heller died on May 13, 1974, at North Shore University Hospital in Manhasset, New York, after a long battle with an illness. He is buried at Beth David Cemetery in Farmingdale, New York.

== Personal life ==
At the time of his death, Heller lived at 166 Hemlock Road in Flower Hill.

Heller was married to Ruth. Together, they had three children: Susan, Carole, and Richard.

== See also ==
- List of New York University alumni
- List of Harvard University people
