= Corona station (LIRR) =

Train station in New York City (1855–1964)

Corona
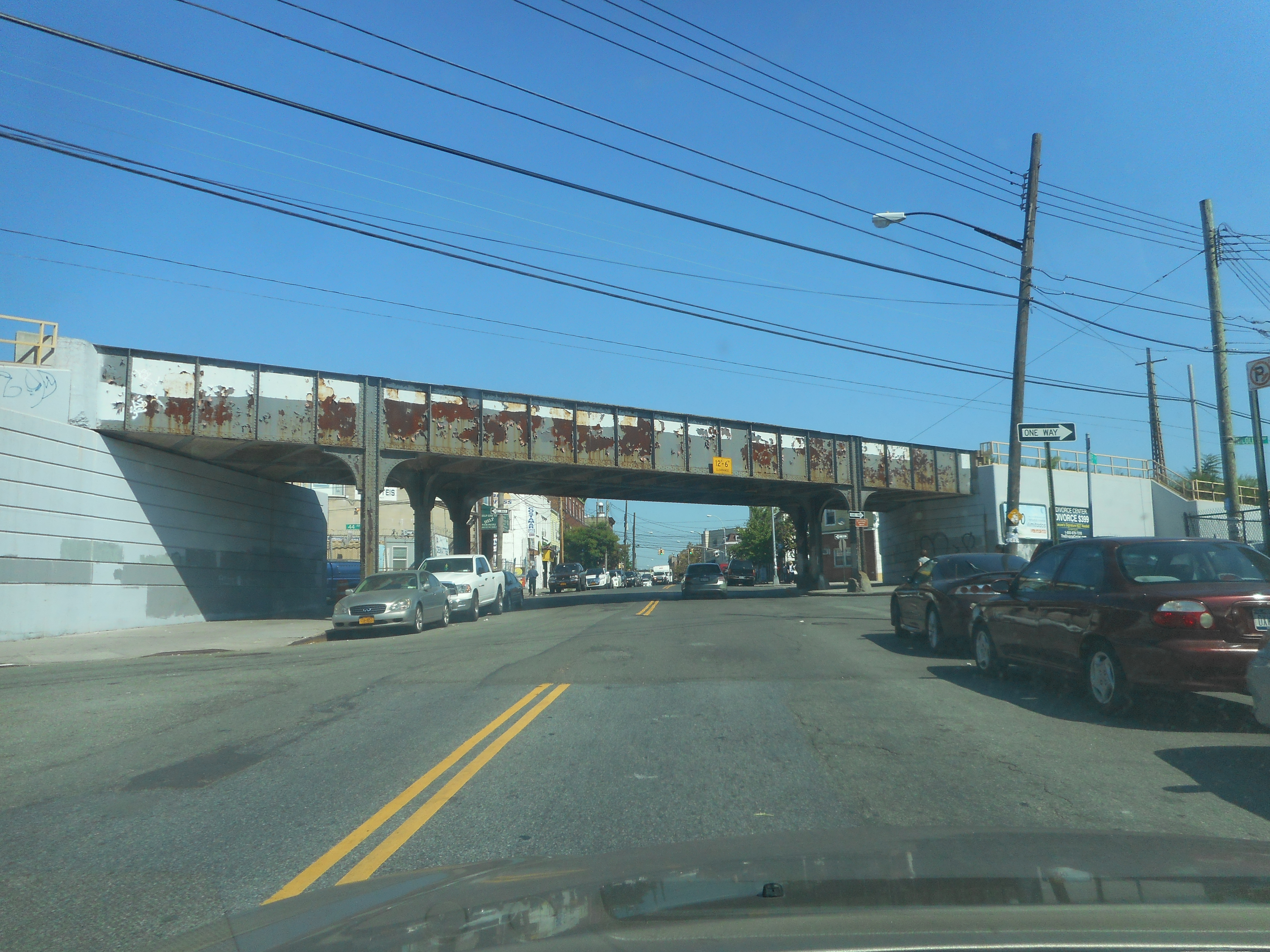
- LIRR bridge where the former Corona LIRR station was once located.

General information
- Location: National Street and 45th Avenue; Corona, Queens, New York
- Coordinates: 40°44′45.3″N 73°51′51.3″W
- Owner: Long Island Rail Road
- Line: Port Washington Branch
- Platforms: 2 side platforms
- Tracks: 2

Other information
- Station code: None
- Fare zone: 1

History
- Opened: 1855 (NY&F)
- Closed: 1880; April 8, 1964
- Rebuilt: 1872, 1890, 1894, 1930
- Former names: Fashion Race Course (1855–????); West Flushing (????––1872)

Former services
Preceding station	Long Island Rail Road	Following station
Elmhurst toward Winfield Junction	North Side Division	Flushing–Main Street toward Port Washington
Terminus	Whitestone Branch	Flushing–Bridge Street toward Whitestone Landing
Location

Corona was a station along the Port Washington Branch of the Long Island Rail Road in the Corona section of Queens, New York City. It was one of two stations built by the Flushing Railroad in Corona, this one having been at Grand Avenue (later called National Avenue, now National Street) and 45th Avenue. The station first opened as Fashion Race Course in March 1855. It was then renamed West Flushing, once the West Flushing station at 108th Street closed, and possibly when the race track was closed in 1869, and later renamed Corona around June 1872 when the Post Office was opened under the name of Corona. The race pens were located on this street which led directly north to the Fashion Race Course.

Service began on April 2, 1855. The second depot was built in September or October 1872 and was burned down on December 9, 1880.

The former Corona Park depot from the White Line, abandoned four years earlier, was moved to the site as a replacement around 1890 and was itself razed around September 1894.

The fourth depot was built in September 1894 and was razed in 1930 due to a grade crossing elimination project. A temporary station was put in service to the south of the former location on May 8, 1930. Elevated platforms were constructed in mid-October 1930, with the westbound platform opening on October 13 and the eastbound platform opening on October 17.

The station stop was discontinued on April 8, 1964, the same year that the World's Fair station re-opened.

== Original West Flushing station ==
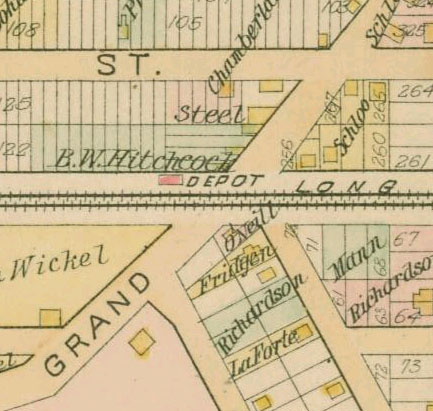
1891 map of Corona station, at Grand Avenue

Three blocks east of Corona station was another station named West Flushing that served the community at large. It was located at what is today 108th Street and 44th Avenue, and was built in September 1854. Though even the most scholarly railroad historians never knew when the station was closed, it may have been related to the purchase of the New York and Flushing Railroad by the Flushing and North Side Railroad, if not then the 1869 closure of the horse racing track served by Corona station. A December 31, 1869 timetable refers to a "West Flushing" station, but it is unknown whether it refers to the original station or not.

== Baseball ==
Race course & vicinity, 1859

Fashion Course itself, which opened as a horse race track in 1853, was the venue used to stage a series of three intra-city all-star baseball games in 1858. These games were notable for having the first known admission charge to watch baseball. The games were held on July 20, August 17, and September 10. The race course is documented on some old maps. Its gate was located at what is now 37th Avenue and 103rd Street in Corona, about a mile west-southwest of the eventual sites of Shea Stadium and Citi Field. The former race course was auctioned off as housing lots, by owner D.O. Grinnell, beginning in the summer of 1874.
