= White Line (Long Island Rail Road) =

Former Long Island Rail Road branch

White Line (LIRR)

Overview
- Status: Abandoned
- Locale: Western Queens County, New York
- Termini: Long Island City (west); Flushing (east)
- Stations: 8

Service
- Type: Passenger and Freight
- Operator(s): Long Island Rail Road

History
- Opened: November 10, 1873
- Closed: April 17, 1876

Technical
- Track gauge: 4 ft 8 1/2 in (1,435 mm)

The White Line was a short-lived branch of the Long Island Rail Road in western Queens County, New York. Officially known as the Newtown and Flushing Railroad, the line was chartered in 1871, but was only in service from 1873 to 1876.

== History ==
In the first two decades of its existence, the Long Island Rail Road enjoyed a monopoly of rail service on Long Island. This came to an end in the early-1850s when competition came in the form of the Flushing Railroad, which ran along the north shore of Queens County, New York. In 1859, the FRR became the New York and Flushing Railroad, but as they attempted to expand into eastern Queens (now Nassau County, New York) and service declined, the LIRR decided to buy out the NY&F in 1867, and to build an additional Woodside Branch. The Woodside Branch, which was chartered under the subsidiary Flushing and Woodside Railroad was never finished, and northern Queens residence felt betrayed by the purchase of the NY&F. Therefore they convinced wealthy residents to buy the former railroads from the LIRR and chartered the Flushing and North Side Railroad as its replacement. Still seeking to compete with the F&NS for customers on the north shore of Queens, the LIRR chartered a subsidiary called the Newtown and Flushing Railroad on March 8, 1871. Due to the bright white passenger cars used on the line, it was nicknamed the White Line.

The service began at the original Hunter's Point station, today's Long Island City station and ran along the main line through Woodside Station. Southeast of Winfield Junction it split off between the Main Line (Long Island Rail Road) and what is today the Port Washington Branch. Running on a separate right-of-way south of the Port Washington Branch and north of the Main Line, it had its own Newtown Station, then the line curved northeast where it had a station for Corona called Corona Park station, then passed through the southern end of Great Neck Junction, where the Central Railroad of Long Island branched off to head towards Garden City, Bethpage and Babylon. Finally, the line ended along the south side of the Flushing and North Side main line at Flushing station. After the Flushing and North Side and the Central Railroad of Long Island were consolidated into the Flushing, North Shore and Central Railroad in 1874, which itself was later merged into the LIRR in 1876, the LIRR no longer saw any need for the White Line and it was abandoned. Horsecars replaced the trains until 1880, and the depots were destroyed either before or after being moved to other lines.

Few traces remain of the White Line today. One vestige of the line's existence is the alignment of Justice Avenue in Elmhurst, which roughly follows the White Line's path.

== Stations ==
The entire line was abandoned in 1876.

Station	Miles (km) from Penn Station	Date opened	Date closed	Modern-day connections / notes
Long Island City	1.9 (3.1)	June 26, 1854		LIRR: City Terminal Zone; NYC Subway: (at Vernon Boulevard–Jackson Avenue); MTA Bus: Q101, Q103; NY Waterway: East River Ferry
Schwalenberg's Park				Located near contemporary Queens Plaza
Sunnyside				New station on the site to be opened at Queens Boulevard and Skillman Avenue as part of East Side Access
Woodside	4.9 (7.9)	November 15, 1869		LIRR: Port Washington Branch; NYC Subway: (at 61st Street–Woodside); NYCT Bus: Q18, Q32, Q53; MTA Bus: Q70 to LGA Former junction with Flushing and Woodside Railroad
Winfield		July 1864	1929	
Junction with Flushing and North Side Railroad
Junction with LIRR Main Line
Newtown				
Corona Park				Moved to Corona on the Port Washington Branch in 1890; demolished and replaced in 1894.
Junction with Central Railroad of Long Island
Port Washington Branch converges
Flushing–Main Street	9.1 (14.6)	June 26, 1854		LIRR: Port Washington Branch; NYC Subway: (at Flushing–Main Street); NYCT Bus: Q12, Q13, Q15, Q16, Q17, Q19, Q20, Q27, Q44, Q50, Q58, Q61, Q90, Q98; MTA Bus: Q25, Q26, Q28, Q50, Q63, Q65, Q66; NICE Bus: N20G Originally Flushing
