= Elmhurst station (LIRR) =

Train station in New York City (1855–1985)

Elmhurst
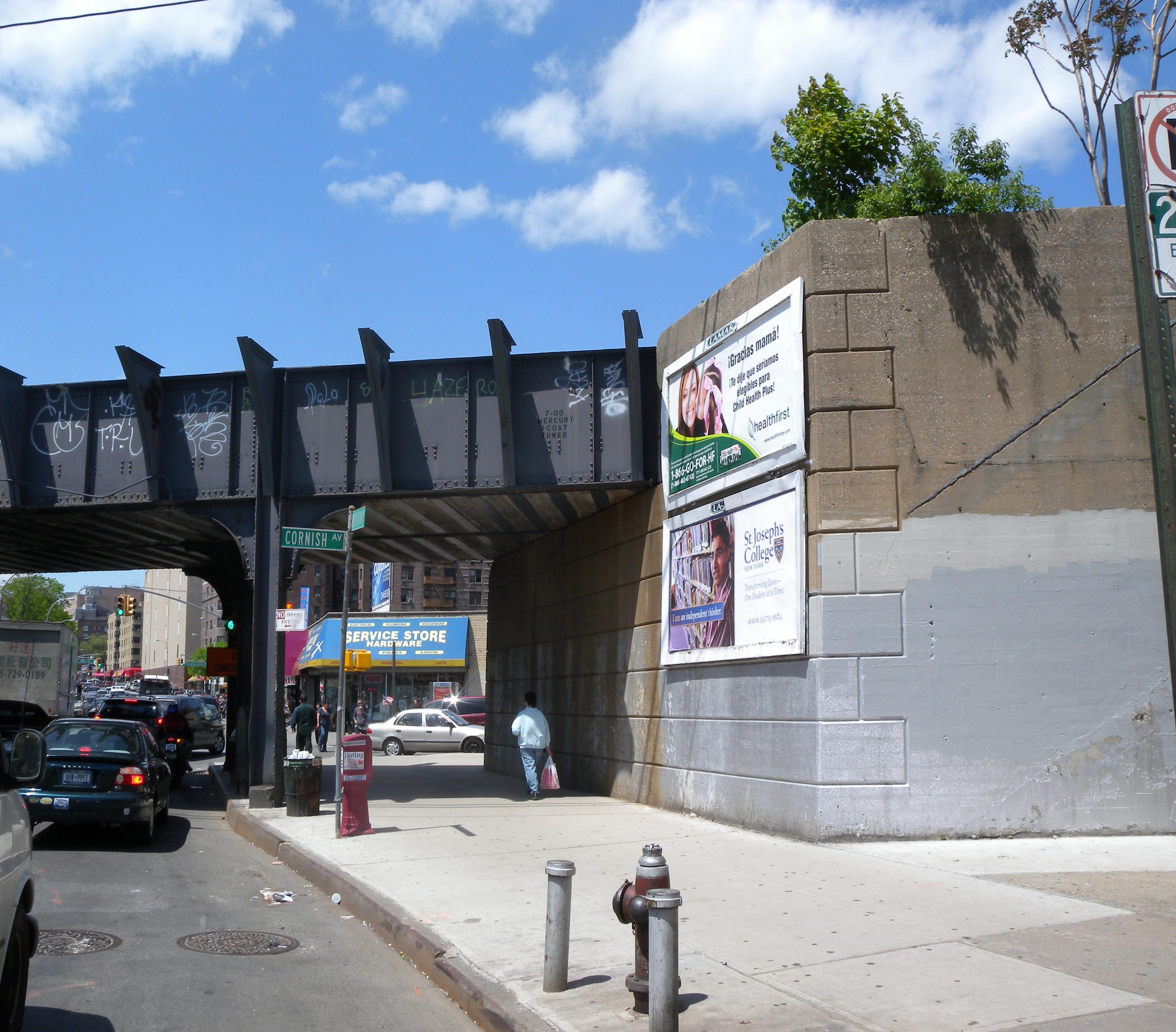
- Site of the former Elmhurst station on Broadway across from Cornish Avenue. Outlines in the concrete mark the location of a former entrance stair, and some platform support members remain.

General information
- Location: Broadway between Whitney and Cornish Avenues. Elmhurst, Queens, New York City
- Coordinates: 40°44′29″N 73°52′45.8″W
- Owner: Long Island Rail Road
- Line: Port Washington Branch
- Platforms: 2 side platforms
- Tracks: 2

Other information
- Station code: ELM
- Fare zone: 1

History
- Opened: 1855 (NY&F)
- Closed: January 22, 1985
- Rebuilt: 1888, 1927
- Former names: Newtown (1855–1897)

Former services
Preceding station	Long Island Rail Road	Following station
Woodside toward Penn Station	Port Washington Branch	Flushing–Main Street toward Port Washington
Preceding station	Long Island Rail Road	Following station
Winfield Junction Terminus	North Side Division	Corona toward Port Washington
Location

The Elmhurst station was a station of the Port Washington Branch of the Long Island Rail Road. It was located on Broadway between Cornish and Whitney Avenues in the Elmhurst section of Queens, New York City. In 2014, the Metropolitan Transportation Authority (MTA) had proposed to rebuild the station. As of 2023, only a preliminary design study is funded, with construction being considered for a future MTA capital program.

== History ==
=== 19th and 20th century stations ===
The first depot opened as Newtown in 1855 by the Flushing Railroad, and was demolished in 1888. The second depot opened around December 1888, was renamed Elmhurst in June 1897, had high platforms constructed in 1912, and was demolished around 1927. The elevated third and most recent depot opened in 1927 and was finally closed on January 22, 1985, being demolished shortly after. It stood on the east side of Broadway, a block south of the Elmhurst Avenue subway station.

=== 21st century revival ===
In March 2012, the Long Island Rail Road and lawmakers announced they were considering building a new station at Elmhurst to restore service to the area, at an estimated cost of $20 to $30 million. The 2015–2019 MTA capital program initially included $40 million to design and construct the new station, which was proposed to be in the same location as the old one. However, in a 2017 amendment, the agency postponed the construction of the new station indefinitely, only including $3 million to fund station design.

In 2022, as part of its 20-year needs assessment, the MTA proposed reviving plans for the station and funding construction in a future capital program. This will be evaluated for funding on a "level playing field" with other potential projects. In February 2023, Congresswoman Grace Meng of New York's 6th congressional district announced her renewed effort to reopen the station, sending a letter to LIRR Interim President Catherine Rinaldi. The letter received seven signatures from Meng's colleagues, who cited providing more "accessible modes of public transportation" and relieving crowding on the nearby Flushing Line as justifications for returning the station to service.

A renewed effort to reestablish the station began in 2026, with residents and local officials noting that four trains pass through the neighborhood hourly and that a reopened Elmhurst station would serve a growing community with 18-minute rides to New York Penn Station or Grand Central Madison, far faster than via subway to those destinations. The MTA responded that a 2023 study had shown that renewed service at the station would cost $210 million and slow down other passengers on the Port Washington branch while offering minimal time savings to local commuters.

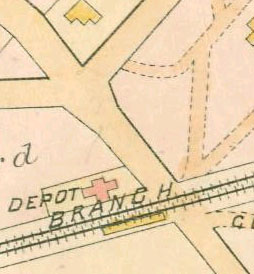
1891 map of Elmhurst station, when it was still called Newtown station

== Station layout ==
■ Port Washington Branch	does not stop here (Woodside)
■ Port Washington Branch	does not stop here (Mets – Willets Point)

The Elmhurst station was built on ground level, later raised onto an embankment traversing Broadway past Whitney Avenue. The station had a two side platforms and a pedestrian underpass connecting the intersection of Ketcham Place and 43rd Avenue with the intersection of Dongan Avenue and 88th Street. The underpass remains open today. Additionally, there was an entrance to the Port Washington-bound platform near the corner of Cornish Avenue and Broadway. Additionally, there was a freight loading area near the Durkee Spice Factory (now the new Elmhurst Educational Complex) where freight would be unloaded.
