= Port Washington Branch =

Long Island Rail Road branch

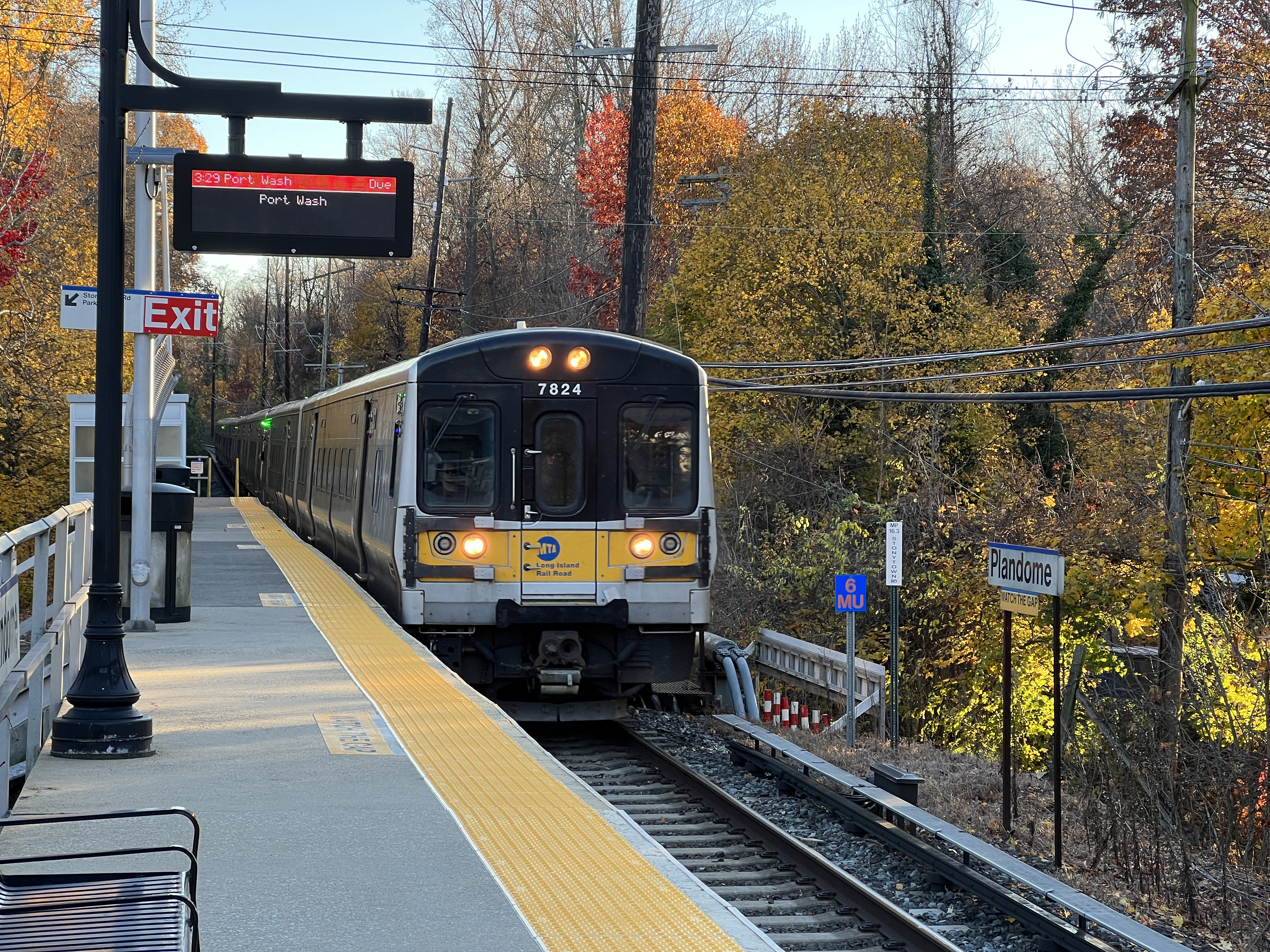
- A Port Washington Branch train enters the Plandome station

Overview
- Status: Operational
- Owner: Long Island Rail Road
- Locale: Queens and Nassau County, New York, U.S.
- Termini: Woodside; Port Washington
- Stations: 13

Service
- Type: Commuter rail
- System: Long Island Rail Road
- Operator: Metropolitan Transportation Authority
- Daily ridership: 27,202 (2023)
- Ridership: 12,556,605 (2025)

History
- Opened: 1854 (as Flushing Railroad)

Technical
- Track gauge: 4 ft 8 1/2 in (1,435 mm) standard gauge
- Electrification: Third rail, 750 V DC

The Port Washington Branch is an electrified, mostly double-tracked rail line and service owned and operated by the Long Island Rail Road in the U.S. state of New York. It branches north from the Main Line at the former Winfield Junction station, just east of the Woodside station in the New York City borough of Queens, and runs roughly parallel to Northern Boulevard past Mets-Willets Point (Citi Field), Flushing, Murray Hill, Broadway, Auburndale, Bayside, Douglaston, Little Neck, and then crosses into Nassau County for stops in Great Neck, Manhasset, and Plandome before terminating at Port Washington.

The Port Washington Branch is the only LIRR branch to not serve Jamaica – a major LIRR transportation hub – as it branches off the Main Line at Winfield Junction, several miles northwest of Jamaica. Thus, passengers seeking to switch to other LIRR services without going into Manhattan must instead transfer at Woodside station.

== Route description ==
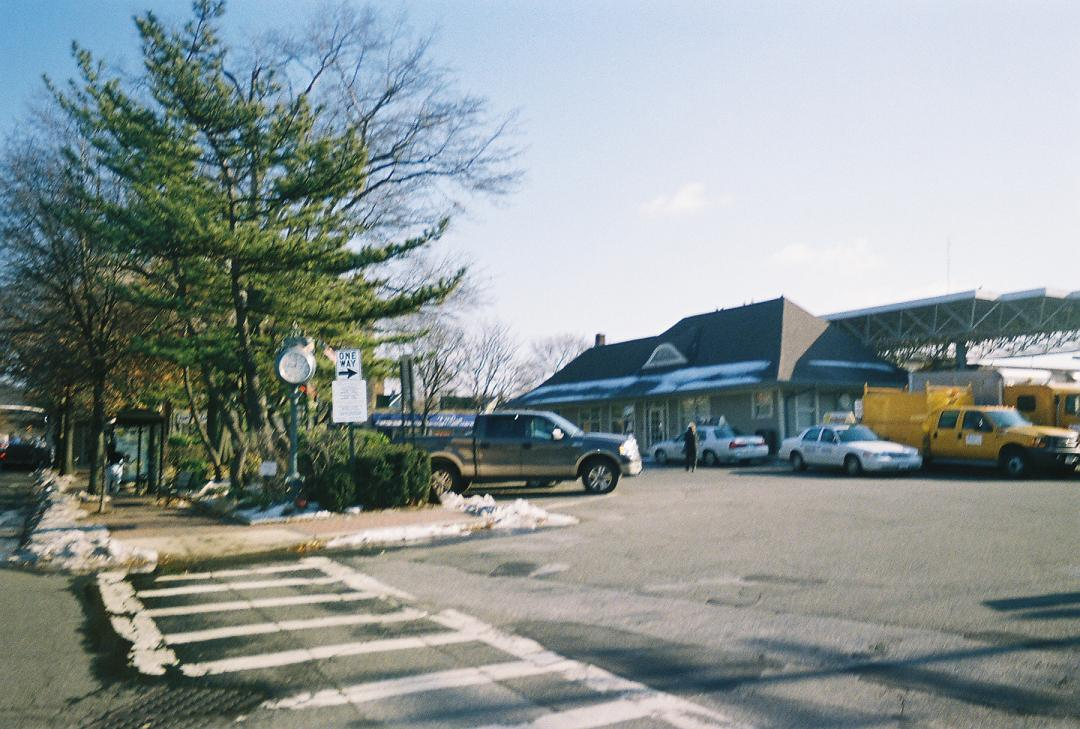
The Port Washington station from the corner of Main Street and Haven Avenue in Port Washington

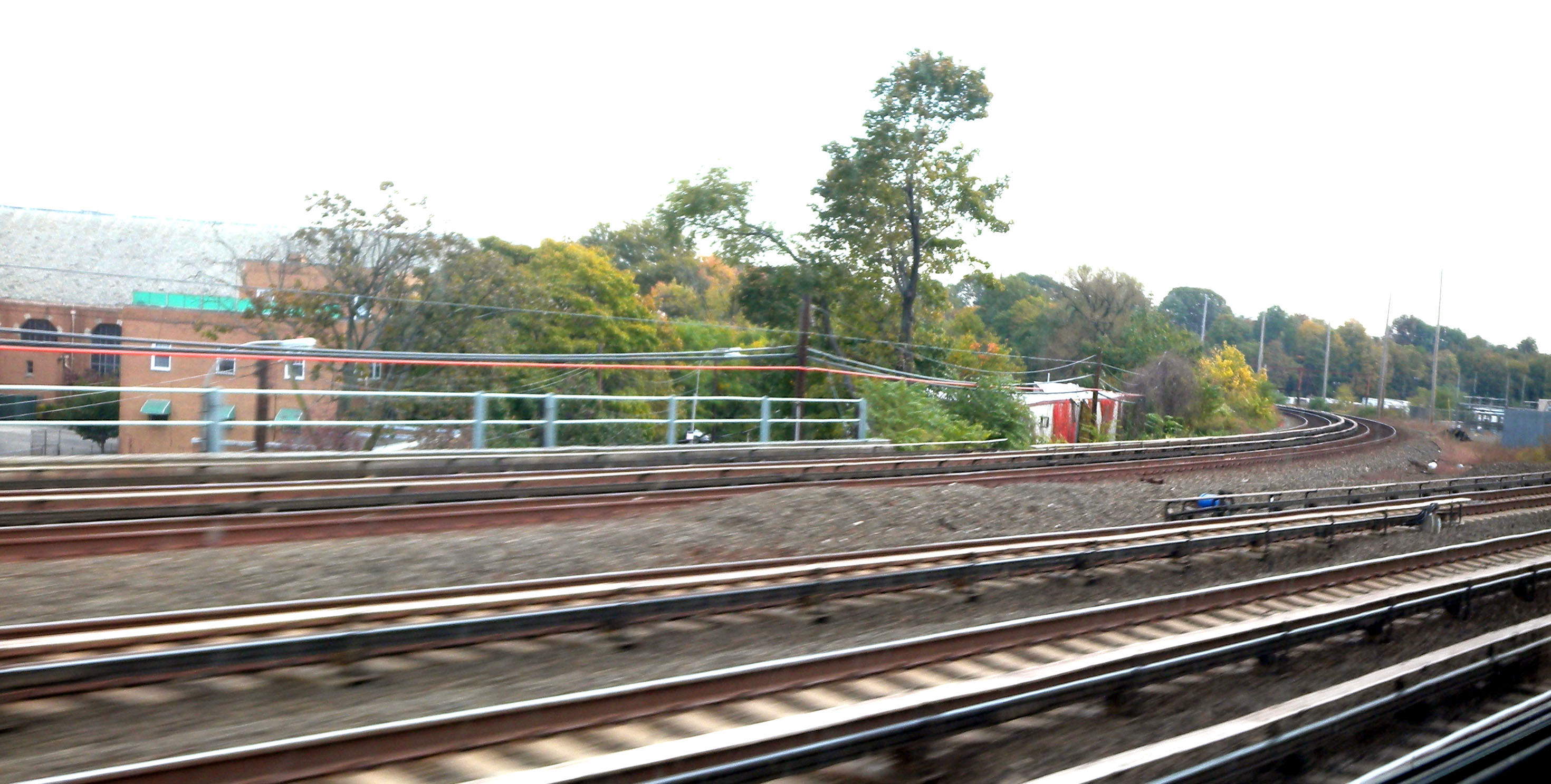
Winfield Junction

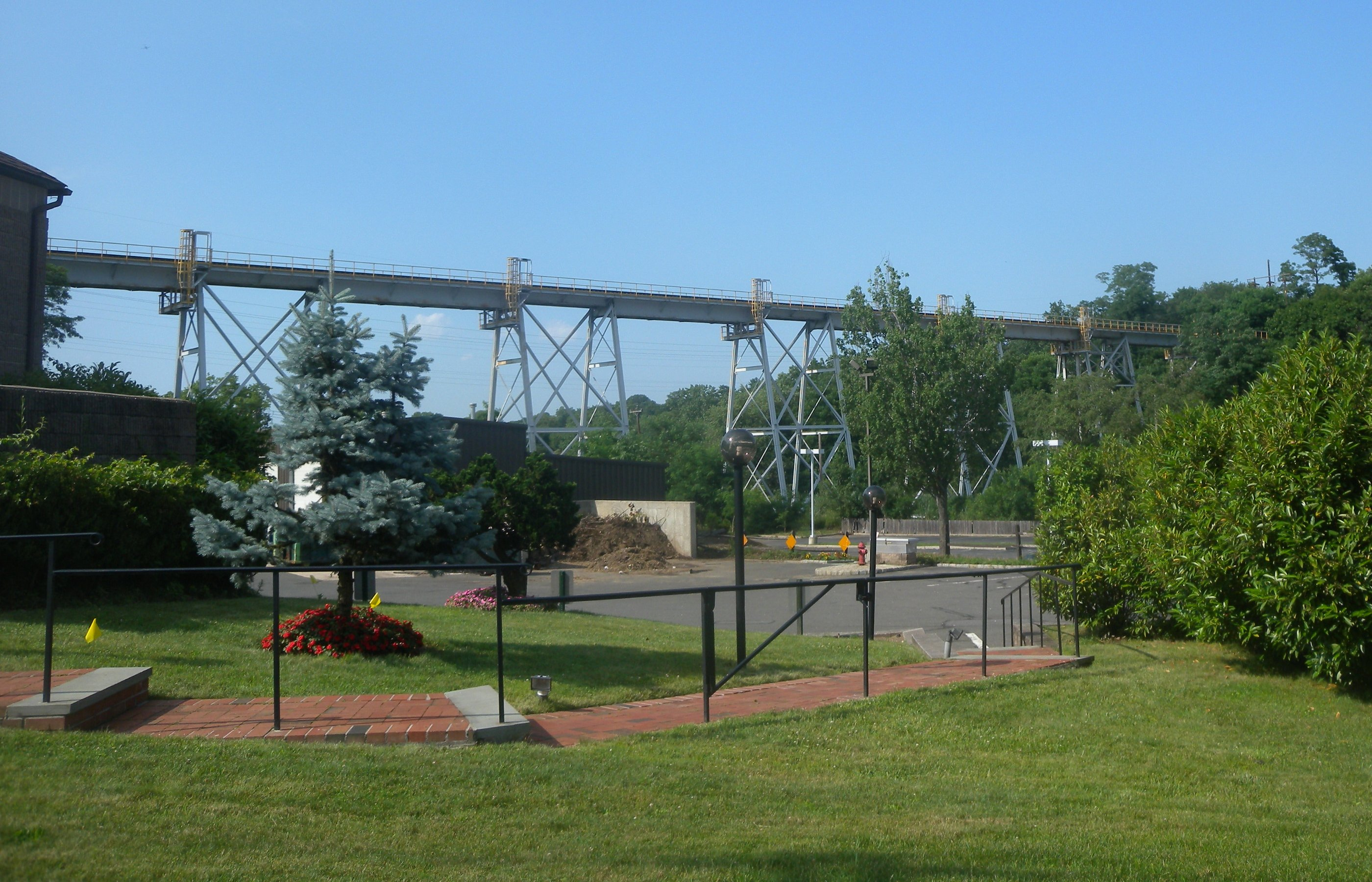
Manhasset Viaduct, viewed from East Shore Road

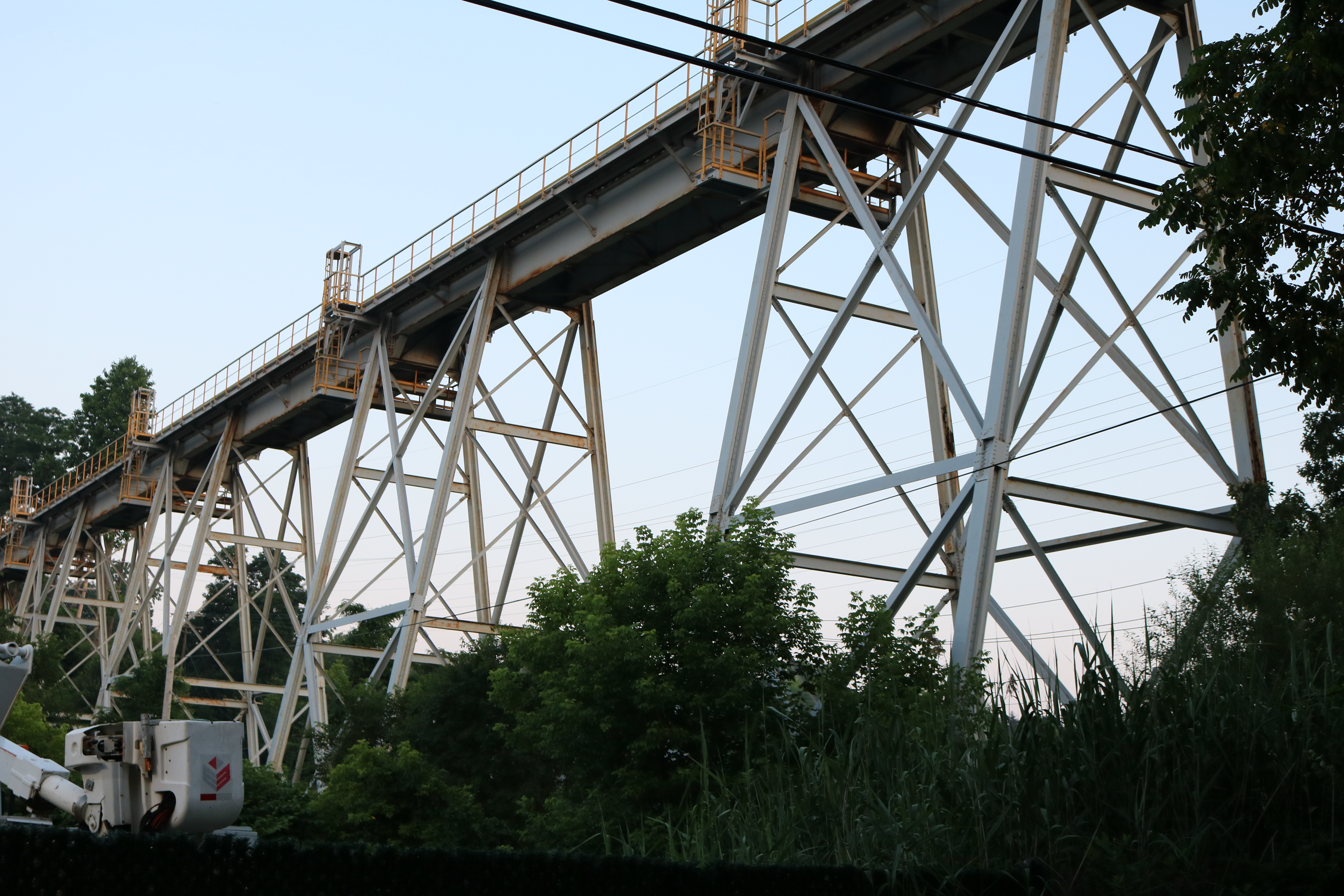
Manhasset Viaduct, viewed from below

The line has two tracks from Woodside to Great Neck and one track from east of Great Neck past Manhasset and Plandome stations to Port Washington. This often causes slight delays to one train to spread to other trains. A second track cannot be added through Manhasset and Plandome due to the proximity of businesses to the narrow right-of-way in Manhasset, and the fact that the Manhasset Viaduct, which carries the line between Great Neck and Manhasset, has only one track.

Most peak-hour trains are either local between Manhattan and Great Neck (making all stops) or express between Manhattan and Port Washington (making stops only at Bayside, Great Neck, Manhasset, Plandome station, and Port Washington, although a few morning express trains run nonstop between Great Neck and Penn Station).

Extra service is offered during the U.S. Open tennis tournament and for New York Mets home games, both of which are held in Flushing Meadows–Corona Park. These trains primarily pick up and discharge passengers at the Mets–Willets Point station between Woodside and Flushing Main Street; formerly a station used exclusively for events, Mets–Willets Point has been open full-time since April 2023.

The route also runs over the Manhasset Viaduct, a high train trestle over the marshes at the southern end of Manhasset Bay. The bridge stands 81 feet (25 m) tall and runs 678 feet (207 m) across the bay, offering a view of the Manhasset Bay. Scenes from the Hearst-produced silent film serial "The Perils of Pauline" are said to have been shot on the trestle.

There is only one grade crossing on the Port Washington Branch, located at Little Neck Parkway, at the west end of the Little Neck Station.

== History ==
=== 19th century ===
The Port Washington Branch was built by the Flushing Railroad, in 1854 from Hunters Point in Long Island City to Flushing, before the LIRR opened its line to Long Island City. It was the first non-LIRR line on Long Island. The company was reorganized in 1859 as the New York and Flushing Railroad, and established a subsidiary known as the North Shore Railroad to extend the line from Flushing to Great Neck in 1866.

Originally intending to run further east to Roslyn, Oyster Bay, and even Huntington, the NY&F's plans were thwarted by the LIRR, who reached those destinations first – as well as poor service and competition with the 1868-established Flushing and North Side Railroad. In 1869, the New York State Legislature authorized the Flushing and North Side to purchase the New York and Flushing east of the LIRR crossing at Winfield Station, while the segment between Hunters Point and Winfield was acquired by the South Side Railroad of Long Island until it was abandoned for passenger service east of what was to become the former Laurel Hill Station in 1875. Part of the right-of-way ran through what is today the Mount Zion Jewish Cemetery in Maspeth.

By 1874, all branches of the Flushing and North Side Railroad, including the Main Line to Great Neck were incorporated into the Flushing, North Shore and Central Railroad, which included the Central Railroad of Long Island. Two years later, it would become part of the Long Island Rail Road, which closed the line east of Flushing in 1881 and reopened it a year later as subsidiary known as the Long Island City and Flushing Railroad. The LIC&F was merged with the LIRR on April 2, 1889.

Despite a failed attempt to extend the line from Great Neck to Roslyn in 1882, wealthy Port Washington residents persuaded the LIRR to bring the terminus to their hometown in 1895. This required the construction of the Manhasset Viaduct over the marshes at the southern end of Manhasset Bay, which was authorized by an LIRR subsidiary called the Great Neck and Port Washington Railroad (GN&PW). According to Manhasset's website, "in 1897, a contract was given to the Carnegie Steel Company and a subsidiary, the King Iron Company, undertook the job of constructing the bridge." The trestle bridge cost about $60,000 (equal to $2,322,000 today), and the first train to cross it was on June 23, 1898. The GN&PW was disestablished as a subsidiary in 1902, and that segment simply became part of the Port Washington Branch.

=== 20th century ===
Two other early 20th-century stations built on the Port Washington Branch were in Auburndale (1901) and Plandome (1909). The branch was electrified from the Main Line to Winfield Junction by June 23, 1910, thence to Whitestone Junction – and onto the Whitestone Branch to Whitestone Landing Station – by October 22, 1912, and thence further east along the Port Washington Branch to its terminus in Port Washington by October 21, 1913. In 1910, the New York Public Service Commission approved the LIRR's application to eliminate grade crossings along the line. These projects were prerequisites for the extension of the line's second track to Great Neck and Whitestone – as well as for the electrification of the line.

Grade crossing elimination projects took place during the 1910s and 1920s in Queens and Nassau County. These grade elimination projects included unique station reconstruction in places such as Murray Hill which had a station house built over the tracks and Great Neck which had an elaborate plaza built around it. In 1929, the station at Winfield Junction was eliminated, making Woodside Station the transfer point between Main Line and Port Washington Branch trains.

Despite the elimination of the Whitestone Branch in 1932, as well as Flushing–Bridge Street station, the Flushing station on the Port Washington Branch retained the name "Flushing-Main Street station." A new infill station was built just in time for the 1939 New York World's Fair; it was then reused for the United Nations, thence the 1964 New York World's Fair and simultaneously Shea Stadium, for which it would be renamed in 1966. This station – now known as Mets–Willets Point – was the last station to be built on the line. By 1985, when Elmhurst station closed, Shea Stadium station would also become the westernmost station on the Port Washington Branch before the junction with the Main Line.

In January 1987, the station building at the Plandome station was burned to the ground by vandals, in an overnight arson attack. Following the fire, the station building was rebuilt as a more modern version of the original.

=== 21st century ===
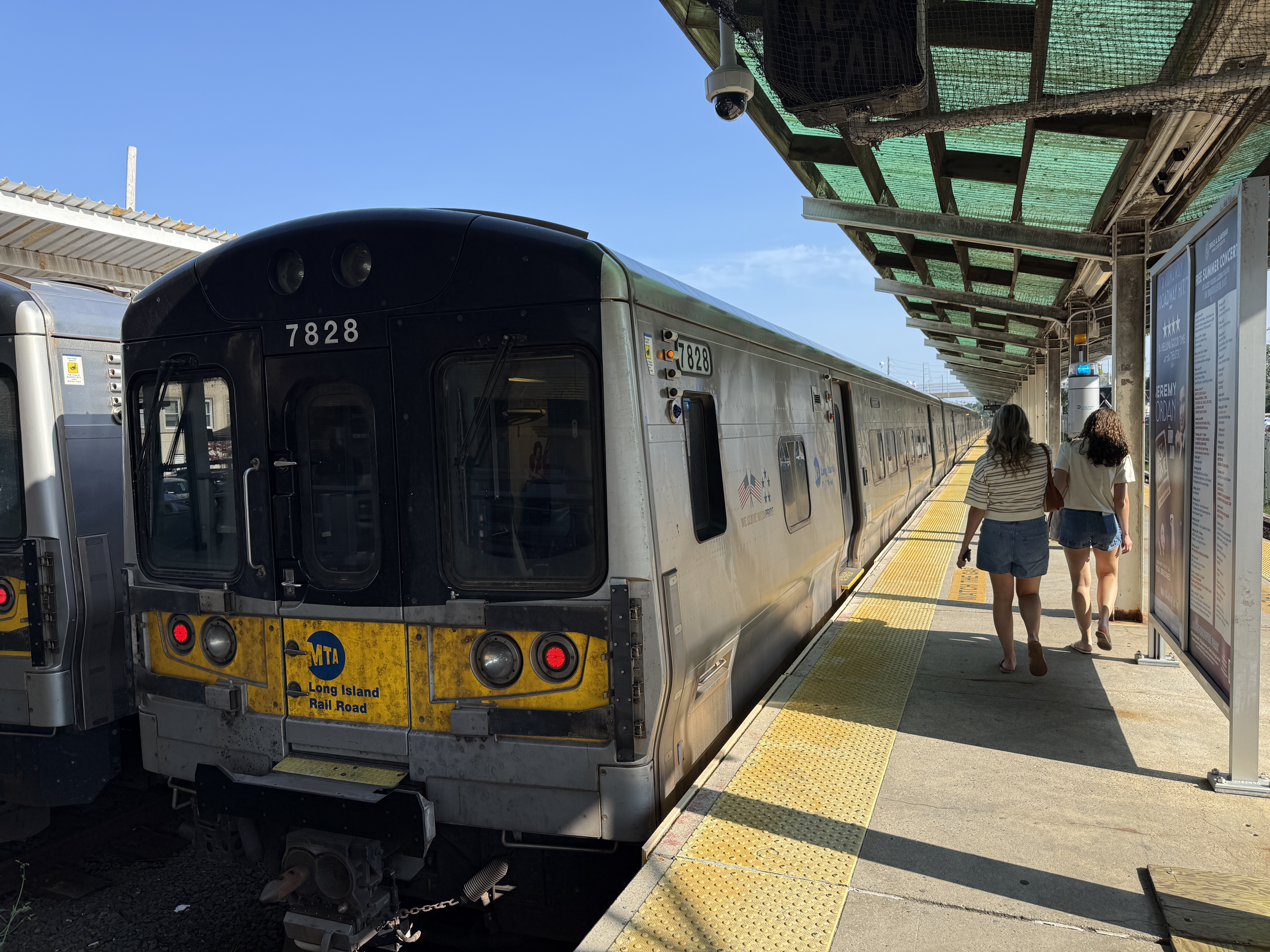
Port Washington station at the end of the Port Washington Branch

In conjunction with the East Side Access project, the MTA proposed two readiness projects that they said will increase capacity on the Port Washington Branch. The first was the extension of a pocket track east of Great Neck station, located between the station and where the line becomes single-tracked. The pocket track was extended eastward by 1,200 feet (370 m) to allow for storage of a second trainset, in addition to the one that the original pocket track could store. The construction of the pocket track was originally scheduled for completion in December 2018 at a total cost of $45.2 million. However, the completion date was pushed back several times; construction of the extended pocket track would ultimately be completed in December 2022. Alongside this project, a new bridge was built at Colonial Road near Great Neck station; it opened in May 2016 and replaced a 114-year-old span.

The second of the two readiness projects is the expansion of Port Washington Yard, next to Port Washington station. The project would allow up to nine more trains to be added to the schedule to and from Grand Central Terminal and Penn Station. As of 2017, construction was scheduled to begin in late 2020 or early 2021, at a cost of $500,000. However, this project met significant community opposition, primarily because of proposed reduction of parking spaces in the Port Washington Parking District's parking facilities near the station. As of September 2022, the MTA had not reached an agreement with the Town of North Hempstead, resulting in the project being postponed indefinitely.

On July 9, 2024, the sides agreed to a memorandum of understanding ("MOU"), under which the LIRR would study expanding the yard. That evening, a meeting – at which the MOU was unanimously approved – was held on the matter at North Hempstead Town Hall in Manhasset. At the meeting, North Hempstead Councilwoman Mariann Dalimonte (D–Port Washington) stated – in response to a question from a member of the public – that she and Town Supervisor Jennifer S. DeSena (R–Manhasset) had expressed the concern as to whether or not there would be any service improvements from this project to the Metropolitan Transportation Authority, which oversees the LIRR. Dalimonte stated that the town had asked the MTA to ensure that services would be expanded if the project is completed, but the MTA said they could not guarantee it. The project is scheduled to be completed by December 2029.

Between January and September 2025, the Webster Avenue Bridge – crossing over the Port Washington Branch between Flower Hill and Plandome Heights, at a point located roughly halfway between the Manhasset and Plandome stations – was replaced with a modern span. Originally constructed in the late 1890s, the original bridge had become structurally obsolete and unsound. The original bridge was closed on January 6 of that year, to enable crews to demolish it and build the new span in its place; Plandome Pond Park – located adjacent to the bridge at its west end in Plandome Heights – was used as a staging area for the construction work. The replacement span opened in September 2025; the project was completed ahead of schedule and $7.6 million under budget.

== Stations ==
West of Woodside, all trips go on to terminate at Penn Station or Grand Central.

| Zone | Location | Station name | Miles (km) from Long Island City | Date opened | Date closed | Connections and notes |
|---|---|---|---|---|---|---|
| 1 | Woodside, Queens | Woodside | 3.1 (5.0) | 1869 | | Long Island Rail Road: ■ City Terminal Zone; New York City Subway: (at 61st Street–Woodside); New York City Bus: Q32; MTA Bus: Q18, Q53 SBS, Q70 SBS |
| 1 | Maspeth, Queens | Winfield Junction | | 1854 | 1929 | |
| 1 | Elmhurst, Queens | Elmhurst | | 1855 | 1985 | Originally named Newtown |
| 1 | Corona, Queens | | | | | |
| 1 | Corona, Queens | Corona | | 1853 | 1964 | Originally named Fashion Race Course, then West Flushing |
| 1 | Corona, Queens | West Flushing | | 1854 | | |
| 1 | Corona, Queens | Mets–Willets Point | 6.7 (10.8) | 1939 | | New York City Subway: (at Mets–Willets Point); New York City Bus: Q90; Originally named World's Fair, then United Nations, then World's Fair again, then Shea Stadium. |
| 3 | Flushing, Queens | Flushing–Main Street | 7.5 (12.1) | 1854 | | New York City Subway: (at Flushing–Main Street); New York City Bus: Q12, Q13, Q15, Q16, Q17, Q20, Q27, Q44 SBS, Q58, Q61, Q90, Q98; MTA Bus: Q19, Q25, Q26, Q28, Q50, Q63, Q65, Q66; Nassau Inter-County Express: n20G, n20x Originally named Flushing |
| 3 | Flushing, Queens | Murray Hill | 8.4 (13.5) | 1889 | | New York City Bus: Q13, Q15; Nassau Inter-County Express: n20G, n20x |
| 3 | Flushing, Queens | Broadway | 9.2 (14.8) | 1866 | | New York City Bus: Q12, Q13; MTA Bus: Q28; Nassau Inter-County Express: n20G, n20x Originally named Flushing–Broadway |
| 3 | Auburndale, Queens | Auburndale | 9.9 (15.9) | 1901 | | New York City Bus: Q12, Q13, Q76; MTA Bus: Q28; Nassau Inter-County Express: n20G, n20x |
| 3 | Bayside, Queens | Bayside | 10.8 (17.4) | 1886 | | New York City Bus: Q12, Q13, Q31; Nassau Inter-County Express: n20G, n20x Originally named Bay Side |
| 3 | Douglaston–Little Neck, Queens | Douglaston | 12.1 (19.5) | 1866 | | New York City Bus: Q12; Nassau Inter-County Express: n20G, n20x Originally named Little Neck |
| 3 | Douglaston–Little Neck, Queens | Little Neck | 12.7 (20.4) | 1870 | | New York City Bus: Q12, Q36; Nassau Inter-County Express: n20G, n20x |
| 4 | Great Neck Plaza | Great Neck | 13.8 (22.2) | 1866 | | Nassau Inter-County Express: n20G, n20H, n21, n25, n26, n57, n58 Originally named Brookdale |
| 4 | Manhasset | Manhasset | 15.4 (24.8) | 1899 | | Nassau Inter-County Express: n20H, n21, n20x |
| 4 | Plandome | Plandome | 16.5 (26.6) | 1909 | | |
| 4 | Port Washington | Port Washington | 18.1 (29.1) | 1898 | | Nassau Inter-County Express: n23 |

== See also ==
- History of the Long Island Rail Road
- Whitestone Branch
