= Flushing–Main Street station (LIRR) =

Long Island Rail Road station in Queens, New York

Flushing Main Street
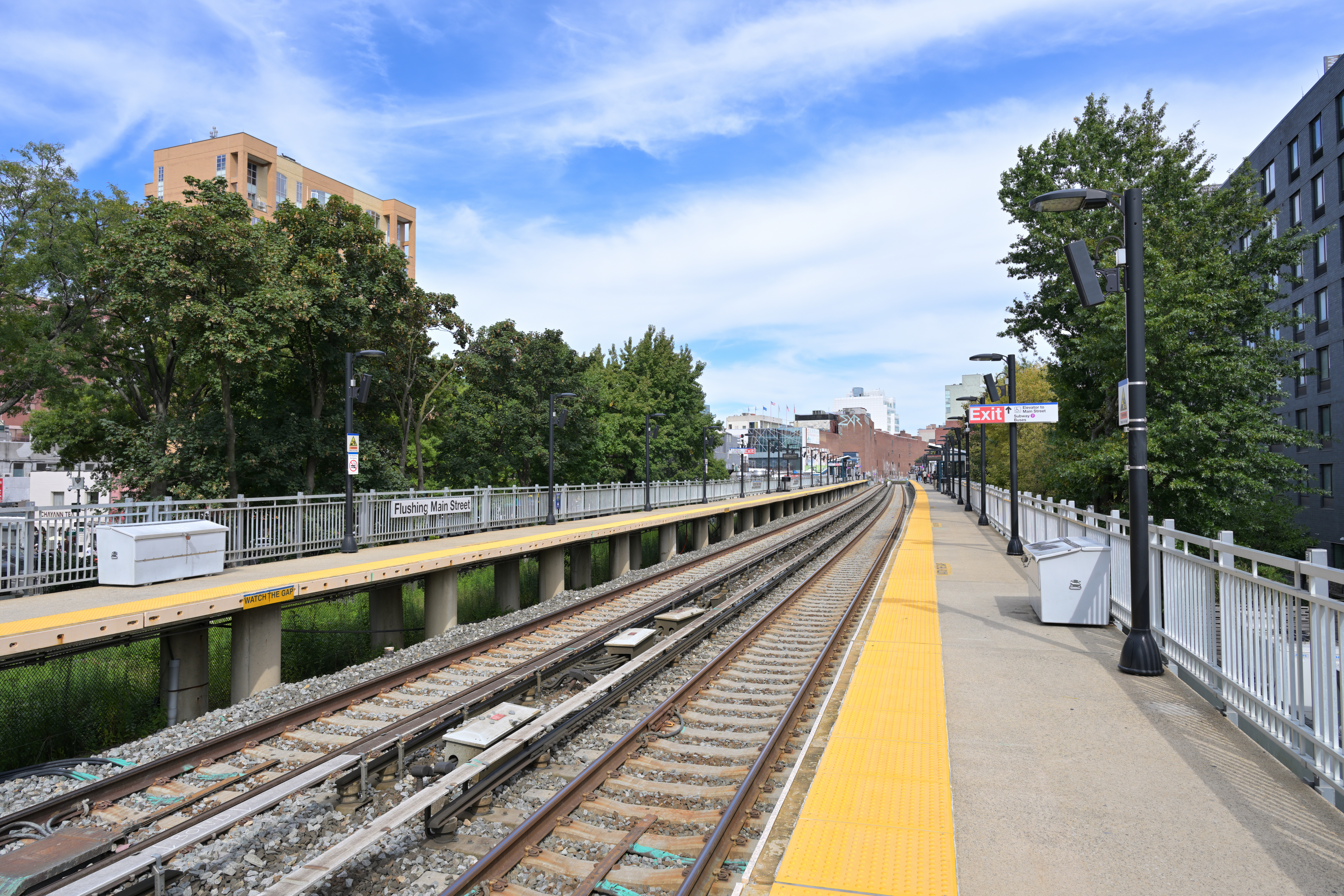
- View east from Platform B, towards Port Washington

General information
- Location: Main Street and 41st Avenue; Flushing, Queens, New York
- Coordinates: 40.757989°N 73.831086°W
- Owner: Long Island Rail Road
- Line: Port Washington Branch
- Distance: 7.5 mi (12.1 km) from Long Island City
- Platforms: 2 side platforms
- Tracks: 2
- Connections: New York City Subway: trains at Flushing–Main Street; NYCT Bus: Q12, Q13, Q15, Q16, Q17, Q20, Q27, Q44 SBS, Q58, Q61, Q90, Q98; MTA Bus: Q19, Q25, Q26, Q28, Q50, Q63, Q65, Q66; NICE Bus: n20G, n20X

Construction
- Parking: Yes (metered)
- Accessible: Yes
- Architect: Urbahn Architects

Other information
- Station code: FLS
- Fare zone: 3

History
- Opened: June 26, 1854 (NY&F)
- Rebuilt: 1865, 1870, 1913, 1958, 2018
- Electrified: October 22, 1912; 750 V (DC) third rail
- Former names: Flushing (1853–1870)

Passengers
- 2012—2014: 2,224
- Rank: 50 of 125

Services
Preceding station	Long Island Rail Road	Following station
Mets–Willets Point toward Penn Station or Grand Central	Port Washington Branch	Murray Hill toward Port Washington
Location

Flushing–Main Street is a station on the Long Island Rail Road's Port Washington Branch in the Flushing neighborhood of Queens, New York City. The station is located at Main Street and 41st Avenue, off Kissena Boulevard.

== History ==
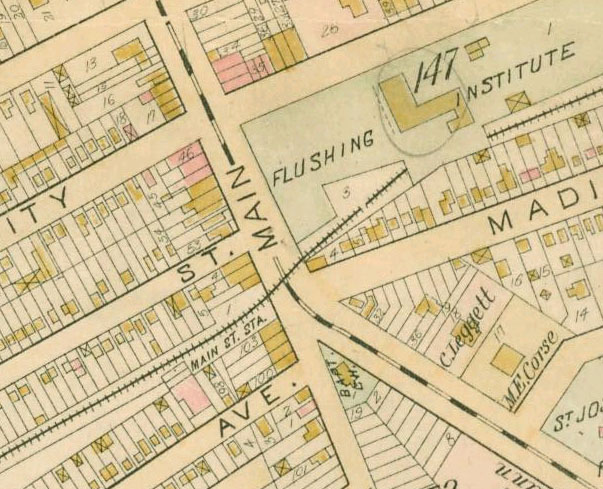
1891 map of area around station

=== 19th century ===
The Flushing–Main Street station was originally built in December 1853 as the Flushing station by the New York and Flushing Railroad, but not opened until June 26, 1854. Flushing served as the terminus of the NY&F until October 30, 1864 when a subsidiary known as the North Shore Railroad extended it to Great Neck, and it was burned in order to prepare for a second station that was built between January and February 1865. In 1868, the station and the rest of the line were acquired by the Flushing and North Side Railroad, which razed the second station in 1870 and built a third station between October and November 1870. The station was renamed after both Flushing and Main Street, in order to distinguish itself from the former Flushing Bridge Street station that ran along the F&NS's Whitestone Branch, which was abandoned by the LIRR in 1932.

During the mid-1870s, the station and the rest of the line merged with the Central Railroad of Long Island to form the Flushing, North Shore and Central Railroad, and then became part of the Port Washington Branch of the Long Island Rail Road, which also used the station as the eastern terminus of the White Line between 1873 and 1876.

=== 20th century ===
Shortly after the line was electrified on October 22, 1912, the station was abandoned on November 11, 1912, as part of an effort by the Long Island Rail Road to bring the Port Washington Branch above and below street level depending on the location.

In Flushing, the station was elevated along with the rest of the tracks on October 4, 1913. Prior to that point, the line ran at grade and went through a tunnel under a girls' school, just east of where the Main Street overpass stands today. The tunnel and the school were torn down to build the overpass and the open cut through which the line now runs. In 1958, the elevated track level building was razed and replaced with a street level ticket office. Sheltered platforms exist on both sides of the tracks in the former station's place, and the sidewalks beneath the bridge serve local businesses.

=== 21st century ===
The Metropolitan Transportation Authority extensively renovated the station in the 2010s, bringing it into compliance with the 1990 Americans With Disabilities Act. According to the description of the $24.6 million project, one elevator was built from each platform to street level, and various components of the station were renovated. A one-story commercial building on the west side of Main Street was demolished and replaced by a station house with an elevator, which provided more direct access to the westbound platform.

On October 28, 2013, the MTA held a public hearing on the proposed acquisition of private property at 40-36 Main Street in Flushing for the purpose of adding an elevator intended for the rebuilt station. By June 2015, design had been completed and one of the two parcels of private property, a food stall, had been acquired. The MTA expected to complete the eminent domain acquisition of Ou-Jang Supermarket's 40-36 Main Street property by summer 2015; the supermarket objected to the amount offered by the MTA, $974,592. On January 6, 2016, filings in Queens County Superior Court showed that MTA and the supermarket reached a settlement of $2,236,600, of which $1.9 million was the cash purchase price and the remainder represented rent to be paid by MTA on behalf of the supermarket at its new location. The MTA began in July 2016 and planned to complete the project by the 4th quarter of 2017. In December 2015, the MTA had put the project out for competitive bidding with a proposal due date of that December 9.

On July 22, 2016, the ticket office was closed as part of the two-year renovation project along with the staircase to the eastbound platform with a temporary staircase and platform extension providing access. The current staircase to the city-bound platform was closed for renovation upon the opening of a new staircase and elevator. Completion of the project was set for early 2018; as of summer 2018, the elevators had been completed. The rebuilt station was designed by Urbahn Architects.

== Station layout ==
The station has two high-level side platforms, each 10 cars long.

P Platform level	Platform A, side platform
P Platform level	Track 1	← Port Washington Branch toward Penn Station or Grand Central Madison (Mets–Willets Point)
P Platform level	Track 2	Port Washington Branch toward Great Neck or Port Washington (Murray Hill) →
P Platform level	Platform B, side platform
G	Ground level	Exit/entrance and buses

== Bus service ==
In addition to connecting with the nearby subway station of the same name, Flushing–Main Street serves as a major bus-to-rail interchange in Queens, with over 20 bus routes running through or terminating in the area as of 2015.

Route	Operator	Stop location	North/West Terminal	South/East Terminal	via	notes
MTA-operated bus routes
Q12	NYCT	Roosevelt Avenue (near Lippmann Plaza)	Little Neck		Northern Boulevard	
Q13 Rush	NYCT	39th Avenue (near Lippmann Plaza)	Fort Totten		Sanford Avenue, Northern Boulevard, Bell Boulevard	Limited-stop "rush" service until Bell Boulevard, then local stops
Q15	NYCT	Roosevelt Avenue (near Lippmann Plaza)	Beechhurst		41st Avenue, 150th Street	
Q16	NYCT	39th Avenue (near Lippmann Plaza)	Fort Totten		Bayside Avenue	
Q17	NYCT	Main Street	Jamaica–Merrick Boulevard		Kissena Boulevard, Horace Harding Expressway, 188th Street, Hillside Avenue	
Q19	MTA Bus	Roosevelt Avenue (west of Main Street)	Astoria		Northern Boulevard, Astoria Boulevard	
Q20	NYCT	Main Street	College Point	Jamaica–Merrick Boulevard	20th Avenue, Main Street, Archer Avenue	
Q25	MTA Bus	Main Street	College Point	Jamaica–LIRR Station	127th Street, Kissena Boulevard, Parsons Boulevard	
Q26	MTA Bus	Roosevelt Avenue (near Lippmann Plaza)	College Point	Auburndale	Parsons Boulevard, 46th Avenue, Hollis Court Boulevard, College Point Boulevard	
Q27 Rush	NYCT	Main Street	Cambria Heights		Kissena Boulevard, Parsons Boulevard, 46th Avenue, 48th Avenue, Springfield Boulevard	Limited-stop "rush" service until Utopia Parkway, then local stops
Q28 Rush	MTA Bus	39th Avenue (near Lippmann Plaza)	Bay Terrace Shopping Center		Northern Boulevard, Crocheron Avenue, 32nd Avenue, Corporal Kennedy Street	Limited-stop "rush" service until 162nd Street, then local stops
Q44 SBS	NYCT	Main Street	Bronx Zoo–West Farms Square	Jamaica–Merrick Boulevard	Cross Bronx Expressway, Parsons Boulevard, Union Street, Main Street, Archer Avenue	Select Bus Service
Q50 LTD	MTA Bus	Main Street	Co-op City, Bronx (Rush hours) Pelham Bay Park (Off-Peak hours)		Whitestone Expressway, Hutchinson River Parkway, Bruckner Boulevard, Co-op City Boulevard	Limited-stop service
Q58	NYCT	41st Road	Ridgewood Terminal		College Point Boulevard, Corona Avenue, Grand Avenue, Fresh Pond Road	
Q61 LTD	NYCT	Roosevelt Avenue (near Lippmann Plaza)	Beechhurst		Willets Point Boulevard, Francis Lewis Bouevard, 154th Street	Limited-stop service
Q63 Rush	MTA Bus	Roosevelt Avenue (west of Main Street)	Long Island City–Queens Plaza		Northern Boulevard, Jackson Avenue	Limited-stop "rush" service until 114th Street, then local stops until Standard Lane and "rush" stops until Queens Plaza
Q65	MTA Bus	Main Street	Jamaica–LIRR Station		Sanford Avenue, 164th Street	
Q66	MTA Bus	Roosevelt Avenue (west of Main Street)	Long Island City–Queens Plaza		Northern Boulevard, 35th Avenue, 21st Street	
Q90 LTD	NYCT	Roosevelt Avenue (west of Main Street)	LaGuardia Airport		Roosevelt Avenue, 108th Street, Ditmars Boulevard	Limited-stop service
Q98 LTD	NYCT	41st Road	Ridgewood Terminal		College Point Boulevard, Horace Harding Expressway, Queens Boulevard, Grand Avenue, Fresh Pond Road	Limited-stop service
Nassau Inter-County Express (NICE)-operated bus routes
n20G	NICE Bus	Roosevelt Avenue (near Lippmann Plaza)	Great Neck LIRR Station		Northern Boulevard	Transfer at Great Neck for n20H to Hicksville
n20X	NICE Bus	Roosevelt Avenue (near Lippmann Plaza)	Roslyn Clock Tower		Northern Boulevard	Rush hours only

== Gallery ==
Flushing-Main Street (LIRR)

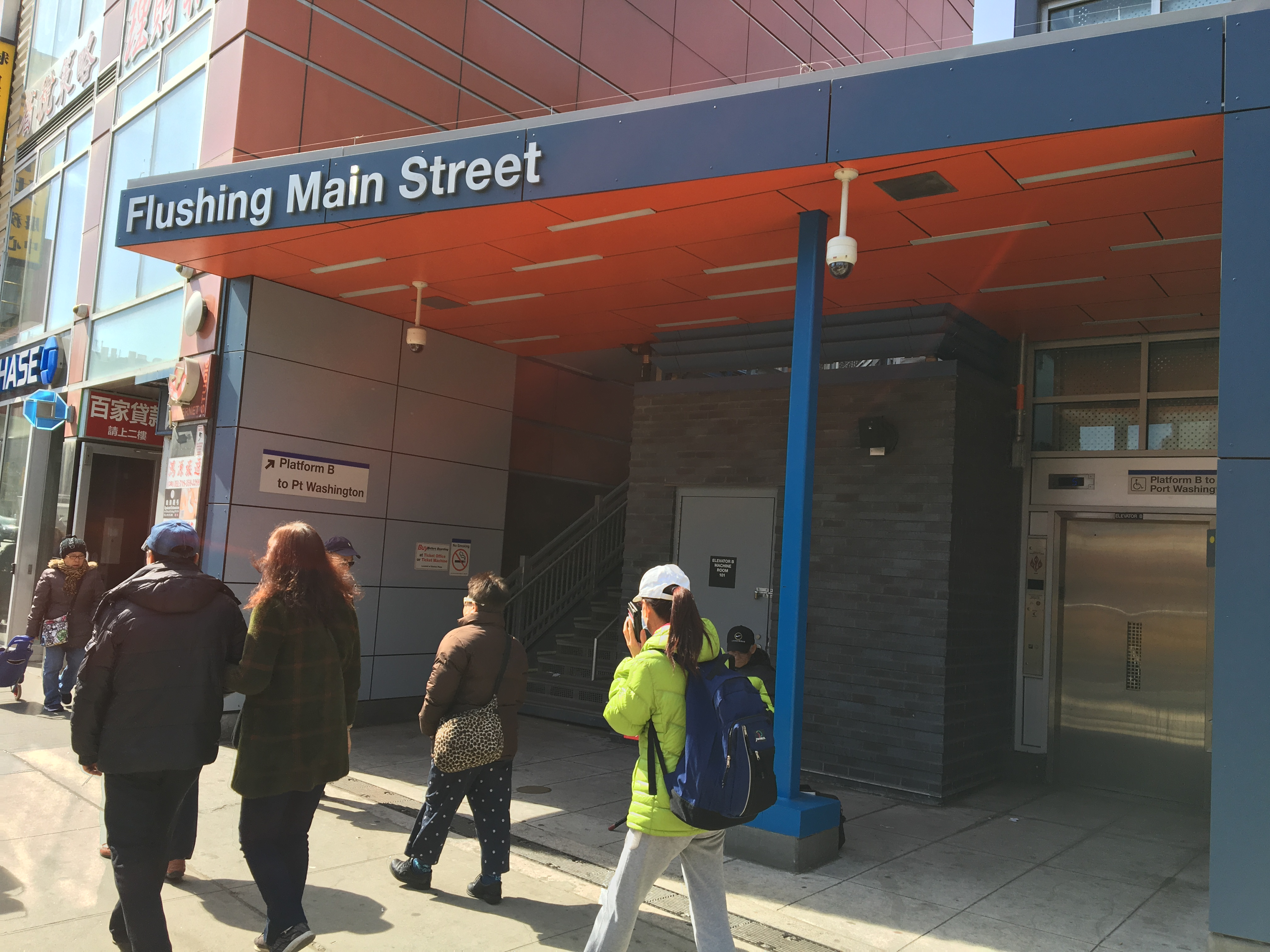
Entrance of Flushing Main Street station (LIRR) - March 2019

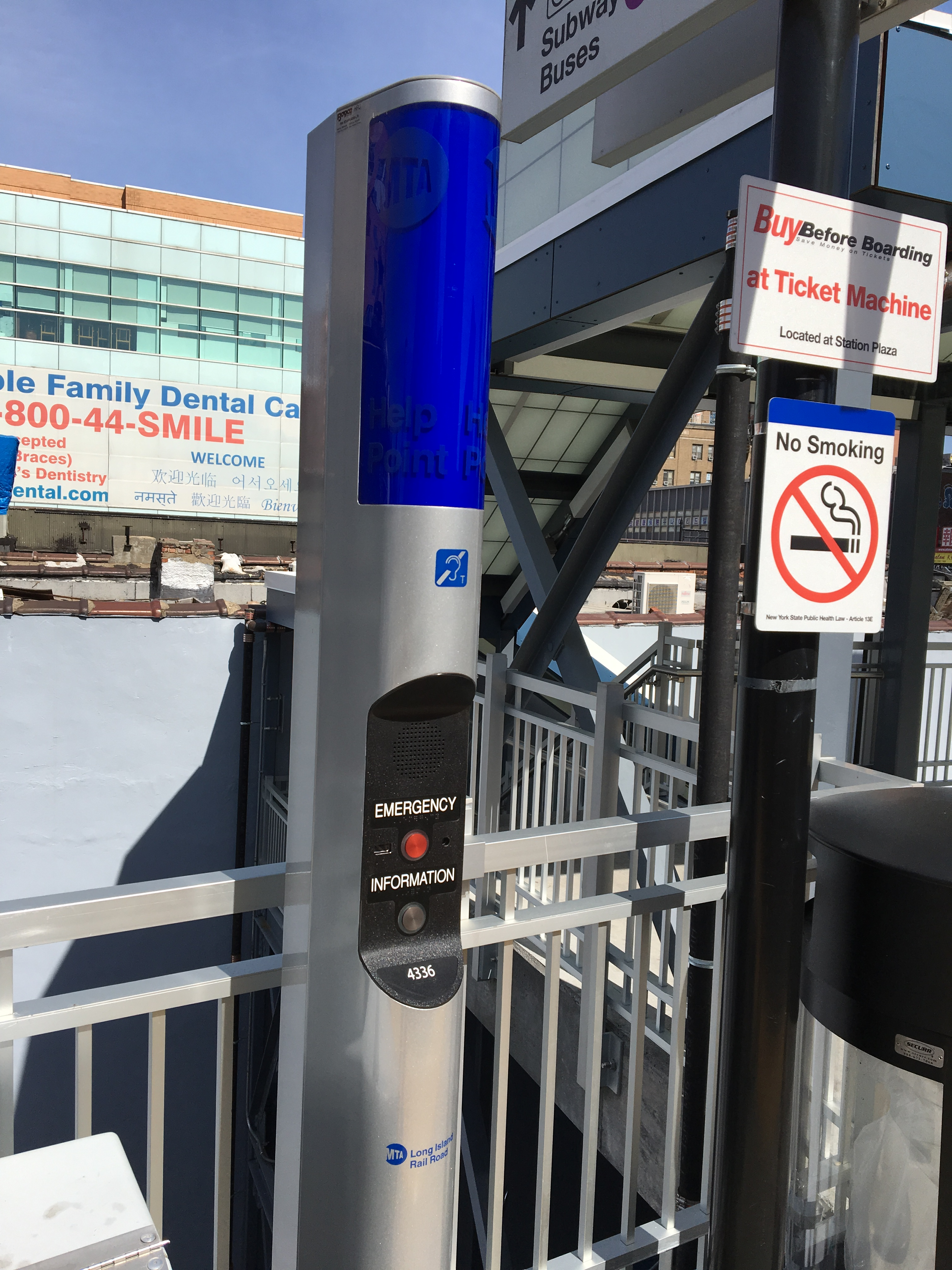
Help Point at Flushing Main Street (LIRR) station

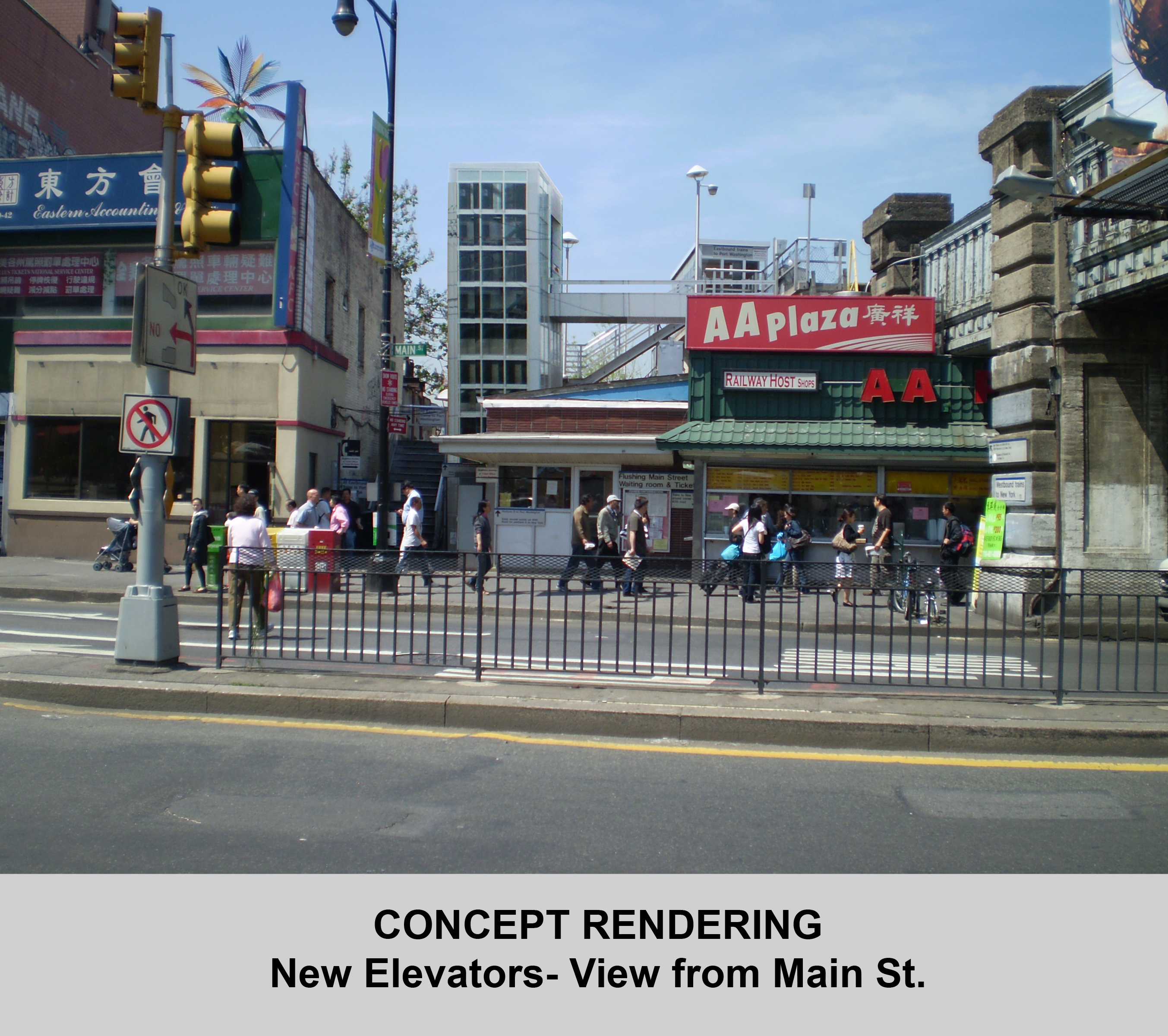
Rendering for planned elevator at Flushing station (street view)

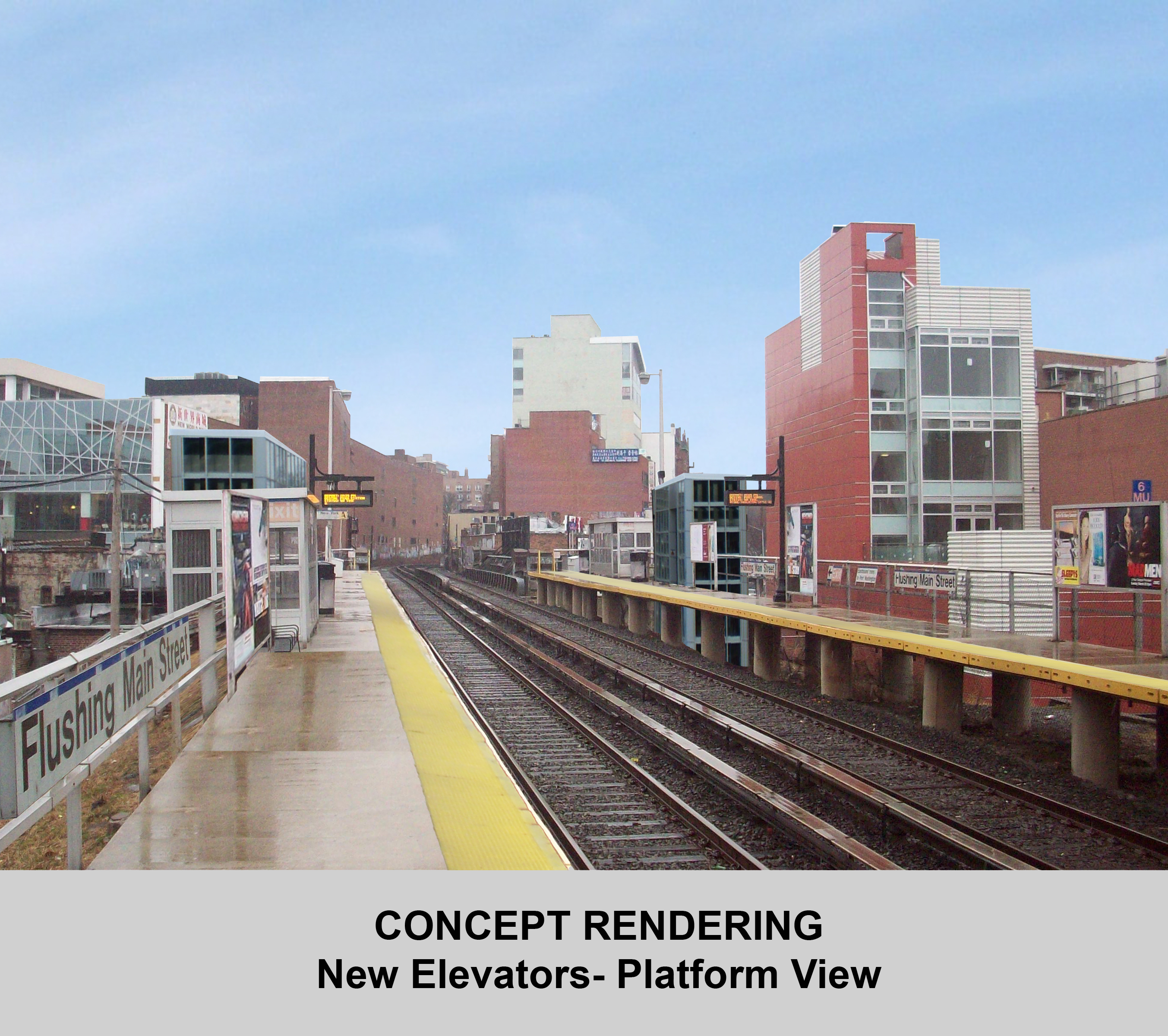
Rendering for planned elevator at Flushing station (platform view)

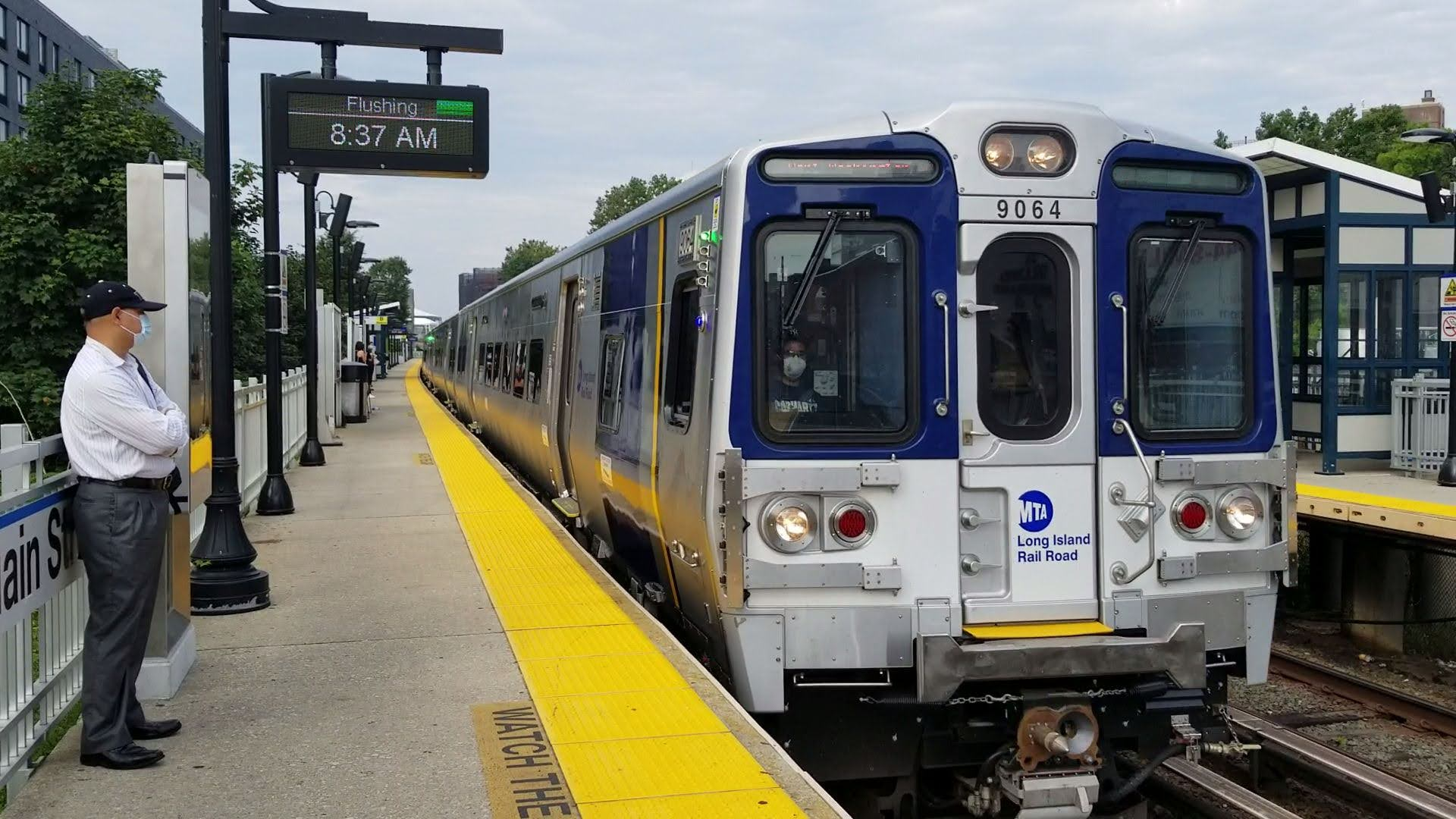
A Port Washington Branch train enters the station
