= Mets–Willets Point station (LIRR) =

Long Island Rail Road station in Queens, New York

Mets–Willets Point
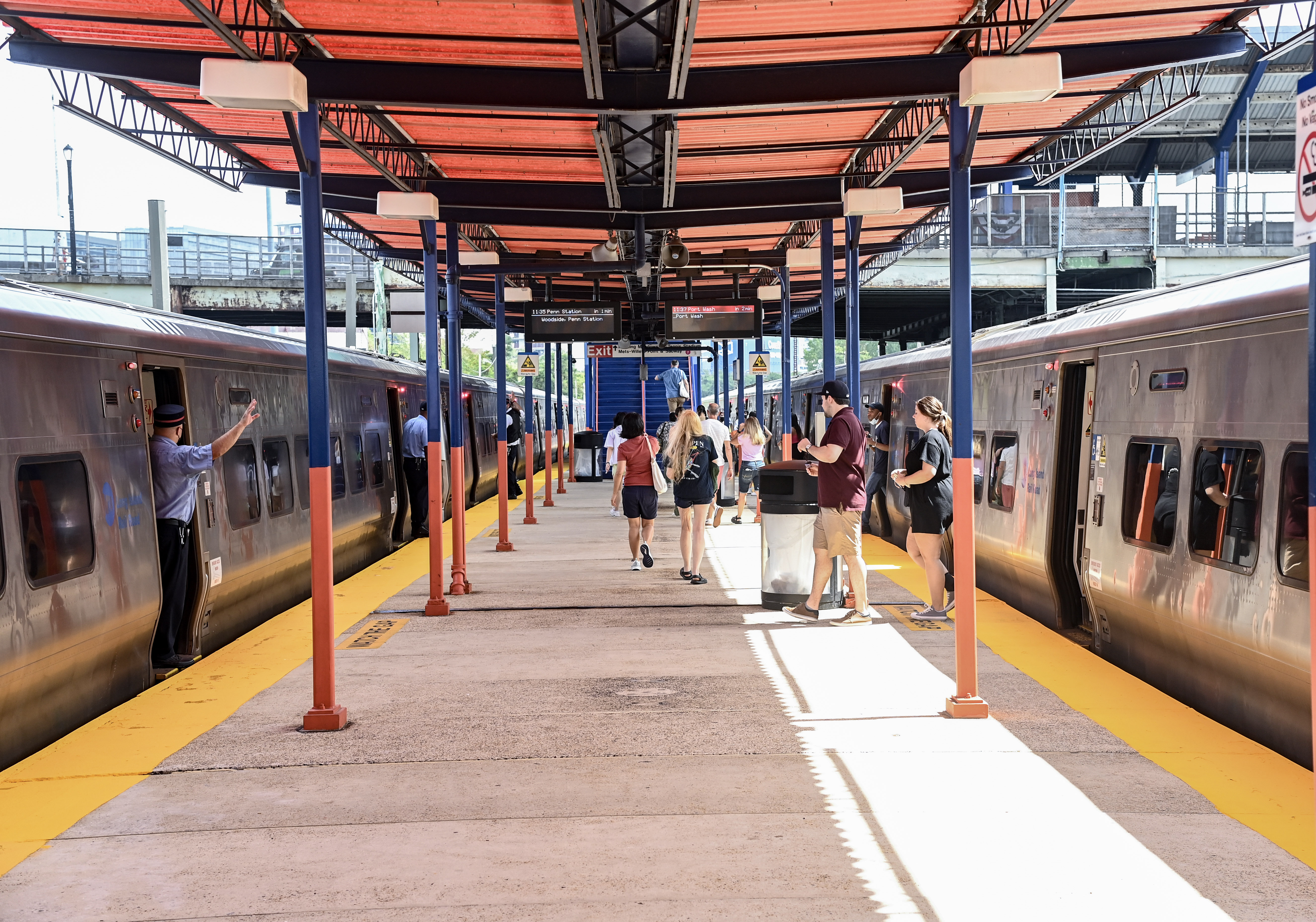
- The station, as seen in 2022

General information
- Location: Meridian Road (Flushing Meadows Park); Queens, New York
- Coordinates: 40.7525°N 73.8437°W
- Owner: Long Island Rail Road
- Line: Port Washington Branch
- Distance: 6.7 mi (10.8 km) from Long Island City
- Platforms: 3 island platforms
- Tracks: 6
- Connections: New York City Subway: trains at Mets–Willets Point; NYCT Bus: Q90

Construction
- Accessible: No; accessibility planned

Other information
- Station code: SSM
- Fare zone: 1

History
- Opened: 1939
- Rebuilt: 1964
- Electrified: 750 V (DC) third rail
- Former names: World's Fair (1939–1946); United Nations (1946–1952); World's Fair (1961–1966); Shea Stadium (1966–2008)

Passengers
- 2012—2014: 0 (seasonal service)
- Rank: 125 of 125 (seasonal service)

Services
Preceding station	Long Island Rail Road	Following station
Woodside toward Penn Station or Grand Central	Port Washington Branch	Flushing–Main Street toward Port Washington
Location

Mets–Willets Point (formerly Shea Stadium) is a station on the Long Island Rail Road's Port Washington Branch in Flushing Meadows–Corona Park, Queens, New York City. Prior to 2021, the station was normally open only during New York Mets home games, the U.S. Open tennis tournament, major events, and emergencies. The station has been served full-time since 2023.

Although Mets–Willets Point was originally not part of CityTicket, it was added to the CityTicket program in August 2011, and fares are collected before boarding during games and special events.

== History ==
Attractions and geographical features of Flushing Meadows–Corona Park
Attractions and geographical features of Flushing Meadows–Corona Park:
1 Citi Field
2 Etihad Park (under construction)
3 Flushing Meadows Carousel and Queens Zoo
4 Flushing Meadows Corona Park Aquatics Center
5 Flushing River and Creek
6 Meadow Lake and Hong Kong Dragon Boat Festival
7 Metropolitan Park (planned) and Shea Stadium (demolished)
8 Mets–Willets Point subway station
9 Mets–Willets Point LIRR station
10 National Tennis Center and United States Pavilion (demolished)
11 New York Hall of Science
12 New York State Pavilion and Queens Theatre
13 Queens Botanical Garden
14 Queens Museum
15 Queens Night Market
16 Terrace on the Park
17 Unisphere
18 Willow Lake
19 World's Fair subway station (demolished)

The station, which opened in time for the 1939 New York World's Fair, included a modernistic structure above the tracks that could accommodate up to 18,000 passengers per hour. Resembling an airplane hangar, it combined both Art Deco and Bauhaus features, and was also in close proximity to the Railroads on Parade exhibit.

The inaugural run of the Seaboard Air Line Railroad's Silver Meteor began at this station on February 2, 1939, having been dedicated at the New York World's Fair. Future runs of the train began their trips at New York Penn Station.

Between 1946 and 1952, the station was known as United Nations Station. Flushing Meadows-Corona Park was the temporary site of the U.N. General Assembly, and had shuttle buses to their temporary headquarters in Lake Success at the time. Once the UN moved to its permanent home on the east side of Midtown-Manhattan, the station closed. However, it was reopened again with its original name on January 11, 1961, and the 1939 World's Fair ramp was expanded for the 1964 New York World's Fair to connect the Flushing Meadows–Corona Park to Shea Stadium, which opened that same year (though it was not part of the World's Fair). After the World's Fair closed in 1965, the station was named for Shea Stadium in 1966.

When the Elmhurst station closed in 1985, Shea Stadium station became the westernmost station on the Port Washington Branch before merging with the LIRR Main Line at Winfield Junction. As of 2020, a portion of track from the Whitestone Branch, which diverged just east of the station, was still visible next to the westbound track.

Following the 2009 closure and demolition of Shea Stadium, the Metropolitan Transportation Authority renamed the station to Mets–Willets Point, matching the name of the adjoining subway station and omitting the corporate-sponsored name, Citi Field, associated with the current stadium. The MTA was unsuccessful in achieving a similar naming rights deal and would not post the name for free. Had the naming rights deal been achieved, the station would have been known as Citi Field.

Prior to 2021, the station would normally be open only during New York Mets home games at Citi Field (Shea Stadium prior to 2009), the U.S. Open tennis tournament at the USTA National Tennis Center, major events such as concerts, and during emergencies. In February 2021, the station began to be open full time and was served by all trains while Citi Field was being used as a COVID-19 vaccination site. Full-time service ended after the COVID-19 vaccination site closed. After receiving feedback from customers, the MTA decided to resume 24/7 service at the station in April 2023, with trains serving the station every 30 minutes in each direction.

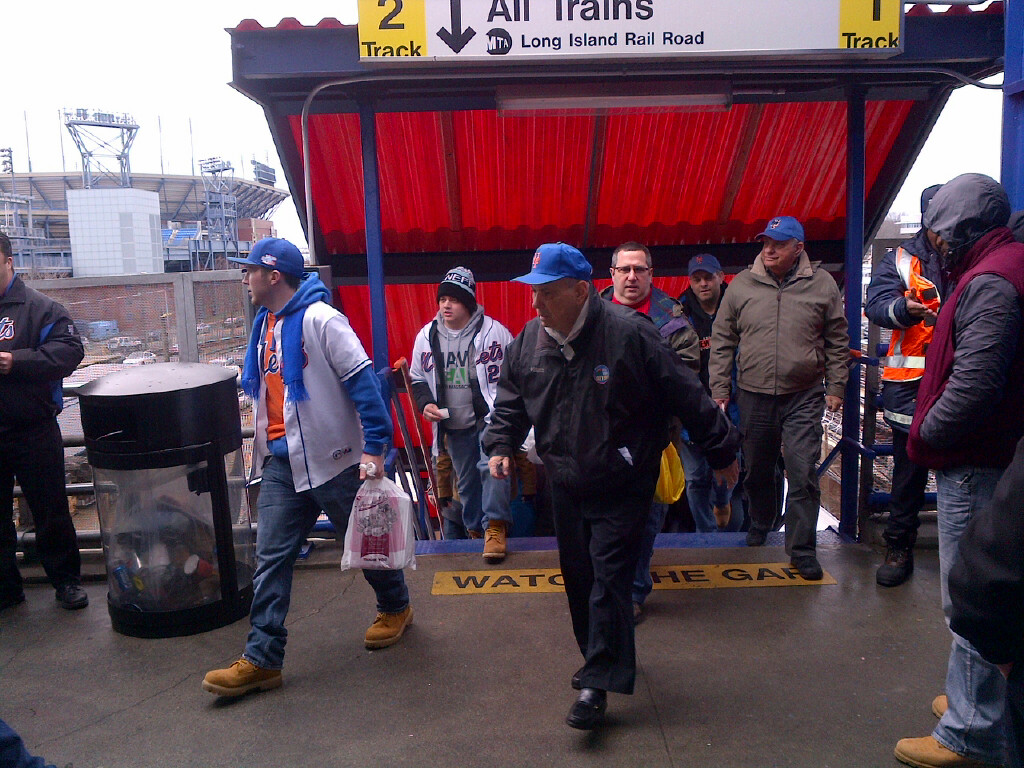
Fans ascending from the platform to the walkway to Citi Field, during the Mets' 2014 Home Opener game.

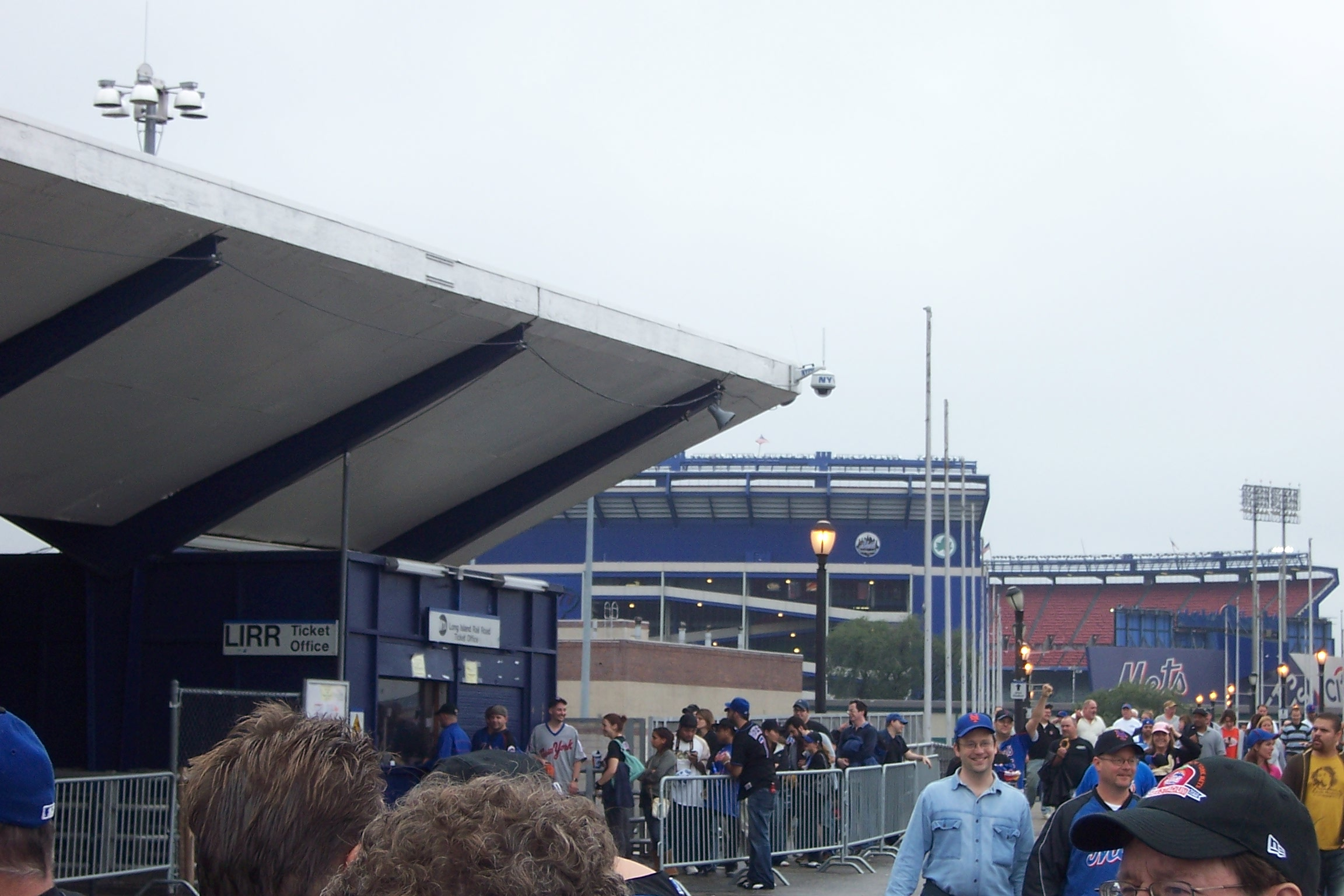
Fans streaming into the station following the conclusion of a September 2008 Mets game at the former Shea Stadium.

=== Planned renovation and accessibility ===
In September 2014, the MTA announced renovation plans for the Mets–Willets Point LIRR station, which would see its current active platform (see below) extend in length from eight cars to 12 cars, including the installation of an elevator, which would connect to the New York City Parks Department boardwalk leading to Flushing Meadows–Corona Park, making the station fully ADA accessible. The project was scheduled to be completed in time for the 2016 baseball season, but as of 2020, the elevator still had not been installed.

==== Cancelled AirTrain station ====
On January 20, 2015, New York Governor Andrew Cuomo announced a plan to build AirTrain LaGuardia, a people mover running along the Grand Central Parkway and connecting the station to LaGuardia Airport. The project would have included the renovation of the Willets Point LIRR station, which would have become fully accessible. In May 2017, Parsons Brinckerhoff was hired to design the AirTrain; at the time, construction was projected to start in 2019. Transportation advocates criticized the plan as being overly roundabout. In October 2021, Kathy Hochul, who succeeded Cuomo as governor after his resignation, directed PANYNJ to pause the AirTrain project. The PANYNJ presented 14 alternatives in March 2022, and the AirTrain LGA project was canceled in March 2023 in favor of increased bus service.

== Station layout ==
The Port Washington Branch has six tracks at this station. This station has three high-level island platforms. The north platform, adjacent to Tracks 1 and 2, the two main tracks, is eight cars long. The center platform, adjacent to Tracks 3 and 4, is twelve cars long. The south platform, adjacent to Tracks 5 and 6, is six cars long. Only the north platform is currently in use; the other tracks have not been used for regular passenger services since the 1964–65 World's Fair. The stairwells leading to the other platforms are blocked off and the platforms are in disrepair. The other tracks nonetheless comprise Shea Yard and are used for train storage, although only tracks 3 and 4 are regularly used; tracks 5 and 6 are rusted over. The platforms are decorated in blue and orange – the Mets team colors. East and west of the station, the six tracks merge into two tracks.

M	Mezzanine	Walkway to Flushing Meadows–Corona Park, Tennis Center, Citi Field, Roosevelt Avenue, trains
P Platform level
P Platform level	Track 1	← Port Washington Branch toward Penn Station or Grand Central Madison (Woodside)
P Platform level	Island platform, doors will open on the left or right
P Platform level	Track 2	Port Washington Branch toward Great Neck or Port Washington (Flushing–Main Street) →
P Platform level	Track 3	← No regular service →
P Platform level	Island platform, not in service
P Platform level	Track 4	← No regular service →
P Platform level	Track 5	← No regular service →
P Platform level	Island platform, not in service
P Platform level	Track 6	← No regular service →
