= Winfield Junction station =

Train station in New York City (1854–1929)

Winfield Junction
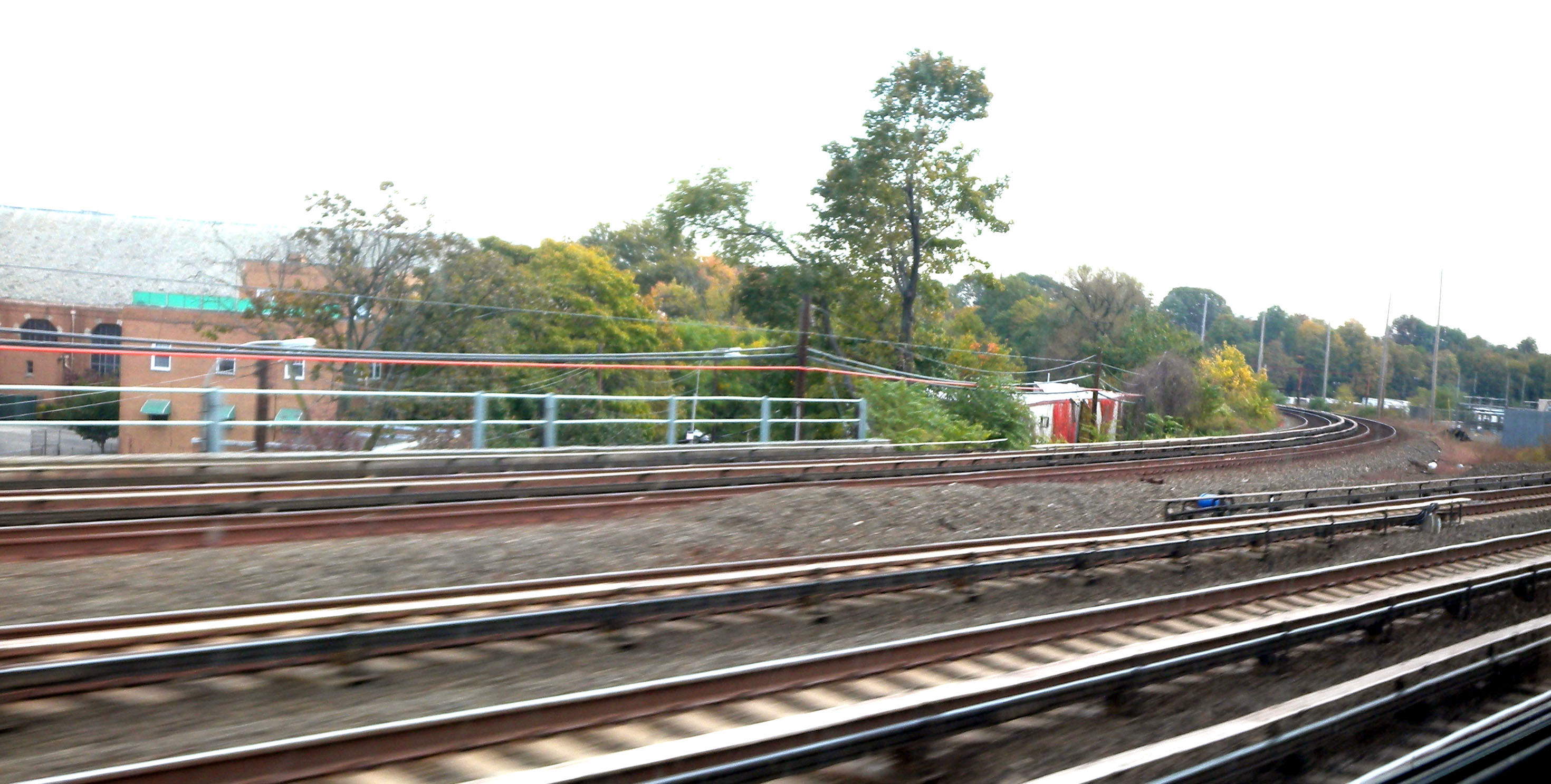
- Winfield Junction as seen in 2009

General information
- Location: 50th Avenue and 69th Street; Maspeth, Queens
- Coordinates: 40.736973°N 73.895983°W; Original Location
- Owner: Long Island Rail Road
- Line: Main Line
- Platforms: 2 side platform
- Tracks: 2

Other information
- Station code: None
- Fare zone: 3

History
- Opened: June 1854
- Closed: 1929

Former services
Preceding station	Long Island Rail Road	Following station
Woodside toward Long Island City or Penn Station	Main Line	Grand Street toward Greenport
Terminus	North Side Division	Elmhurst toward Port Washington
Preceding station	Flushing Railroad	Following station
Maspeth Closed 1858 toward Hunter's Point	New York and Flushing Railroad	through to Great Neck via NY&F Main Line
Location

Winfield Junction is a junction between the Main Line and Port Washington Branch of the Long Island Rail Road in the Woodside section of Queens in New York City. Between 1854 and 1929, the Winfield Junction station stood on this site.

== History ==
Winfield Junction station was originally opened in July 1854 by the New York and Flushing Railroad on the southeast corner of 50th Avenue and 69th Street. The junction's location was set the same year, when the NY&F's Main Line (now the Port Washington Branch) was built, crossing the LIRR's Main Line. By 1868 NY&F was consolidated by the Flushing and North Side Railroad, and the section west of Winfield was sold to the South Side Railroad of Long Island in 1869. This segment was abandoned in 1875. After further acquisition by the Flushing, North Shore, and Central Railroad in 1874, and then the Long Island Rail Road in 1876, the station was later moved to the junction in August 1876 where it also served the Main Line. A second station was built at some point, which was razed in 1915, and replaced with a third station the same year. Plans to close the station can be traced as far back as 1910, but the station was closed and then razed in 1929, making Woodside Station the transfer point between Main Line and Port Washington Branch trains.

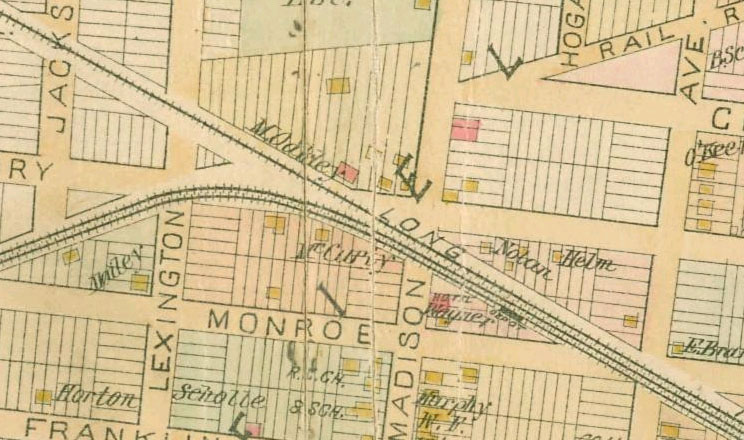
Winfield station map, 1891. South is at the top. Railroad Avenue was the old New York and Flushing Railroad line.
