= Port Washington station =

Long Island Rail Road station in Nassau County, New York

Port Washington
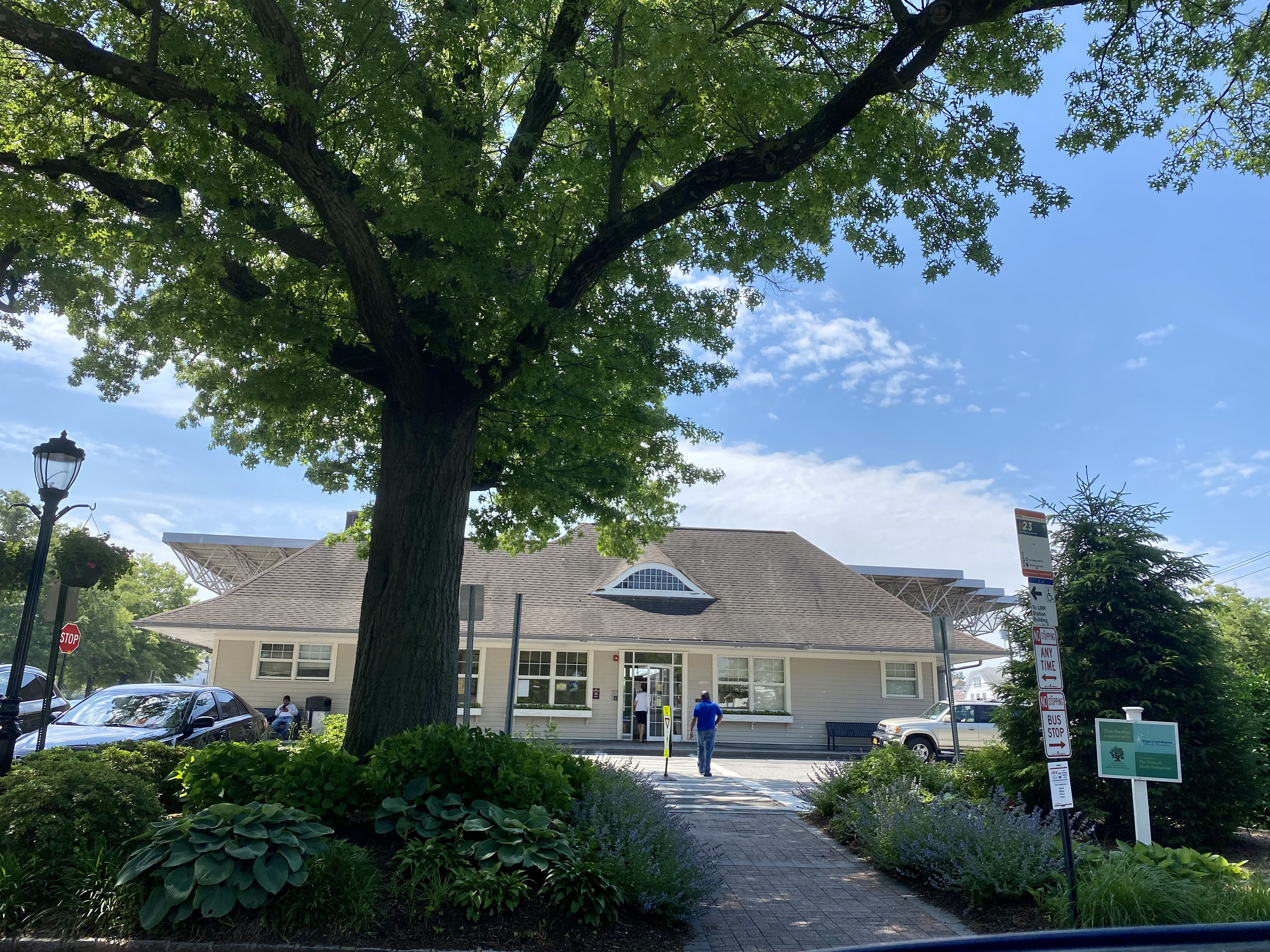
- The station house at Port Washington, seen from Main Street in 2021

General information
- Location: Main Street, between Haven & South Bayles Avenues; Port Washington, New York
- Coordinates: 40.82935°N 73.68733°W
- Line: Port Washington Branch
- Distance: 18.1 mi (29.1 km) from Long Island City
- Platforms: 2 island platforms
- Tracks: 8
- Connections: Nassau Inter-County Express: n23, Port Washington Shuttle

Construction
- Parking: Yes (Port Washington Parking District permits required)
- Cycle facilities: Yes
- Accessible: Yes

Other information
- Station code: PWS
- Fare zone: 4

History
- Opened: June 23, 1898
- Rebuilt: 1930, 1998
- Electrified: October 21, 1913; 750 V DC third rail

Passengers
- 2012—2014: 7,459 per weekday
- Rank: 13 of 125

Services
Preceding station	Long Island Rail Road	Following station
Plandome toward Penn Station or Grand Central	Port Washington Branch	Terminus
Location

Port Washington is the eastern terminal station of the Long Island Rail Road's Port Washington Branch, in Port Washington, New York, United States.

The station is located on Main Street, between Haven Avenue and South Bayles Avenue – just west of Port Washington Boulevard (NY 101), and is 19.9 miles (32 km) from Pennsylvania Station in Midtown Manhattan. A pedestrian overpass links the platforms, the parking lots on both sides of the station, and Haven Avenue at its intersection with Franklin Avenue.

== History ==
=== Early years ===
The construction of a train station in Port Washington was first recommended to Austin Corbin by a group of Port Washington residents in 1895, after a failed attempt to extend the existing North Side Division between Great Neck and Roslyn in 1882. Efforts to bring rail service to the community actually date back to the days of the Flushing and North Side Railroad which established an unbuilt subsidiary called the "North Shore and Port Washington Railroad" that was dissolved once the F&NS was consolidated into the Flushing, North Shore and Central Railroad in 1874.

The station was originally built on June 23, 1898, by the Great Neck and Port Washington Railroad, an LIRR subsidiary that existed between 1898 and 1902.

=== 20th century ===
Beginning in 1908, trolleys operated by the New York & North Shore Traction Company served the station along Main Street, running between the community's Manhasset Bay waterfront and Mineola by way of Roslyn. These trolleys ran until 1920, when the NY&NS declared bankruptcy and all its trolleys – including the Port Washington Line – ceased to operate. As of 2026, the n23 bus follows much this former trolley line's route.

In 1913, the remainder of the Port Washington Branch – all those portions of the line from Whitestone Junction (near the present-day site of the Mets–Willets Point station, at the line's split from the former Whitestone Branch) east to Port Washington– was electrified.

The station was remodeled in 1930, and again in 1998, upon its 100th Anniversary.

On August 3, 1946, a head-on train crash at the station resulted in two deaths and 27 injuries.

On October 14, 1947, the rear car of a New York-bound train backing into the station crashed into the bumper block at approximately 8:12 AM. The train subsequently derailed and crashed into the rear of the station building, ultimately coming to a stop inside the station's waiting room. One person – a 46-year-old passenger named Elizabeth Sandblom, who had been waiting on the platform – received non-fatal injuries.

In 1959, the main parking lot at the station was opened by the Port Washington Parking District, with a capacity of 411 cars. Parking capacity for the station more than doubled when the district opened the parking lot. The construction of this parking lot required the Town of North Hempstead and the Long Island Rail Road to make land swaps, and the station's rail freight depot was relocated south by roughly 0.5 miles (0.80 km) to make room for the improved parking facilities.

The station received high-level platforms in the mid-20th century, to accommodate the LIRR's then-new M1 railcars.

On December 29, 1988, a ten-car M3 train arriving from Penn Station derailed after crashing into the bumper block at the end of Track 3 at approximately 1:30 PM. The force of the impact caused the train to push the bumper block back by approximately one foot (30 cm); this resulted in the train and bumper block crashing into – and damaging – sections of the track, concrete platform, and the platform's steel railing. At the time of the incident, the train was carrying a total of 25 passengers and four crew members – none of whom were injured. Car # 9892 – the lead car – sustained minor damage in the incident.

=== 21st century ===
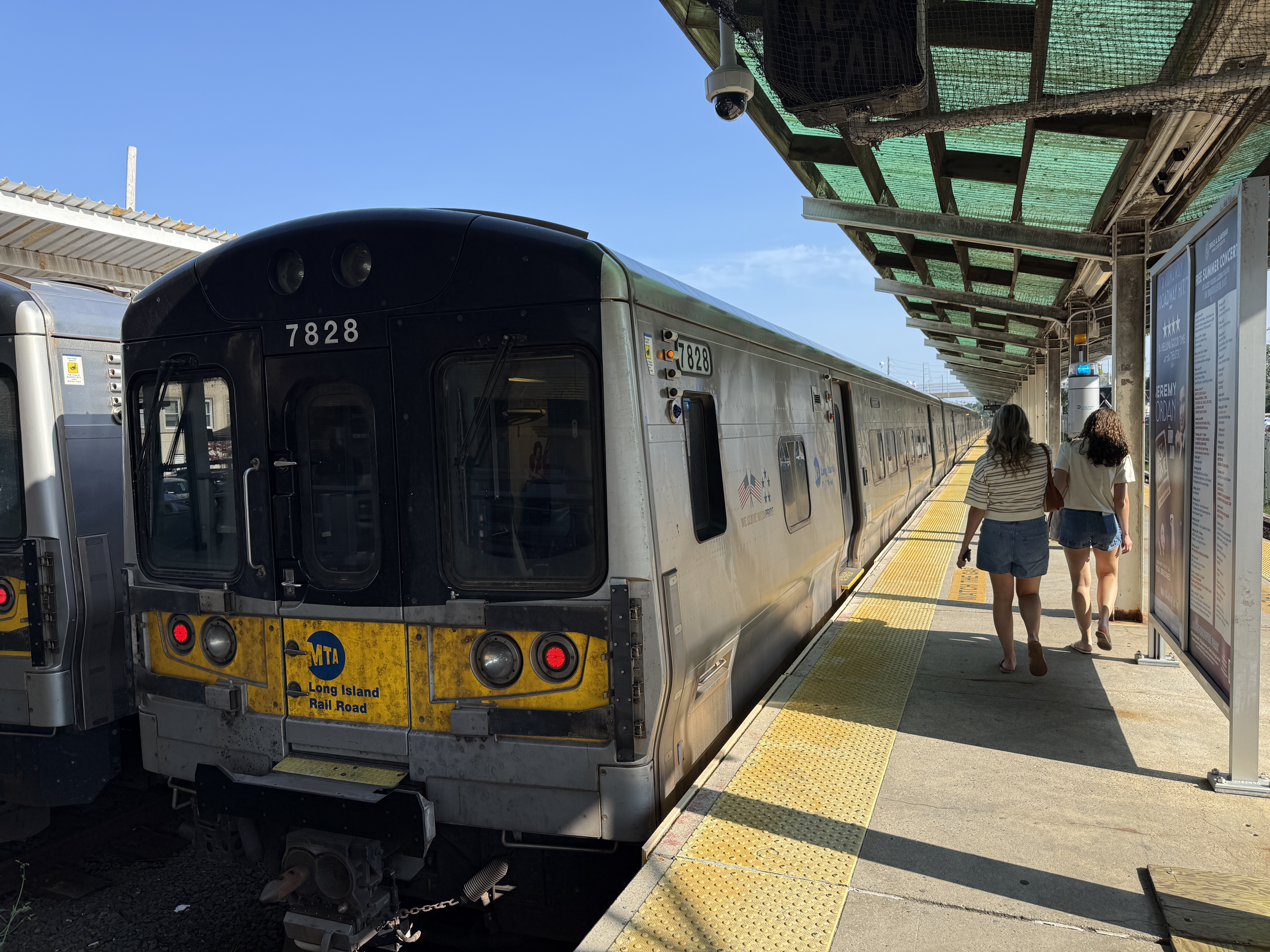
LIRR train at Port Washington station

In April 2014, a pedestrian bridge connecting the south end of the station with Haven Avenue closed, after pieces of concrete fell off the bridge and onto the tracks. Determined by engineers to be structurally unsound, corroded, and largely damaged beyond repair, the overpass was demolished, and the station's other pedestrian overpass received a temporary, prefabricated extension span to maintain the pedestrian connection between Haven Avenue and the south end of the station.

In 2018, then-New York State Senator Elaine R. Philips (R–Flower Hill) secured a $5 million grant to replace the platform canopies at the station.

In order to allow for increased service via the line to Grand Central Terminal, two existing tracks in the Port Washington Yard (located at the station) are planned to be extended. Work was originally scheduled to begin in January 2018 and be completed by December 2020. As of 2017, construction was scheduled to commence between late 2020 and early 2021, with a cost of $500,000. However, the project has been met with significant community opposition, primarily because of the proposed reduction in the number of parking spaces at the station. Additionally, a significant concern is the lack of any guarantee of increased service to the station upon completion of this costly project.

In July 2024, the MTA received permission from the North Hempstead town government to examine the feasibility of lengthening the outermost storage tracks.

As part of the 2025–2029 MTA Capital Program, the Port Washington station will undergo a station-wide renewal project. Work on accessibility, platform, structural, and mechanical improvements began in September 2026.

== Station layout ==
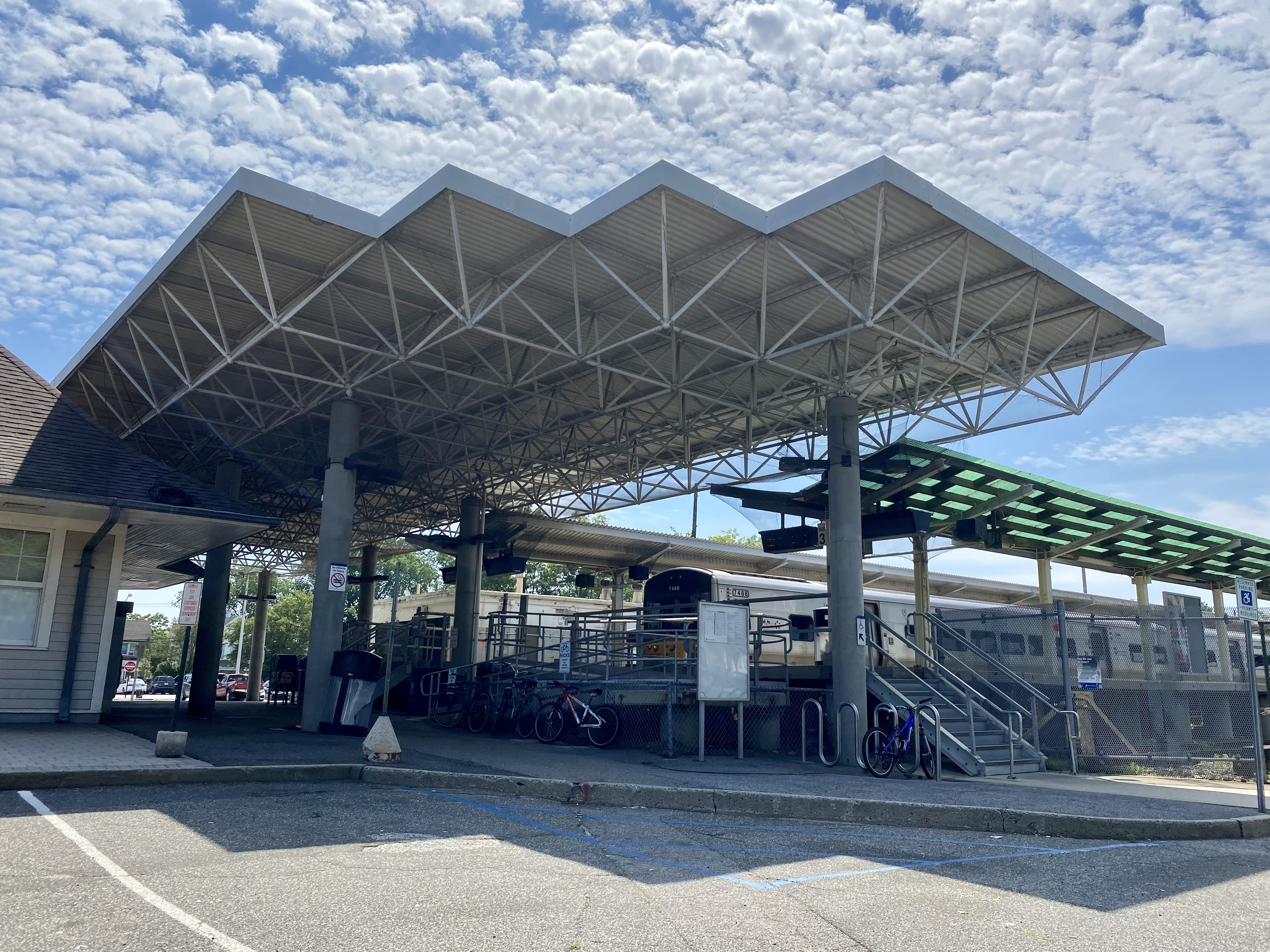
A train on Track 3, seen from the north end of the station

This station has two island platforms – each ten cars in length – serving four tracks. The remaining four tracks collectively form the Port Washington Yard, and are used for train storage.

== Port Washington Yard ==
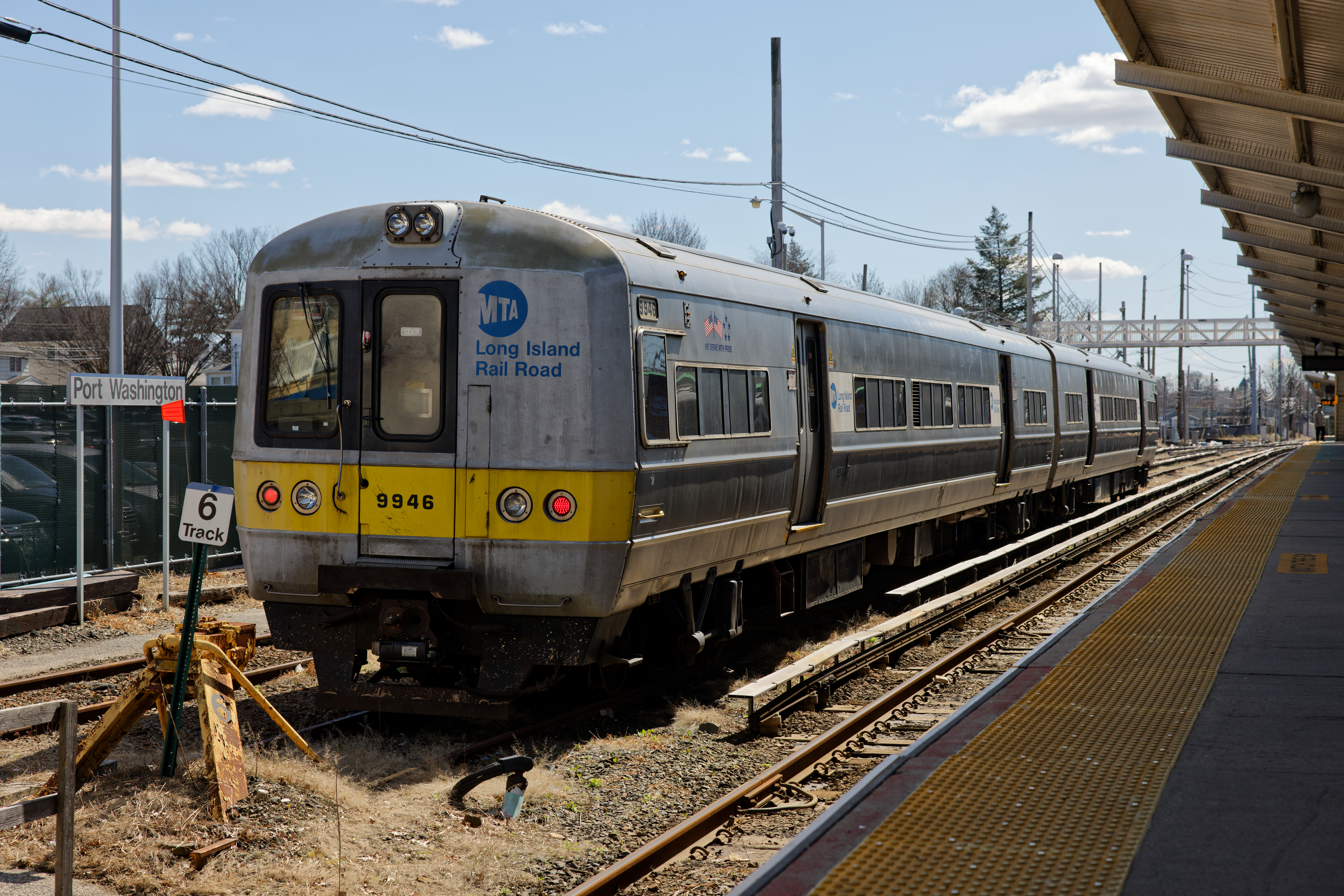
A pair of M3s in the Port Washington Yard in 2024

The Port Washington Yard is a rail yard in Port Washington, New York, located at the Port Washington Long Island Rail Road station – the terminus of the Port Washington Branch.

The yard consists of four tracks – three on the east side of the station and one on the west side. It can accommodate up to 40 train cars at a time.

=== Proposed expansion ===
In order to allow for increased service on the Port Washington Branch, two existing tracks in the Port Washington Yard are planned to be extended. Work was originally scheduled to begin in January 2018 and be completed by December 2020. As of 2017, construction was scheduled to commence between late 2020 and early 2021, with a cost of $500,000. However, the project has been met with significant community opposition – in large part due to the proposed reduction in the number of parking spaces at the station.

In September 2022, the MTA and the Town of North Hempstead agreed that the yard expansion is necessary and thus must be built. On July 9, 2024, the sides agreed to a memorandum of understanding (MOU), under which the LIRR would study expanding the yard. At the North Hempstead Town Council meeting that day (at which the memorandum was unanimously approved), North Hempstead Councilwoman Mariann Dalimonte stated – in response to a question from a member of the public – that she and Town Supervisor Jennifer DeSena had expressed the concern as to whether or not there would be any service improvements from this project to the Metropolitan Transportation Authority. Dalimonte said they asked the MTA to ensure that services would be expanded if the project is completed, but the MTA said they could not guarantee it.

As of September 2024, the Long Island Rail Road was in the process of acquiring the land needed to expand the yard.

== See also ==
- List of Long Island Rail Road stations
- Port Washington Parking District
