= Stonytown Road =

County road in Long Island, New York

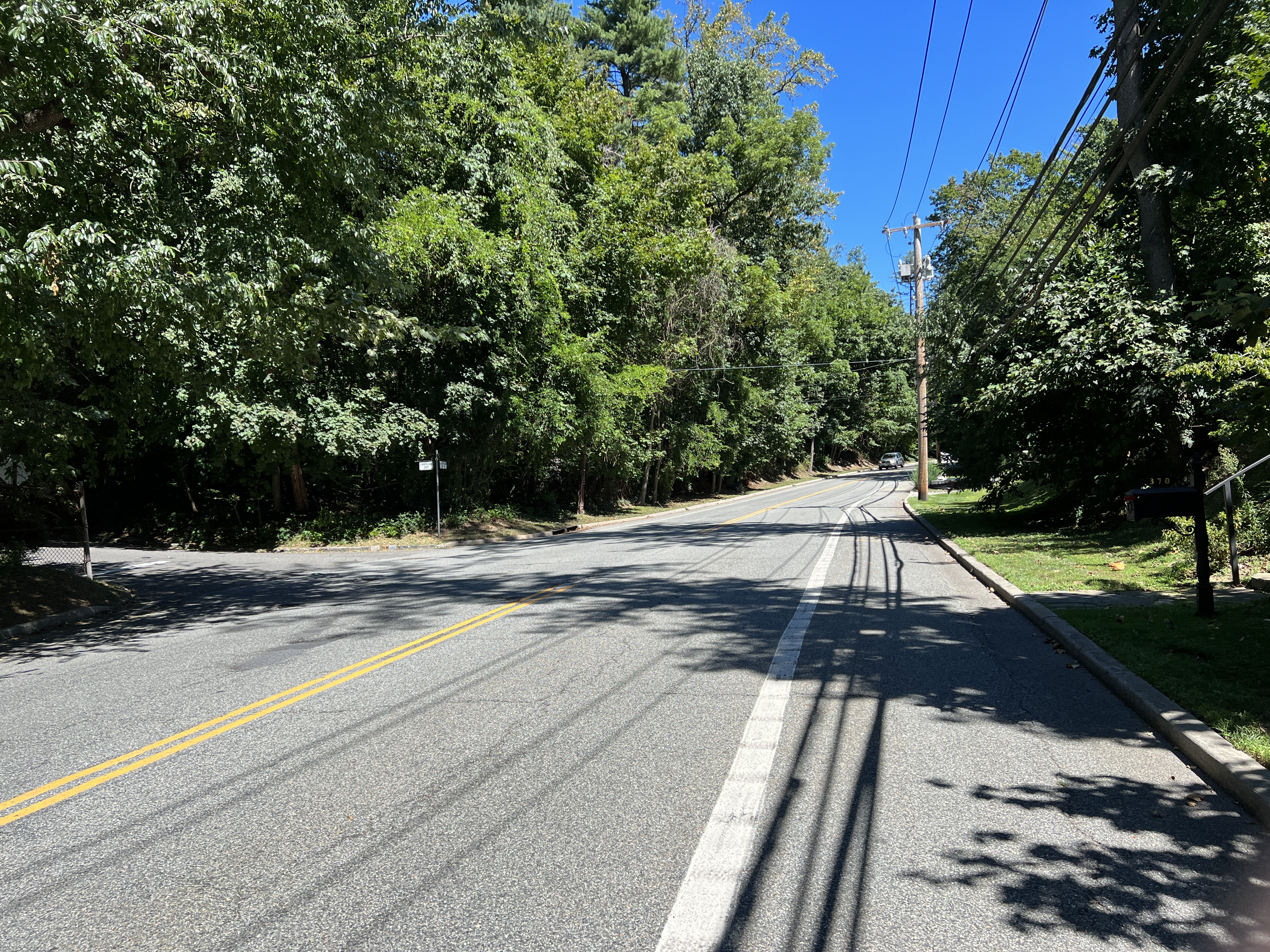
- Stonytown Road in Flower Hill in 2022.
- Type: Major Collector
- Maintained by: Village of Flower Hill, Village of Plandome, Village of Plandome Manor
- Length: 1.32 mi (2.12 km)
- East end: Port Washington Boulevard (NY 101) in Flower Hill
- West end: Plandome Road and North Plandome Road in Plandome Manor

Stonytown Road is a 1.32-mile (2.12 km) road in the incorporated villages of Flower Hill, Plandome, and Plandome Manor in the Town of North Hempstead, in Nassau County, on the North Shore of Long Island, in New York, United States. It serves as a major east-west through street across the Cow Neck Peninsula, between Plandome Road and North Plandome Road to the west and Port Washington Boulevard (NY 101) to the east – as well as forming portions of municipal boundaries.

== Description ==
Stonytown Road runs east-west through the incorporated villages of Flower Hill, Plandome, and Plandome Manor. The road serves as a main west-east route through portions of all three villages, and is the main access road for the Plandome station on the Long Island Rail Road's Port Washington Branch, as well as the Plandome Post Office (located at the station).

The road is classified as a major collector roadway by the New York State Department of Transportation and is eligible for federal aid.

Additionally, the portion of Stonytown Road in Flower Hill was formerly maintained by the County of Nassau, through the Nassau County Department of Public Works. When this segment was a county-maintained road, it was designated as Nassau County Route 143, before being re-numbered as CR E43 and then ultimately being transferred back to the Village in the 2000s.

=== Route description ===
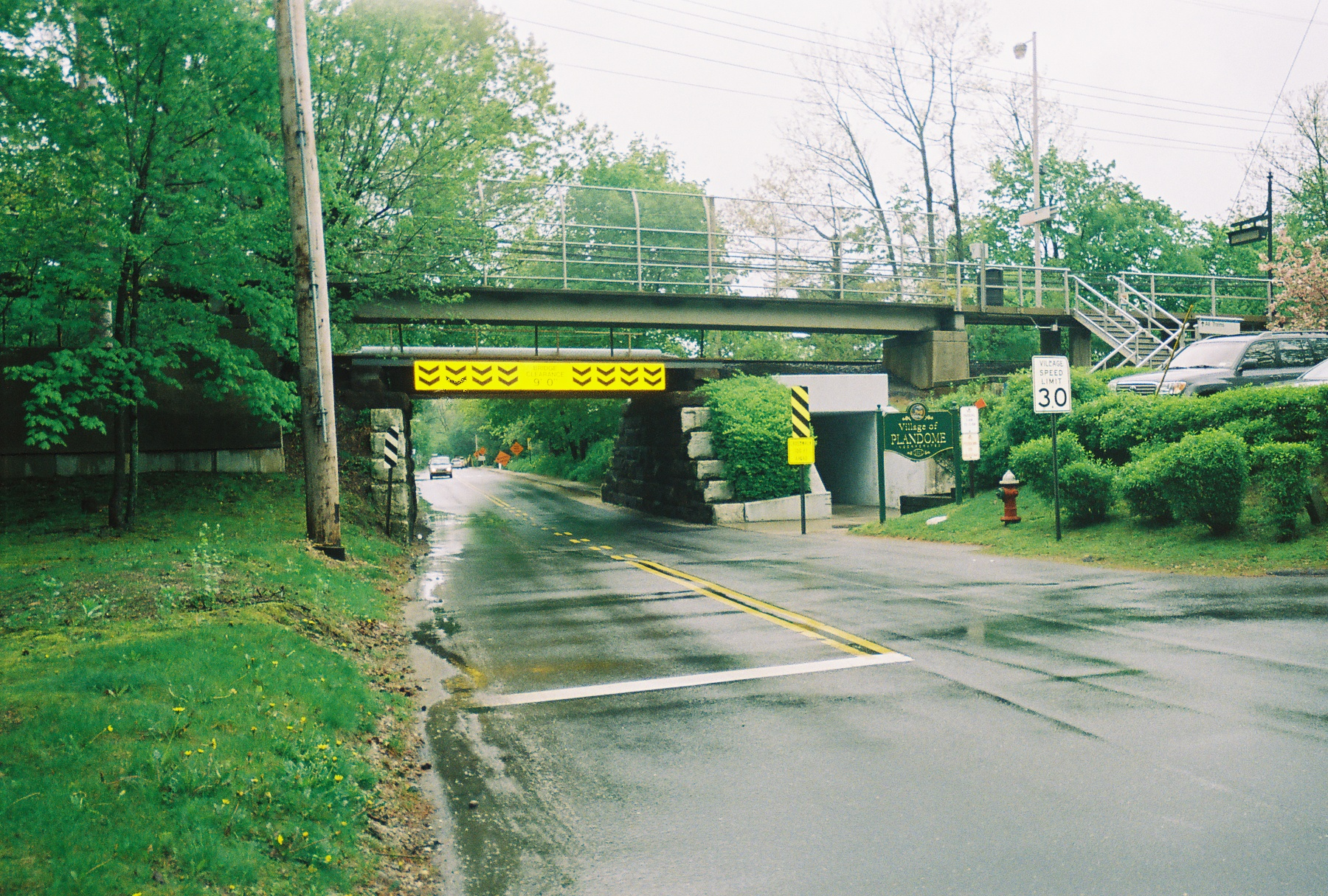
The LIRR overpass over Stonytown Road in Plandome

Stonytown Road's western terminus is at the intersection of Plandome Road and North Plandome Road in Plandome Manor. Continuing east, it passes Leeds Pond and enters Plandome, continuing towards the east, passing the Plandome Country Club. It then continues east, crossing underneath the Long Island Rail Road's Port Washington Branch and a portion of the platform at the Plandome LIRR station before re-entering Plandome Manor. The road continues through Plandome Manor until entering Flower Hill just west of Manhasset Woods Road. Stonytown Road then continues through Flower Hill to its eastern terminus, at Port Washington Boulevard (NY 101).

As of 2019, the portions of Stonytown Road within the Incorporated Village of Flower Hill are maintained by the Flower Hill Department of Public Works, the portions within the Incorporated Village of Plandome are maintained by the Plandome Department of Public Works, and the portions within the Incorporated Village of Plandome Manor are maintained by the Plandome Manor Department of Public Works.

=== Bicycle and pedestrian path ===
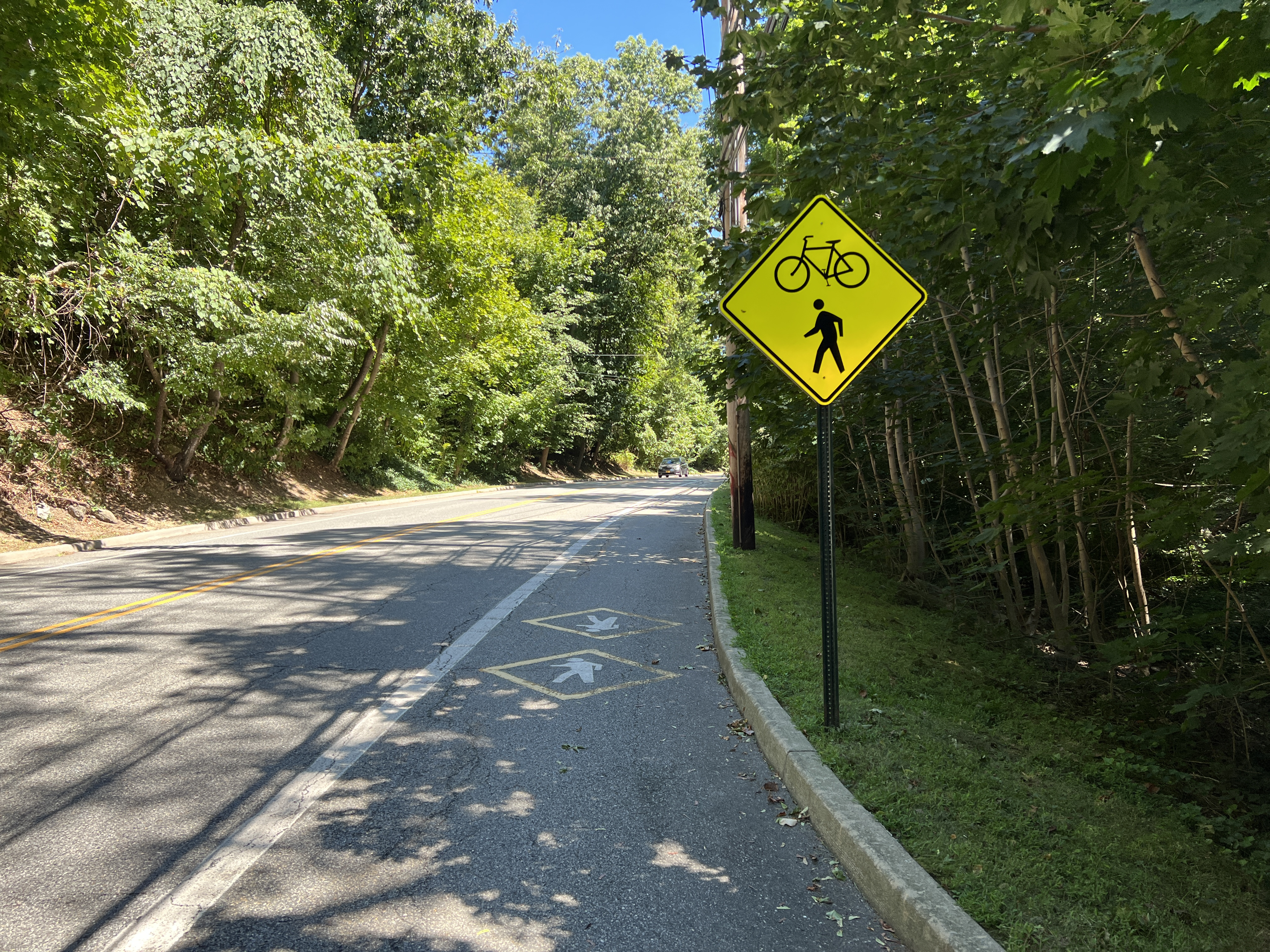
The dedicated bicycle and pedestrian lane along Stonytown Road in Flower Hill in 2022

The portion of Stonytown Road between the Plandome Long Island Rail Road station in Plandome Manor and its eastern terminus in Flower Hill features a dedicated bicycle and walking path. This dedicated bicycle and pedestrian pathway was constructed in the 2010s to improve safety for bicyclists and pedestrians along the road.

== Major intersections ==
Location	mi	km	Destinations	Notes
Plandome Manor	0.00	0.00	Plandome Road and North Plandome Road	Western terminus; roadway continues as Plandome Road and North Plandome Road.
Plandome–Plandome Manor line	0.14	0.23	North Drive	
Plandome	0.38	0.61	Rockwood Road and Plandome Station Plaza	Access to the Plandome LIRR station.
Flower Hill	0.74	1.19	Manhasset Woods Road	
Flower Hill	1.32	2.12	NY 101 (Port Washington Boulevard)	Eastern terminus.
1.000 mi = 1.609 km; 1.000 km = 0.621 mi

== Landmarks ==
The Plandome Long Island Rail Road station and post office are located off Stonytown Road in the Village of Plandome. The Flower Hill Village Park is located at the eastern terminus of the road, at its intersection with NY 101.

Additionally, Stonytown Road passes Leeds Pond in Plandome Manor.

== Notable residents ==
- Walter Slezak – Actor.
- Jesse Ricks – Executive and lawyer; his estate, Chanticlare, was located off Stonytown Road.

== See also ==
- Transportation on Long island
- Manhasset Woods Road
- Park Avenue (Manhasset, New York)
