= Plandome Road =

Road on Long Island, New York

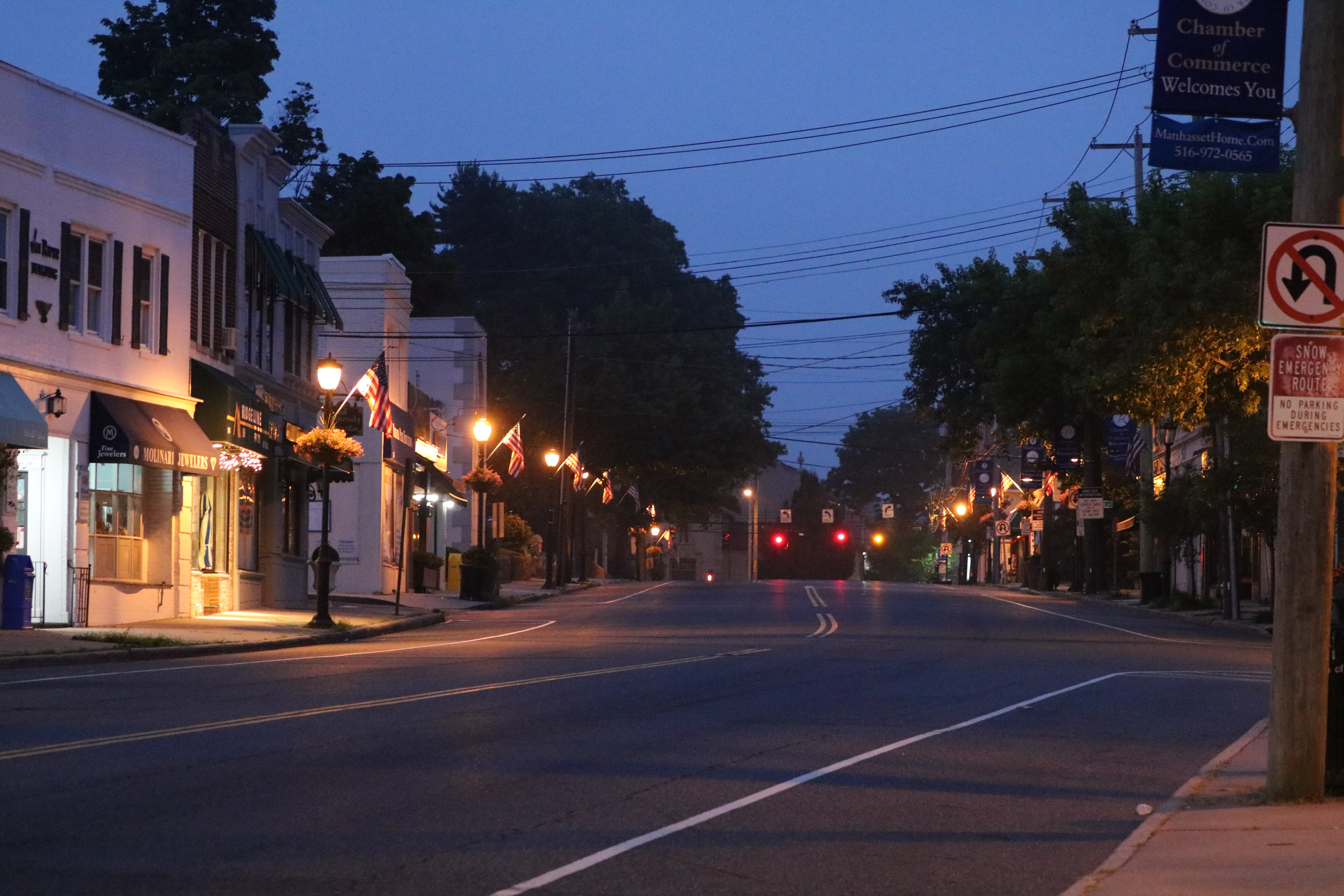
- Plandome Road in Manhasset in 2018
- Maintained by: Town of North Hempstead, Nassau County, Village of Plandome, Village of Plandome Manor
- South end: Northern Boulevard (NY 25A) in Manhasset
- North end: North Plandome Road and Stonytown Road in Plandome Manor

Map of Plandome Road

Plandome Road is a road in Manhasset and the incorporated villages of Plandome, Plandome Heights, and Plandome Manor within the Town of North Hempstead, in Nassau County, on the North Shore of Long Island, in New York, United States. It serves as a major north–south through street across the west side of the Cow Neck Peninsula, between Northern Boulevard (NY 25A) to the south and Stonytown Road and North Plandome Road to the north, and is the main thoroughfare in downtown Manhasset.

The portion of Plandome Road within the Incorporated Village of Plandome Heights is maintained by the Nassau County Department of Public Works as unsigned County Route D92.

At its north end, Plandome Road becomes North Plandome Road, which extends north to Main Street in Port Washington.

== Description ==
Plandome Road runs north–south through the incorporated villages of Plandome, Plandome Heights, and Plandome Manor, in addition to the heart of the unincorporated hamlet of Manhasset.

=== South of Webster Avenue ===
Plandome Road's southern terminus is at its intersection with Northern Boulevard (NY 25A). It then continues northwards, running through the middle of Manhasset's downtown, passing North Hempstead Town Hall and the Manhasset station on the Long Island Rail Road's Port Washington Branch; it intersects Park Avenue at the Manhasset Long Island Rail Road station, on the south side of the track. It then crosses over the Long Island Rail Road, continuing north to the Manhasset–Plandome Heights border at Webster Avenue, at which point it continues north as County Route D92; Town maintenance and ownership ends at this location, and County ownership and maintenance (along with the county route designation) begins.

This section of Plandome Road was previously owned and maintained by the county as County Route 170, prior to ownership and maintenance being transferred to the Town.

=== Nassau County Route D92 ===
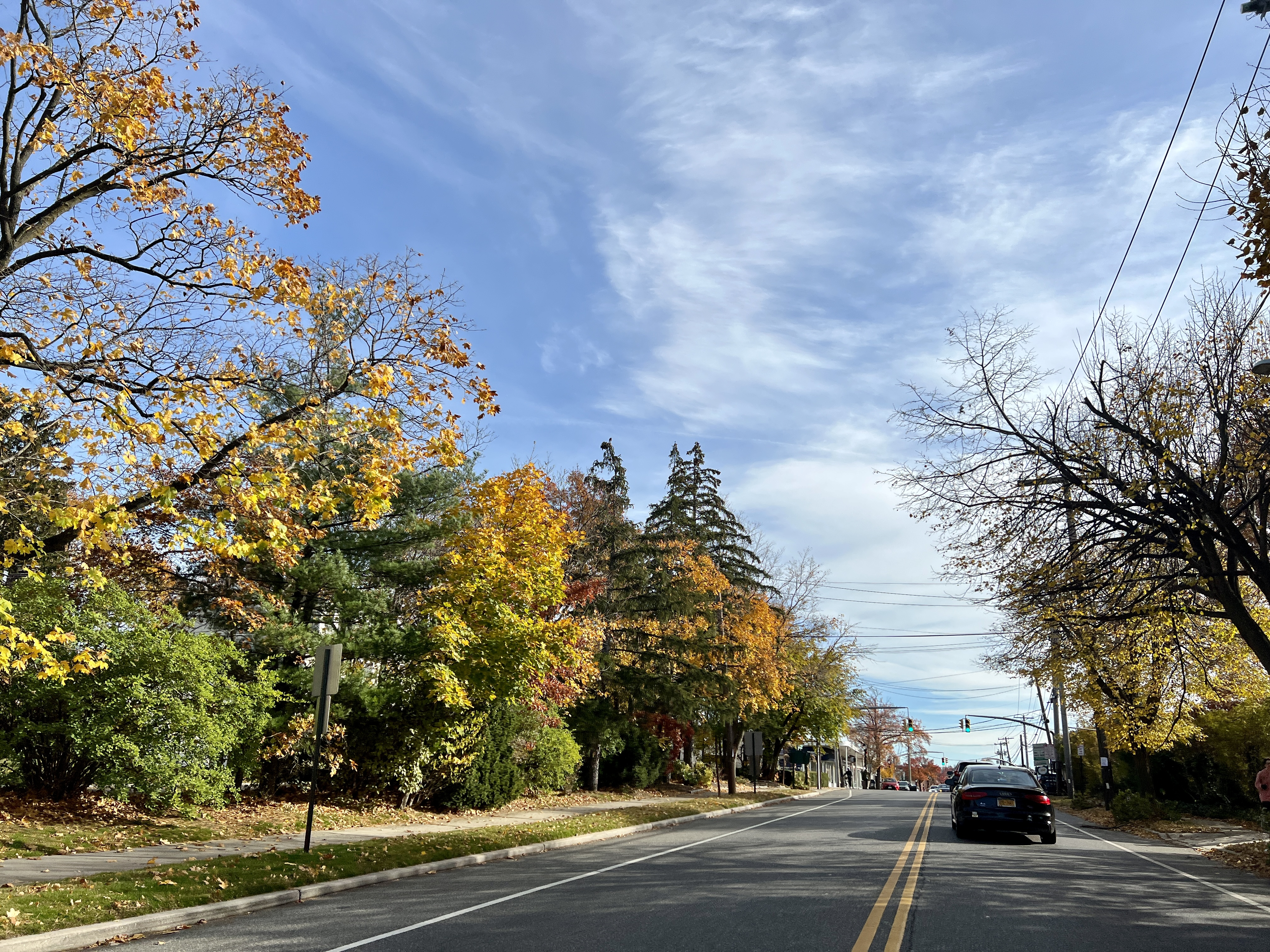
Plandome Road in Plandome Heights in 2021

Plandome Road then continues north from Webster Avenue at the Manhasset–Plandome Heights border as Nassau County Route D92 through Plandome Heights; this section is owned and maintained by the County of Nassau. This 0.38-mile (0.61 km) segment of Plandome Road continues north to the Plandome Heights–Plandome border at Terrace, at which point county ownership and the county route designation both end, with ownership and maintenance shifting at this point to the Village of Plandome Department of Public Works.

Like the southern section of the road through Manhasset, this portion of Plandome Road was formerly designated as County Route 170.

=== North of Terrace ===
The road continues from Terrace (at the Plandome Heights–Plandome border) through the Incorporated Village of Plandome, passing the Reconstructionist Synagogue of the North Shore and continuing north to the Plandome–Plandome Manor border. At this location, ownership and maintenance shifts to the Village of Plandome Manor Department of Public Works. Just north of this point, the road veers east, continuing eastwards through the Incorporated Village of Plandome Manor to its northern terminus at its intersection with North Plandome Road and Stonytown Road.

== North Plandome Road ==
North Plandome Road
- Maintained by: Town of North Hempstead, Village of Plandome Manor
- South end: Plandome and Stonytown Roads in Plandome Manor
- North end: Main Street in Port Washington

Map of North Plandome Road

North Plandome Road is a northern continuation of Plandome Road, traveling between Plandome Manor and Port Washington.

North Plandome Road begins at its intersection with Plandome Road and Stonytown Road in Plandome Manor. It then travels north-northwest and thence veering north-northeast for a short distance, hugging the shore of Leeds Pond until reaching Rock Hollow Road, which provides access to the Leeds Pond Preserve and the Science Museum of Long Island. It then briefly turns back towards the north-northwest and then turning northeast for a short distance, thence turning north and intersecting Elm Sea Lane before reaching Luquer Road.

Just north of Luquer Road, North Plandome Road exits Plandome Manor and enters Port Washington. It then continues north, soon intersecting Richards Road and thence continuing north to Yacht Club Drive. At Yacht Club Drive, North Plandome Road veers towards the northeast to Huntington Road, where it turns back towards the north. It soon thereafter intersects Murray Avenue and Pine Drive, and then continues north to Fifth Avenue, at which point North Plandome Road becomes Main Street, which continues north.

The portion of North Plandome Road in Plandome Manor is owned and maintained by the Incorporated Village of Plandome Manor, while the section in Port Washington is owned and maintained by the Town of North Hempstead.

== Major intersections ==
The entire route is in Nassau County.

Location	mi	km	Destinations	Notes
Manhasset	0.00	0.00	NY 25A (Northern Boulevard)	
Manhasset	0.21	0.34	Andrew Street and Manhasset Avenue	Access to the Manhasset LIRR station via Manhasset Avenue
Manhasset	0.29	0.47	Park Avenue	
Manhasset	0.37	0.60	Bayview Avenue	
Manhasset	0.52	0.84	Colonial Parkway	
Manhasset–Plandome Heights line	0.57 0.00	0.92 0.00	Webster Avenue	Southern terminus of CR D92
Plandome Heights–Plandome line	0.38 0.00	0.61 0.00	Terrace	Northern terminus of CR D92
Plandome	0.03	0.048	West Gate Boulevard	
Plandome	0.21	0.34	Shore and South Drives	
Plandome Manor	0.25	0.40	North Plandome and Stonytown Roads	Transitions from Plandome Road to North Plandome Road
Plandome Manor	0.54	0.87	Rock Hollow Road	Access to Leeds Pond Preserve and the Science Museum of Long Island
Plandome Manor	0.88	1.42	Luquer Road	
Plandome Manor–Port Washington line	0.9 0.00	1.4 0.00	Private roadway	Mileage resets
Port Washington	0.14	0.23	Richards Road	
Port Washington	0.19	0.31	Yacht Club Drive	
Port Washington	0.29	0.47	Huntington Road	
Port Washington	0.43	0.69	Murray Avenue and Pine Drive	
Port Washington	0.53	0.85	Fifth Avenue	Northern terminus of North Plandome Road; becomes Main Street at this location
1.000 mi = 1.609 km; 1.000 km = 0.621 mi: Route transition

== Landmarks ==
The Manhasset Long Island Rail Road station is located off Plandome Road in downtown Manhasset. Additionally, the road passes North Hempstead Town Hall, which is a Town of North Hempstead Designated Landmark and is listed on the New York State and National Registers of Historic Places.

Furthermore, Mary Jane Davies Green is located off Plandome Road, across the street from North Hempstead Town Hall, on the site of the Manhasset Union Free School District's former Plandome Road School.

== See also ==
- Main Street (Port Washington, New York)
- Park Avenue (Manhasset, New York)
