= North Hempstead Town Hall =

- U.S. National Register of Historic Places
- New York State Register of Historic Places
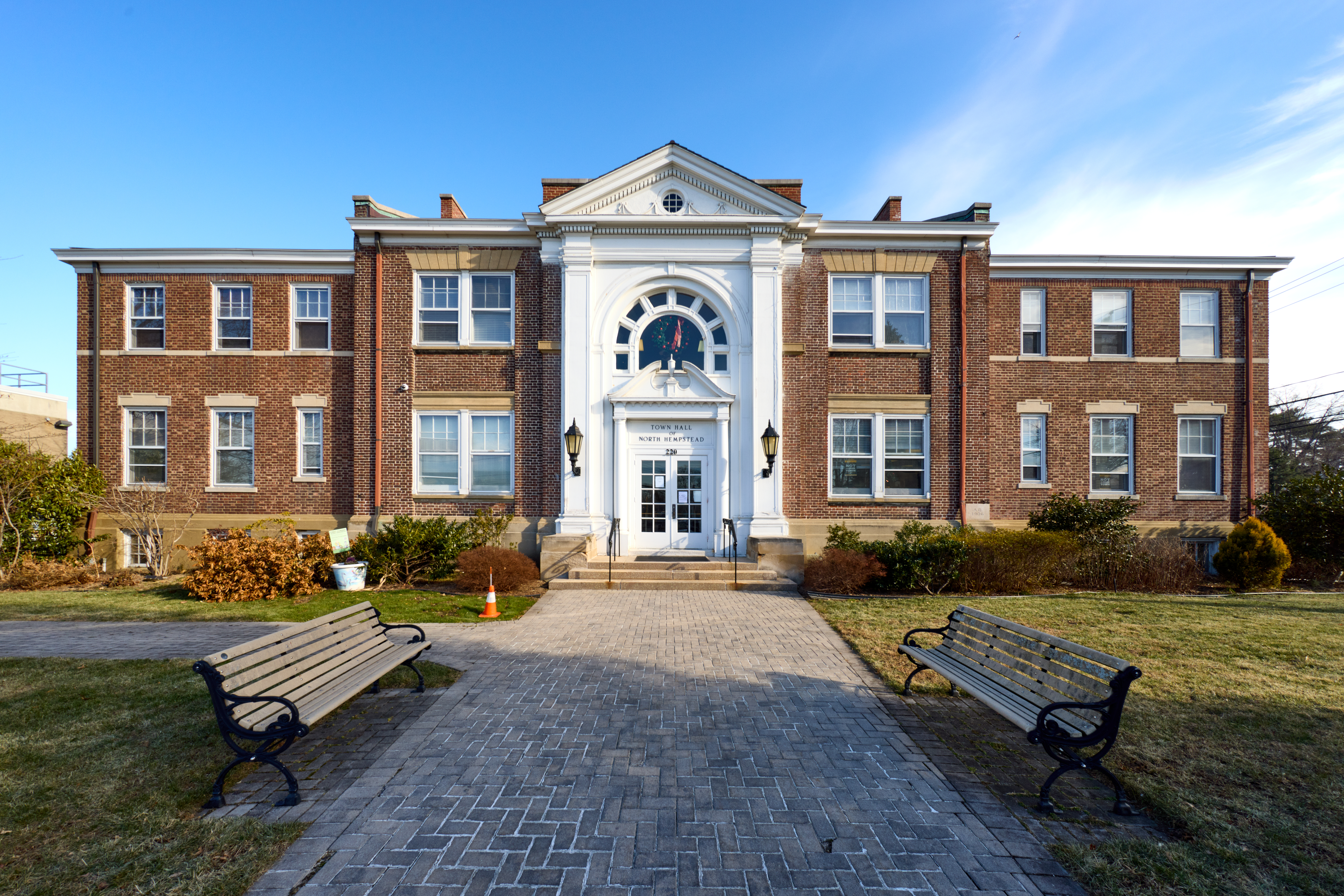
- North Hempstead Town Hall in 2022

- Location within New York Location within the United States
- Location: 220 Plandome Rd., Manhasset, New York
- Coordinates: 40°47′44.4″N 73°41′55.6″W
- Area: 1.1 acres (0.45 ha)
- Built: 1928
- Architect: Birdsall, Luther; et al.
- Architectural style: Colonial Revival
- NRHP reference No.: 06001143

Significant dates
- Added to NRHP: December 20, 2006
- Designated NYSRHP: October 17, 2006

North Hempstead Town Hall is a landmarked town hall building located on Plandome Road in Manhasset in Nassau County, on Long Island, in New York, United States.

== Description ==
The town hall is the main administrative building for the Town of North Hempstead. The original section was built in 1906–1907. Flanking additions were built in 1926-1928 and the large rear extension was completed in 1955. The original section is three bays wide and two and one half stories high, built of brick with cast stone accents. A copper domed, eight sided wooden cupola was added in 1928.

In 2006, the building was added to both the New York State Register of Historic Places and the National Register of Historic Places.

== See also ==
- National Register of Historic Places listings in North Hempstead, New York
- Main Street School
