= Almeron and Olive Smith House =

Historic home in Plandome, New York, US

- U.S. National Register of Historic Places
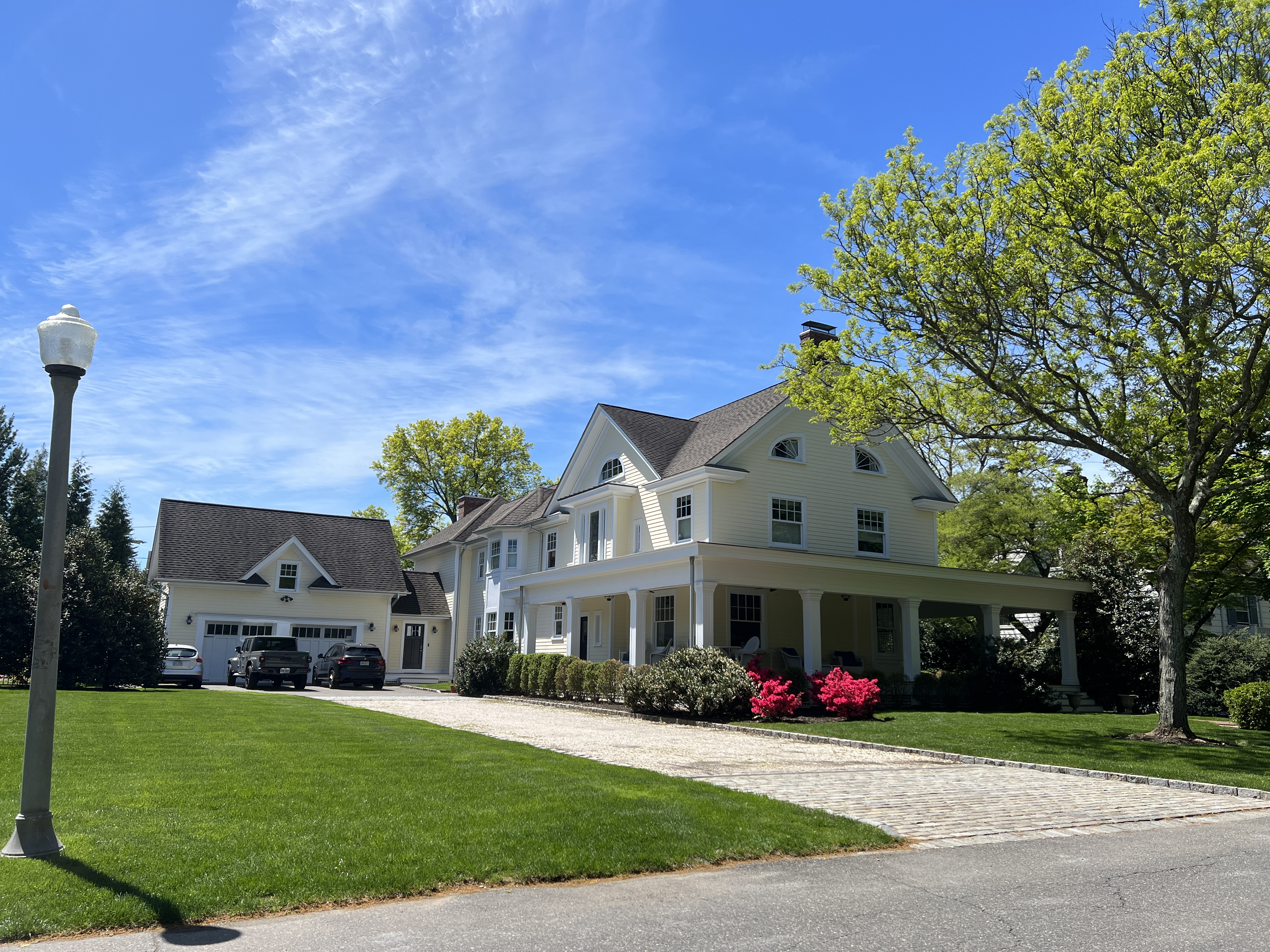
- The Almeron and Olive Smith House in 2023

- Location within Long Island Location within New York Location within the United States
- Location: 50 South Dr., Plandome, New York
- Coordinates: 40°48′23″N 73°42′11″W
- Area: less than one acre
- Built: 1907
- Architect: Plandome Land Company
- Architectural style: Colonial Revival
- NRHP reference No.: 06000569
- Added to NRHP: July 12, 2006

The Almeron and Olive Smith House is a historic home located in the Incorporated Village of Plandome in Nassau County, on Long Island, in New York, United States.

== Description ==
The Almeron and Olive Smith House was built in 1907 and is a 2 1/2-story building with a cross-gabled, overhanging roof. It features a one-story wraparound porch and has elements of Colonial Revival design. Also on the property is a contributing garage. It was one of the first residences built on lands developed by the Plandome Land Company.

The home was listed on the National Register of Historic Places in 2006.
