= Plandome, New York =

- Village
- Incorporated Village of Plandome
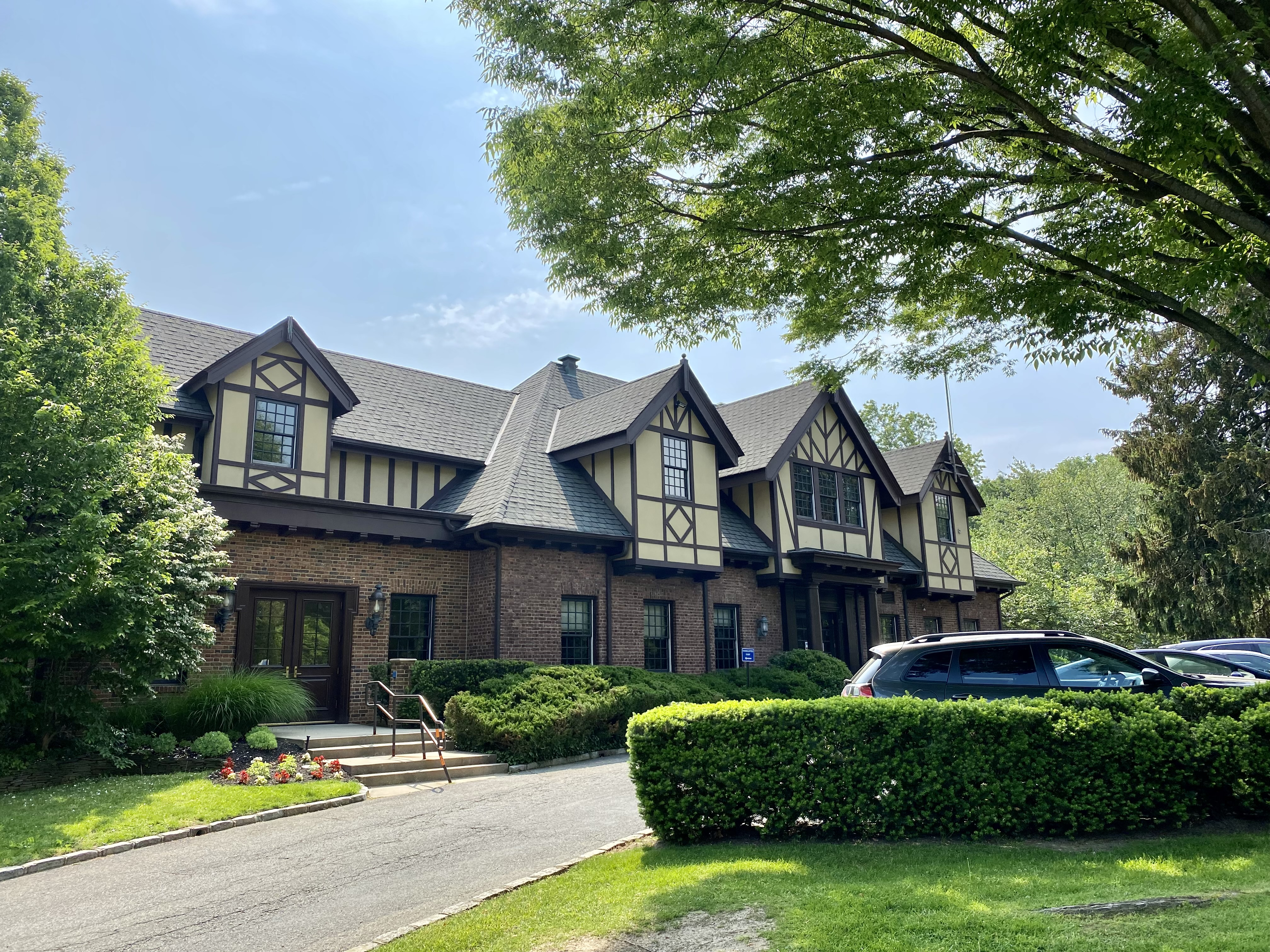
- Plandome Village Hall in 2021

- Location in Nassau County and the state of New York

- Location on Long Island Location within the state of New York
- Coordinates: 40°48′27″N 73°42′0″W
- Country: United States
- State: New York
- County: Nassau
- Town: North Hempstead
- Incorporated: 1911
- Named for: Latin phrase Planus Domus, meaning plain or level home

Government
  - Mayor: John "Jake" Kurkjian
  - Deputy Mayor: Don Richardson

Area
  - Total: 0.50 sq mi (1.30 km^{2})
  - Land: 0.49 sq mi (1.28 km^{2})
  - Water: 0.0077 sq mi (0.02 km^{2})
- Elevation: 72 ft (22 m)

Population (2020)
  - Total: 1,448
  - Density: 2,940.6/sq mi (1,135.36/km^{2})
- Time zone: UTC-5 (Eastern (EST))
  - Summer (DST): UTC-4 (EDT)
- ZIP code: 11030
- Area codes: 516, 363
- FIPS code: 36-58475
- GNIS feature ID: 0960668
- Website: www.villageofplandome.org

Plandome is a village in the Town of North Hempstead in Nassau County, on the North Shore of Long Island, in New York, United States. It is one of the three villages which comprise the area of Cow Neck known as the Plandomes – and it is also considered part of the Greater Manhasset area, which is anchored by Manhasset. The population was 1,448 at the time of the 2020 census.

The Incorporated Village of Plandome was ranked fifth on Forbes' 10 most affluent U.S. communities list in 2009.

== History ==
=== Pre-incorporation (pre-colonization – 1910) ===
The location of what is now the Village of Plandome was originally inhabited by Matinecock Native Americans. These Native American inhabitants called the area Sint Sink, meaning "place of small stones."

During the 17th century, Dutch and English colonists began to settle the area, with fishing in Manhasset Bay and farming serving as a major industries. In 1623, Cow Neck was claimed by the Dutch West India Company, and they began forcing English settlers to leave in 1640. A land purchase in 1643 made it possible for English settlers to return to Cow Neck. This era saw members of prominent colonial families settle on the peninsula, including members of the Mitchill, Nicolls, and Willets families. The Mitchill family, which settled in the area in 1694, owned a significant portion of the land which would eventually become the village – as did the George Willets, of the Willets family, which has long had a large presence on Cow Neck and across Long Island.

The Great Neck and Port Washington Railroad, a subsidiary of the Long Island Rail Road, built what is today known as the Port Washington Branch through the community in 1898; Plandome became a flag stop until the opening of the permanent Plandome station in 1909. This new station would also house the community's U.S. Post Office, which would service all portions of what are now the Village of Plandome and Village of Plandome Manor, in addition to a portion of what is now the Village of Flower Hill.

During the first few years of the 20th century, four friends, all young men residing in New York City, purchased approximately 90 acres (36 ha) of the property owned by the Mitchill family. They founded the Plandome Land Company, through which they subsequently developed vast swaths of the land with single-family homes, centered around Plandome Village Green and a large Tudor building which would eventually become Plandome Village Hall.

=== Village of Plandome (1911 – present) ===
The Village of Plandome was incorporated in 1911 as the Plandome Land Company began to develop land, though some homes, farmhouses, and mills had been built in the area in prior decades.

In 1913, the village established the Plandome Fire Department, a municipal fire department exclusively serving the village.

In the 1930s, Plandome's municipal water supply system was established, as part of a New Deal-funded public works project. Construction started in 1934 and was completed in 1935.

In 1943, the Plandome Post Office, which had operated as an independent branch up until that point, merged with the Manhasset Post Office. As part of the merger, the Plandome Post Office would continue to operate but it would be reclassified as a branch of the Manhasset Post Office, thereby allowing the facility to remain in operation while enabling the residents of Plandome to receive home delivery services from the post office.

In January 1987, the original Plandome LIRR station house and the Plandome Post Office within it burned down in an arson attack executed by vandals. It was rebuilt, in addition to having its platform lengthened and refurbished, by 1990. The Plandome Post Office was also rebuilt within the structure, this time in its own, dedicated space on the ground floor, beneath the station's waiting room.

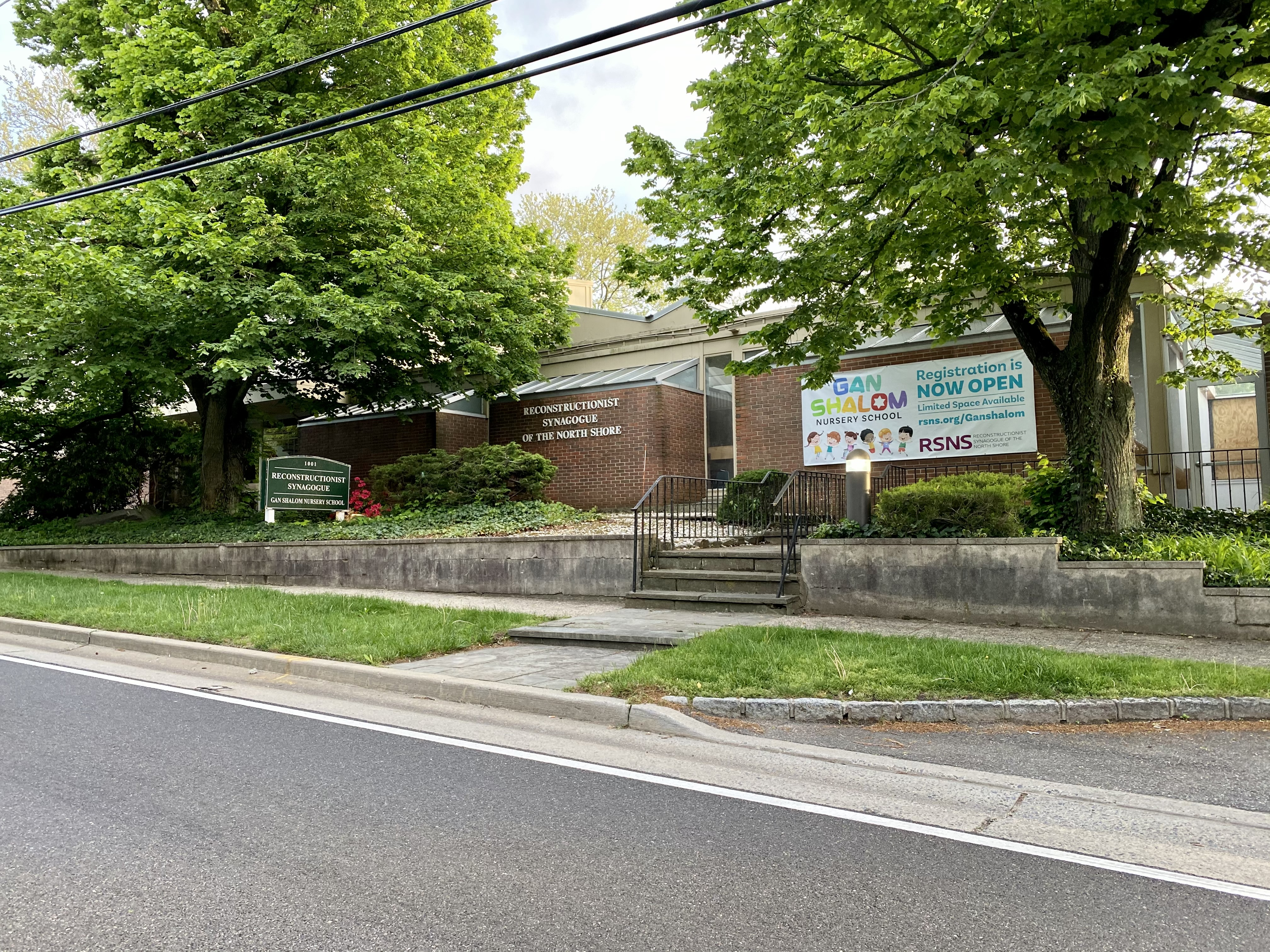
The Reconstructionist Synagogue of the North Shore in 2021

In the early 1990s, the Reconstructionist Synagogue of the North Shore moved to Plandome from nearby Roslyn Estates; it moved to a property formerly owned and utilized by the Unitarian Universalist Congregation of the North Shore – which itself was moving to a new location off Shelter Rock Road in Manhasset – as a church.

The Village of Plandome celebrated its centennial in 2011.

In 2019, former Village Trustee Thomas S. Minutillo was elected as Mayor of Plandome through a write-in campaign. He was succeeded by former village trustee John "Jake" Kurkjian in 2023.

In 2022, the village built a memorial garden to its victims of the September 11, 2001 terrorist attacks. This memorial garden includes large clock, and is located adjacent to Plandome Village Hall.

=== Etymology ===
The Village of Plandome – like the Village of Plandome Manor to its north and the Village of Plandome Heights to its south – derives its name from the Latin phrase, Planus Domus, meaning plain or level home.

== Geography ==
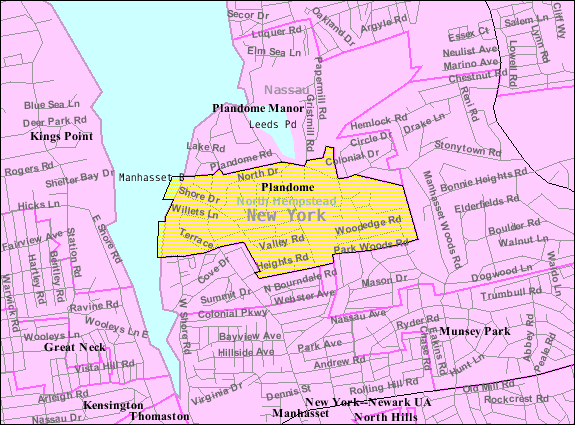
U.S. Census map of Plandome

According to the United States Census Bureau, the village has a total area of 0.5 square miles (1.3 km^{2}), of which 0.5 square miles (1.3 km^{2}) is land and 2.00% is water.

=== Topography ===
According to the United States Environmental Protection Agency and the United States Geological Survey, the highest point in Plandome is located on Parkwoods Road at the Plandome–Flower Hill border in the southeastern part of the village, at roughly 150 feet (46 m), and the lowest point is Manhasset Bay, which is located at sea level.

=== Drainage ===
Plandome is located entirely within the Manhasset Bay Watershed, with some portions of the village draining directly to the bay while other portions drain to the Leeds Pond sub-watershed of the Manhasset Bay Basin.

Furthermore, the village, in its entirety, is also located within the larger Long Island Sound/Atlantic Ocean Watershed.

=== Climate ===
The Village of Plandome features a humid subtropical climate (Cfa) under the Köppen climate classification and is located near the broad transitional zone between humid subtropical and humid continental (Dfa) climates. Accordingly, the village experiences hot, humid summers and cold winters, and experiences precipitation throughout the entirety of the year.

Climate data for Plandome, New York
Month	Jan	Feb	Mar	Apr	May	Jun	Jul	Aug	Sep	Oct	Nov	Dec	Year
Record high °F (°C)	71 (22)	73 (23)	87 (31)	94 (34)	96 (36)	101 (38)	108 (42)	105 (41)	97 (36)	89 (32)	83 (28)	76 (24)	108 (42)
Mean daily maximum °F (°C)	40.4 (4.7)	42.9 (6.1)	51.1 (10.6)	61.2 (16.2)	70.6 (21.4)	79.6 (26.4)	84.5 (29.2)	83.3 (28.5)	76.0 (24.4)	65.4 (18.6)	55.7 (13.2)	45.1 (7.3)	63.0 (17.2)
Daily mean °F (°C)	33.4 (0.8)	35.0 (1.7)	42.0 (5.6)	51.8 (11.0)	60.8 (16.0)	70.1 (21.2)	75.2 (24.0)	74.1 (23.4)	67.2 (19.6)	56.5 (13.6)	47.8 (8.8)	38.2 (3.4)	54.3 (12.4)
Mean daily minimum °F (°C)	26.4 (−3.1)	27.1 (−2.7)	33.5 (0.8)	42.4 (5.8)	51.0 (10.6)	60.6 (15.9)	65.8 (18.8)	65.0 (18.3)	58.3 (14.6)	47.6 (8.7)	39.9 (4.4)	31.2 (−0.4)	45.7 (7.6)
Record low °F (°C)	−4 (−20)	−5 (−21)	5 (−15)	13 (−11)	34 (1)	43 (6)	50 (10)	46 (8)	38 (3)	27 (−3)	18 (−8)	−2 (−19)	−5 (−21)
Average precipitation inches (mm)	3.56 (90)	2.87 (73)	4.47 (114)	3.85 (98)	3.23 (82)	3.54 (90)	3.97 (101)	4.26 (108)	4.31 (109)	4.08 (104)	3.18 (81)	3.99 (101)	45.31 (1,151)
Average snowfall inches (cm)	5.5 (14)	7.8 (20)	3.7 (9.4)	0.3 (0.76)	0 (0)	0 (0)	0 (0)	0 (0)	0 (0)	0 (0)	0.2 (0.51)	5.7 (14)	23.2 (58.67)
Average relative humidity (%)	73	75	72	72	75	74	73	71	73	73	71	75	73
Mean monthly sunshine hours	177	153	172	167	202	213	237	241	215	190	210	171	2,348
Average ultraviolet index	2	2	2	3	5	6	6	6	5	3	2	2	4
Source: NOAA; Weather Atlas; The Weather Channel

== Economy ==
Plandome is a bedroom community of the City of New York. Accordingly, a significant number of its residents commute to/from New York for work.

The village itself is predominantly residential in character, with the heavy majority of lots within the village being zoned for single-family homes; there is no multi-family housing. There are no lots zoned for business or commercial uses and, accordingly, there are no business districts anywhere within the village.

== Demographics ==
Historical population
Census	Pop.	Note	%±
1920	319		—
1930	769		141.1%
1940	897		16.6%
1950	1,102		22.9%
1960	1,379		25.1%
1970	1,593		15.5%
1980	1,503		−5.6%
1990	1,347		−10.4%
2000	1,272		−5.6%
2010	1,349		6.1%
2020	1,448		7.3%
U.S. Decennial Census

=== 2010 census ===
As of the 2010 United States census, there were 1,349 people residing in the village. The racial makeup of the village was 94.74% White, 0.82% African American, 0.07% Native American, 3.63% Asian, 0.22% from other races, and 0.52% from two or more races. Hispanic or Latino people of any race were 2.22% of the population.

=== Census 2000 ===
As of the census of 2000, there were 1,272 people, 409 households, and 361 families residing in the village. The population density was 2,584.9 inhabitants per square mile (998.0/km^{2}). There were 422 housing units at an average density of 857.6 per square mile (331.1/km^{2}). The racial makeup of the village was 95.75% White, 0.24% African American, 0.08% Native American, 3.14% Asian, 0.08% from other races, and 0.71% from two or more races. Hispanic or Latino people of any race were 2.12% of the population.

There were 409 households, out of which 42.8% had children under the age of 18 living with them, 82.4% were married couples living together, 3.7% had a female householder with no husband present, and 11.7% were non-families. 11.5% of all households were made up of individuals, and 9.0% had someone living alone who was 65 years of age or older. The average household size was 3.08 and the average family size was 3.34.

In the village, the population was spread out, with 30.7% under the age of 18, 5.9% from 18 to 24, 18.2% from 25 to 44, 29.7% from 45 to 64, and 15.4% who were 65 years of age or older. The median age was 42 years. For every 100 females, there were 96.3 males. For every 100 females age 18 and over, there were 90.7 males.

The median income for a household in the village was $192,073, and the median income for a family was $200,000. Males had a median income of $100,000 versus $52,500 for females. The per capita income for the village was $95,102. About 2.8% of families and 4.5% of the population were below the poverty line, including 3.9% of those under age 18 and 2.5% of those age 65 or over.

== Government ==
=== Village government ===
As of March 2026, the Mayor of Plandome is John "Jake" Kurkjian, the Deputy Mayor is Damien Quinn, and the Village Trustees are Dr. Robert Broderick, James Corcoran, Esq., Rich Dunphy, and Damien Quinn.

=== Representation in higher government ===
==== Town representation ====
Plandome is located in the Town of North Hempstead's 5th council district, which as of March 2026 is represented on the North Hempstead Town Council by Yaron Levy (R-Harbor Hills).

==== Nassau County representation ====
Plandome is located in Nassau County's 10th Legislative district, which as of March 2026 is represented in the Nassau County Legislature by Mazi Melesa Pilip (R-Great Neck).

==== New York State representation ====
===== New York State Assembly =====
Plandome is located within New York's 16th State Assembly district, which as of March 2026 is represented by Daniel J. Norber (R–Great Neck).

===== New York State Senate =====
Plandome is located in the New York State Senate's 7th State Senate district, which as of March 2026 is represented by Jack M. Martins (R–Old Westbury).

==== Federal representation ====
===== United States Congress =====
Plandome is located in New York's 3rd congressional district, which as of March 2026 is represented in the United States Congress by Thomas R. Suozzi (D–Glen Cove).

==== United States Senate ====
Like the rest of New York, Plandome is represented in the United States Senate by Charles E. Schumer (D) and Kirsten E. Gillibrand (D).

=== Politics ===
In the 2024 U.S. presidential election, the majority of Plandome voters voted for Donald J. Trump (R), who received over 60 percent of the vote within the village.

== Media ==
=== Newspapers ===
The Manhasset Press Times is the newspaper of record for the Village of Plandome. It is part of Schneps Media.

Other major newspapers serving Plandome include Newsday, New York Post, The New York Times, and The Wall Street Journal.

=== Television ===
Plandome is one of North Shore TV's fourteen member villages. North Shore TV provides Plandome and the other member villages with public-access television programming, through Optimum and Verizon Fios – the main cable television providers in the area.

== Parks & recreation ==
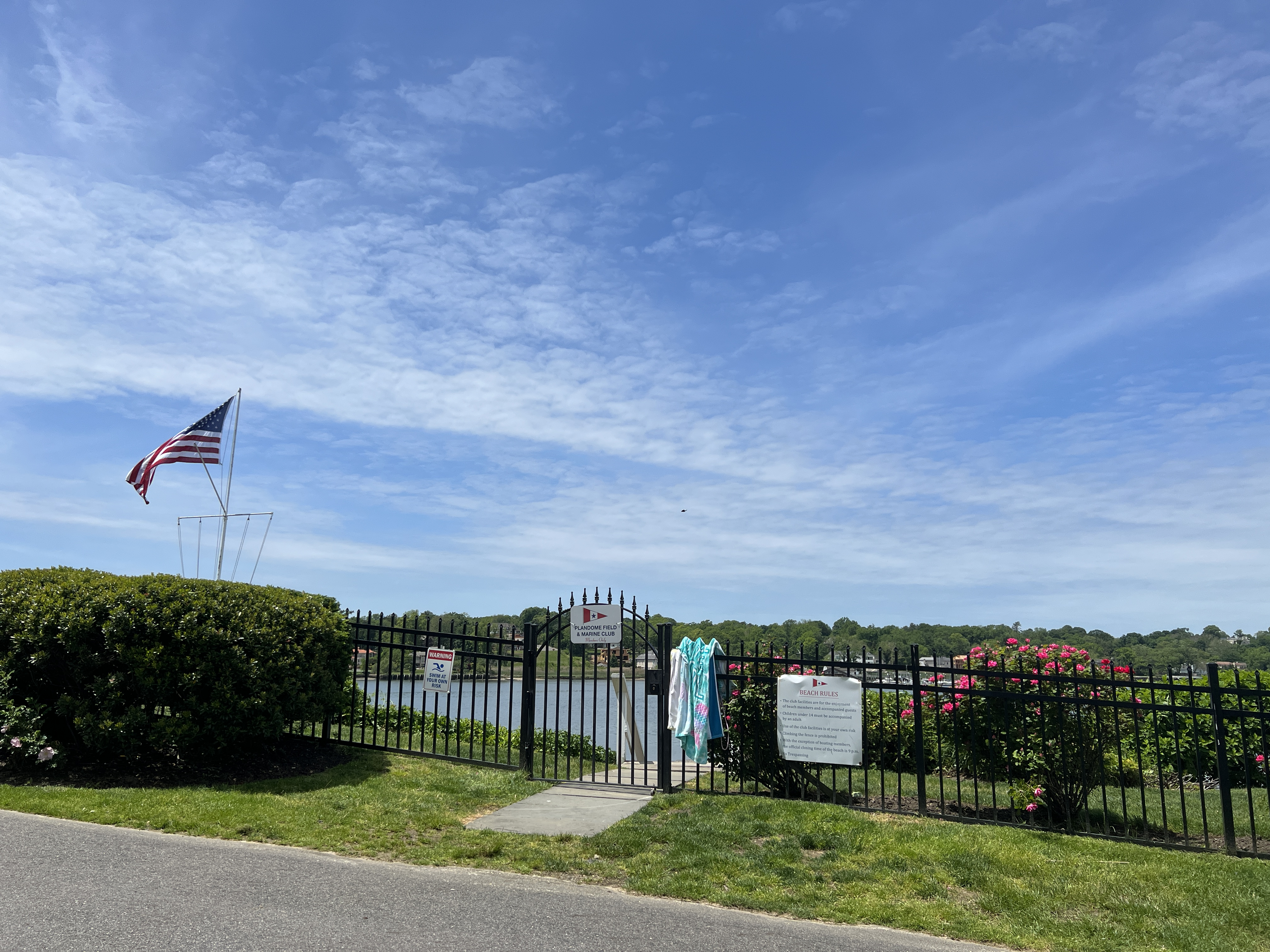
The Plandome Field and Marine Club in 2022

- Plandome Field and Marine Club – a waterfront park adjacent to Manhasset Bay.
- Plandome Village Green – a large green space in the heart of the village. It is also the location of Village Hall, which at one point was used as a school building.
- A portion of the private Plandome Country Club is located within the village's boundaries.

== Education ==
=== School district ===
The Village of Plandome is located entirely within the boundaries of the Manhasset Union Free School District. As such, all children who reside within Plandome and attend public schools go to Manhasset's schools.

=== Library district ===
Plandome is located entirely within the boundaries of the Manhasset Library District, which is served by the Manhasset Public Library in Manhasset.

== Infrastructure ==
=== Transportation ===
==== Road ====
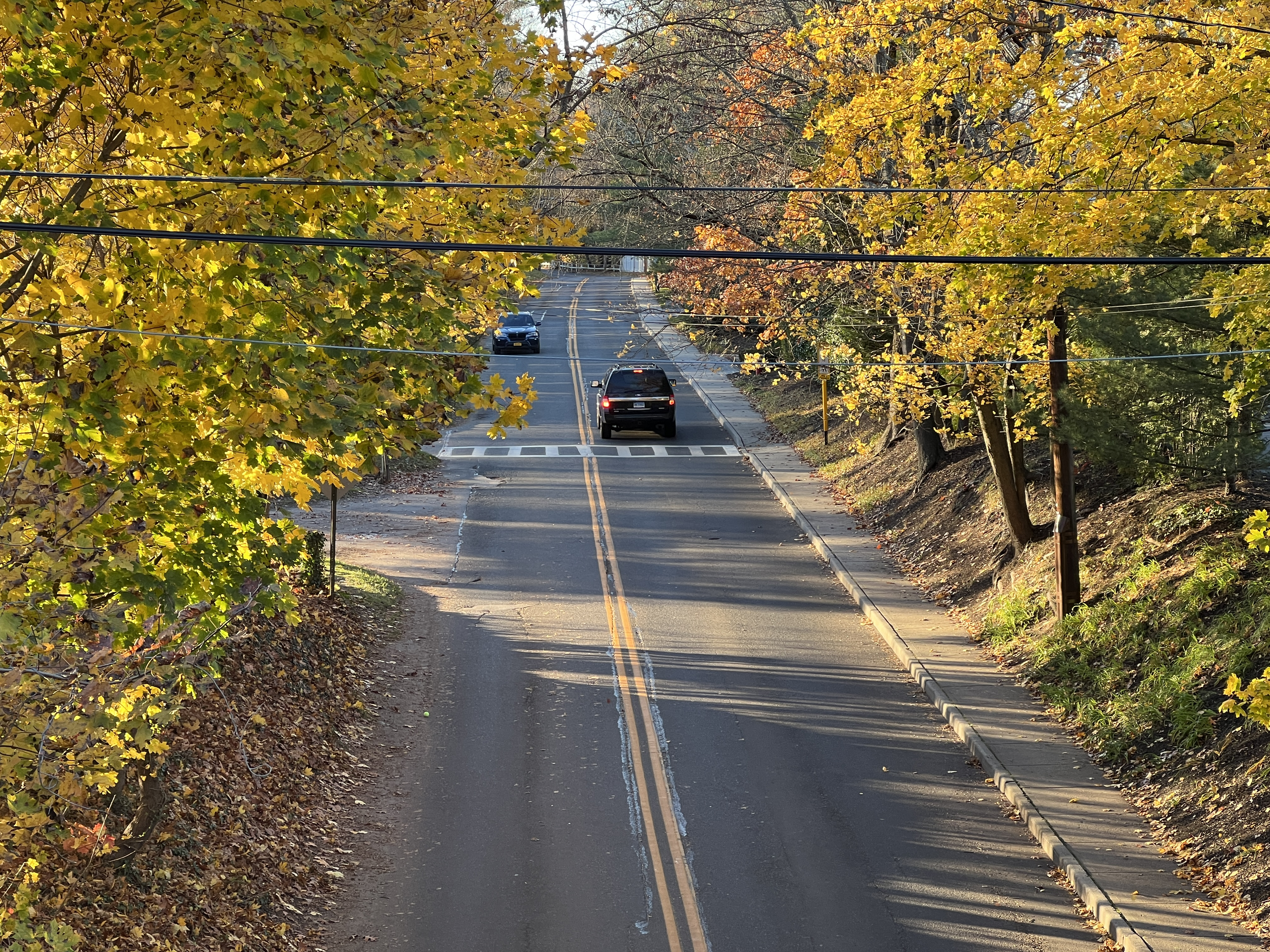
Stonytown Road in Plandome in 2023

Major roads in Plandome include Plandome Road and Stonytown Road. The portions of these two roads located within the village are owned and maintained by the village.

==== Rail ====
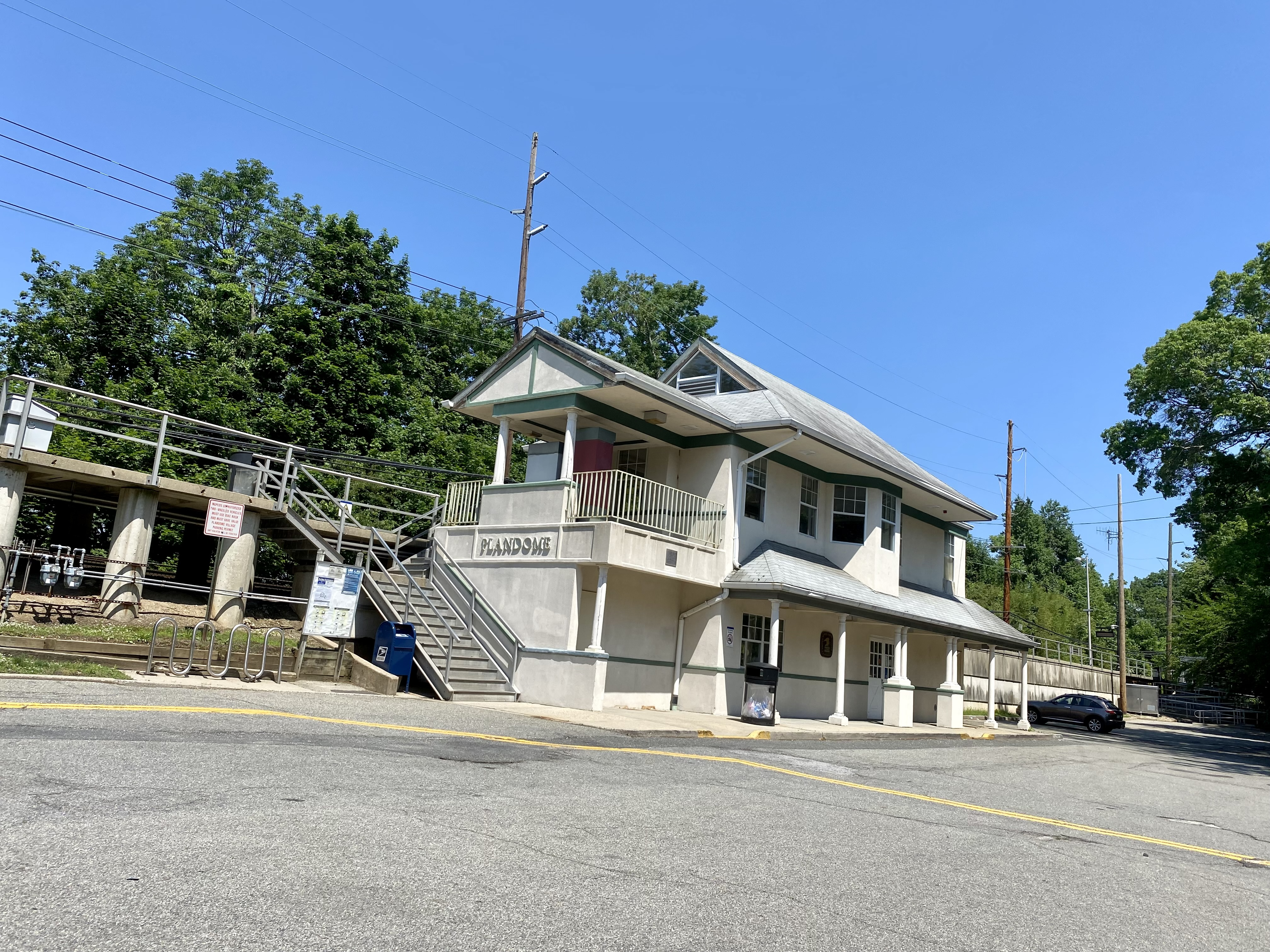
The Plandome Long Island Rail Road station in 2021

The Plandome station on the Long Island Rail Road's Port Washington Branch is located within the village. Plandome residents are able to obtain village parking permits in order to park at the station's two village-owned parking lots.

The Plandome Post Office is located within the station building, on the ground floor, below the waiting room.

==== Bus ====
There are no bus routes which run through (or otherwise directly serve) Plandome.

=== Utilities ===
==== Natural gas ====
National Grid USA provides natural gas to homes and businesses that are hooked up to natural gas lines in Plandome.

==== Power ====
PSEG Long Island provides power to the entirety of Plandome, on behalf of the Long Island Power Authority.

===== Street lighting =====
As of August 2021, Welsbach Electric is Plandome's street lighting contractor, which maintains the village's street lights under contract with the village.

==== Sewage ====
Plandome is not connected to any sanitary sewer systems. Accordingly, all areas and properties within the village rely on cesspools and septic systems.

==== Trash collection ====
As of March 2026, trash collection services in Plandome are provided by Meadow Carting, under contract with the Village of Plandome.

==== Water ====
Plandome is served by the village-owned and operated Plandome Water System, which exclusively serves and provides the village with water.

=== Healthcare and emergency services ===
==== Fire ====
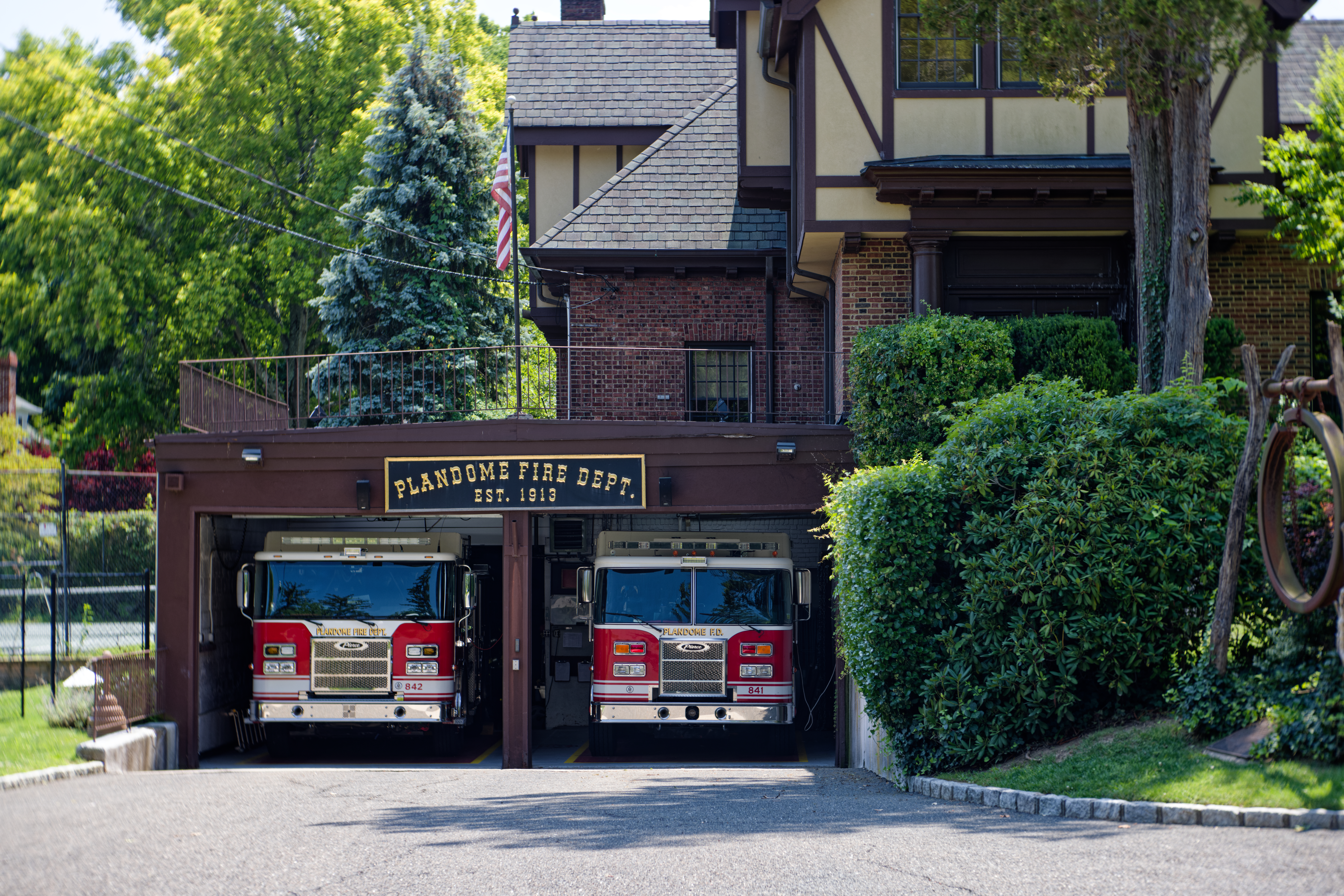
The Plandome Fire Department's station and engines in 2023

Plandome is protected by the Plandome Fire Department, which exclusively serves the village. The department maintains its headquarters and fire station at Plandome Village Hall, in the heart of the village.

==== Police ====
The Plandome Police Department, which exclusively served the village, was absorbed into the Nassau County Police Department in 1975. Police service is now provided by the Nassau County Police Department's Sixth Precinct. Two patrol cars are assigned to patrol the village's territory at all times.

==== Healthcare ====
There are no hospitals located within Plandome. The nearest hospitals to the village are St. Francis Hospital in Flower Hill and North Shore University Hospital in Manhasset.

== Landmarks ==
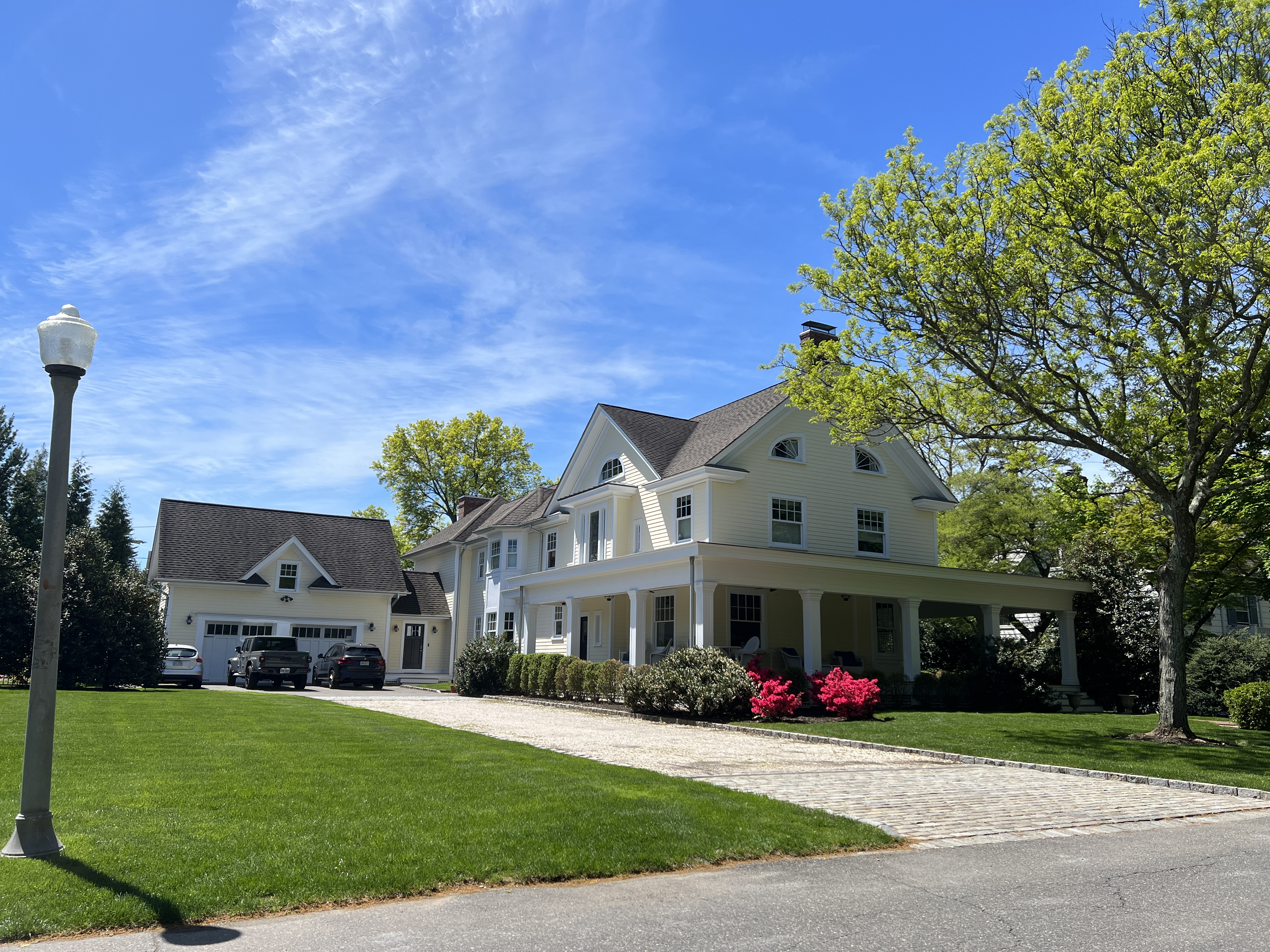
The Almeron and Olive Smith House in 2023

The Willets Farmhouse – for centuries a prominent structure in the area – was built circa 1810, by brewer George Willets of the Willets family of Cow Neck. The Almeron and Olive Smith House at 50 South Drive is dated to 1907 and was listed on the National Register of Historic Places in 2006.

== Notable people ==
- Bruce R. Bent, founder of the Reserve Fund, first money fund
- Otto Blackwell, executive for American Telephone & Telegraph; lived on North Drive
- Roger Bullard, architect
- Vernon and Irene Castle (1887–1918, 1893–1969), famous and influential husband-and-wife ballroom dance team
- Arthur G. Elvin, engineer, inventor, and politician who served as one of Plandome's mayors and the first mayor of nearby Flower Hill
- Melissa Errico, Broadway actress, songwriter, singer
- Norman "Boomer" Esiason, NFL quarterback and sports broadcaster
- Catherine Galbraith (1913–2008), author
- John Kenneth Galbraith (1908–2006), economist, diplomat, and author
- Kenny Gardner (1913–2002), singer, Guy Lombardo's Royal Canadians
- Robert MacCrate (1921–2016), attorney, partner and vice chairman of Sullivan & Cromwell, former president of the American Bar Association
- Samuel L. Mitchill (1764–1831), U.S. senator, member U.S. House of Representatives, physician, lawyer, and educator
- Bill O'Reilly, television host, political commentator
- Bobby Riggs (1918–1995), tennis champion
- Erika Slezak, Daytime Emmy award-winning actress
- Jo Spier (1900–1978), Dutch artist and illustrator who emigrated to the US
- Genesta M. Strong (1885–1972), first woman from Nassau County to be elected to the New York State Legislature, elected in 1944
- Kenny Williams (1914–1984), television announcer, actor, radio actor

== In popular culture ==
Over the years, Plandome has been used to film – and has been mentioned in – several films and commercials. This includes chase scenes for a film featuring Hal Holbrook, which were filmed at the Plandome LIRR station. Many other films and commercials have been filmed at the station, particularly on its platform.

== See also ==
- List of municipalities in New York
- Plandome Heights, New York
- Plandome Manor, New York
