= Virginia Portia Royall Inness-Brown =

American proponent of the arts

- Born: 1901; Medford, Massachusetts, U.S.
- Died: 1990 (aged 88–89); New York City, New York, U.S.

Virginia Portia Royall Inness-Brown (1901–1990), also known as Virginia Inness-Brown, was a proponent of the arts and first recipient of New York City's Handel Medallion in 1959.

== Biography ==
Virginia Portia Royall was born in Medford, Massachusetts on May 4, 1901, the daughter of John Allen Crosskeys Royall and Agatha Caroline Freeman. She married New York publisher Hugh Alwyn Inness-Brown Sr. on March 26, 1921, in Lillington, North Carolina. They lived in Plandome Manor, Nassau County, New York and had four children: Page Inness-Brown (Tharpe), Hugh Alwyn Inness-Brown Jr, Virginia Inness-Brown (Conn), and Constance Inness-Brown Von Valkenburg. Her granddaughter Elizabeth Inness-Brown is a novelist and educator. Virginia's husband, Hugh, died of a heart attack in their New York home in 1972. Virginia died of congestive heart failure in Damariscotta, Maine on August 8, 1990.

== Cultural activities ==
Inness-Brown was a philanthropist listed in the social register. She was also a member and officer of the American National Theatre and Academy (ANTA). She served as the vice-chairman of the International Cultural Exchange of ANTA, 1954–63, national vice-president, 1963–66, vice-chairman, Performing Arts Program "Salute to France", 1954–55, and was chairman of the Drama, Dance, and Theatre Panels of ANTA. She was the international delegate of ANTA to Poland in 1963. In 1966, Inness-Brown was the president and chairman of the American corporation for the first Festival of Negro Arts, also known as the World Festival of Black Arts, held in Dakar, Senegal, a role controversial in the international community.
