= Manhasset station =

Long Island Rail Road station in Nassau County, New York

Manhasset
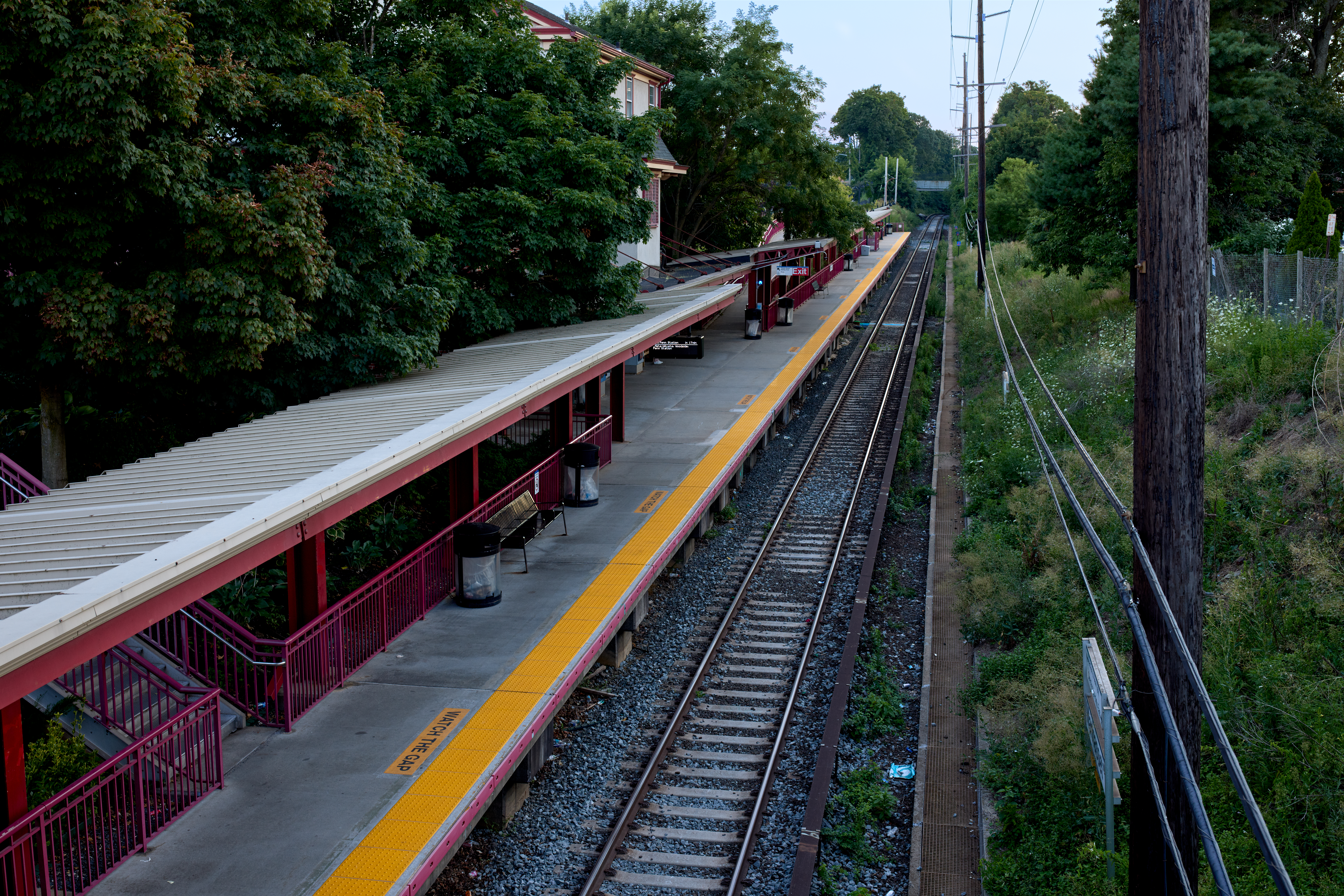
- The Manhasset station, as seen from Plandome Road

General information
- Location: Plandome Road & Maple Place; Manhasset, New York
- Coordinates: 40.79669°N 73.699996°W
- Owner: Long Island Rail Road
- Line: Port Washington Branch
- Distance: 15.4 mi (24.8 km) from Long Island City
- Platforms: 1 side platform
- Tracks: 1
- Connections: Nassau Inter-County Express: n20H, n20X, n21 (at Northern Boulevard); Village of North Hills Shuttle

Construction
- Parking: Yes
- Accessible: Yes

Other information
- Station code: MHT
- Fare zone: 4

History
- Opened: 1899
- Rebuilt: 1925, 1999–2001
- Electrified: October 21, 1913; 750 V (DC) third rail

Passengers
- 2012—2014: 5,117 per weekday
- Rank: 23 of 125

Services
Preceding station	Long Island Rail Road	Following station
Great Neck toward Penn Station or Grand Central	Port Washington Branch	Plandome toward Port Washington
Location

Manhasset is a station on the Long Island Rail Road's Port Washington Branch in Manhasset, New York. It is located at Plandome Road and Maple Place, off Park Avenue – five blocks north of Northern Boulevard (NY 25A). It is located approximately 17.2 miles (27.7 km) east of Penn Station in Midtown Manhattan.

== History ==
Manhasset station was built by the Great Neck and Port Washington Railroad in 1899, the year after the Manhasset Viaduct was completed. It was the penultimate station along the branch until Plandome station was built to the northeast in 1909.

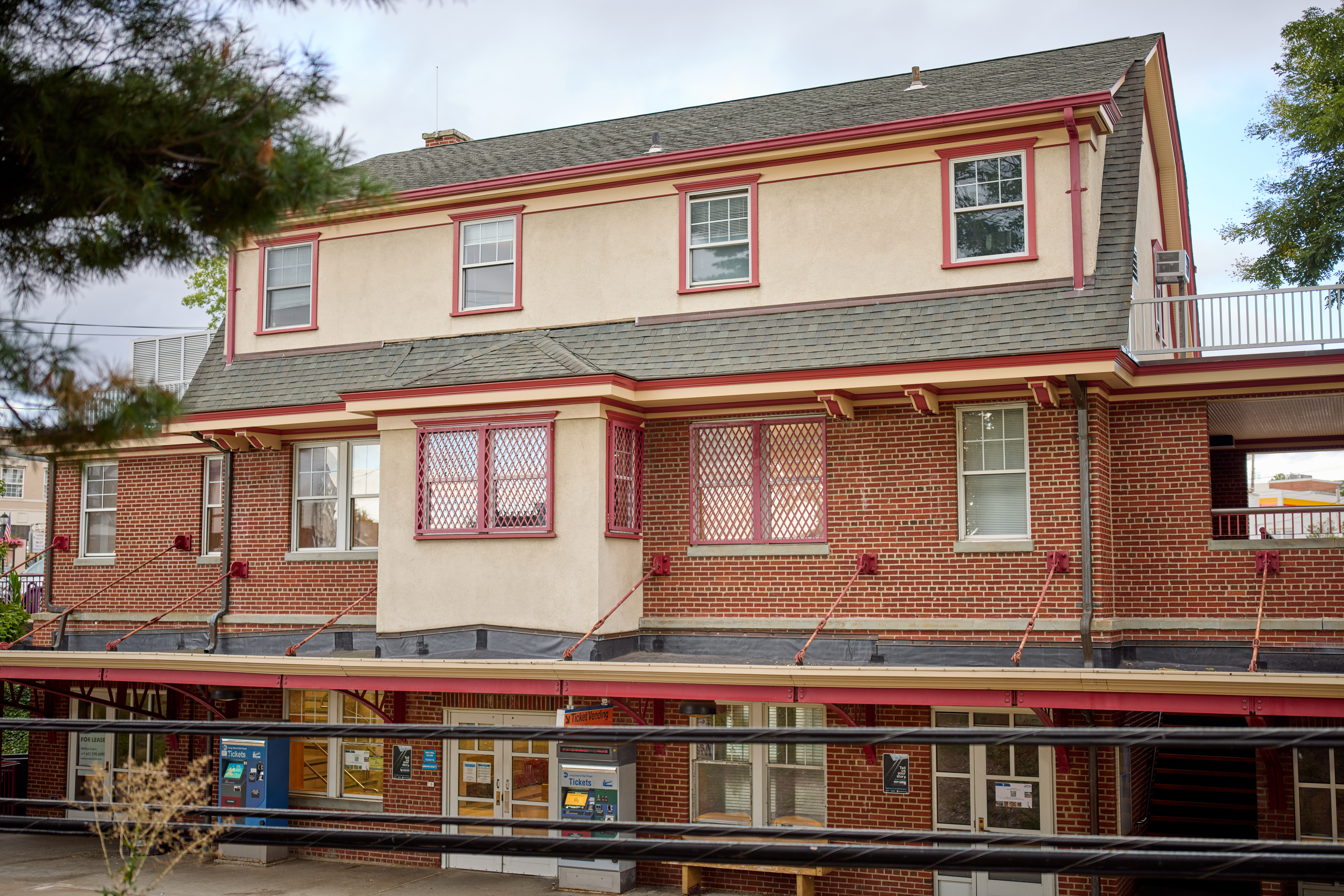
The Manhasset station house

Though a smaller wooden structure was originally built in 1899, the station was rebuilt in 1924, at which time the current station house – constructed in the Dutch-colonial style typical of stations such as Riverhead, Bay Shore, Northport, and Mineola – was erected.

A high-level platform was installed at the station in the 1970s, allowing the LIRR's new M1 electric multiple unit railcars – which required high-level platforms – to serve the station.

The station was renovated between 1999 and 2001, with the addition of more canopies and staircases, as well as a restoration of the station house.

In 2020, the Manhasset Park District – which owns and operates the commuter parking fields at the Manhasset station – assumed responsibility for the landscaping of the station grounds, at the request of residents of the community.

== Station layout ==
The station has one 10-car long side platform on the south side of the track.

== Station parking ==
The Manhasset station features several commuter parking fields for station passengers. All of these parking facilities are owned and operated by the Manhasset Park District.

The parking facilities at the station are typically reserved primarily for Manhasset Park District residents with a valid, district-issued parking permit, with limited parking spaces for non-residents and other, non-permit holders also available on a first-come, first-serve basis at an increased parking fee rate.

The parking facilities at the station – combined with the electrified, frequent service on the Port Washington Branch (which is the only branch that does not stop at Jamaica) have contributed to the high passenger count at the station, with commuters from nearby communities outside of the Manhasset Park District's boundaries – primarily those communities with stations along the Oyster Bay Branch and Port Jefferson Branch – driving to, parking at, and using the Manhasset station in lieu of stations like Roslyn on the Oyster Bay Branch or ones as far away as in Suffolk County, along the Port Jefferson Branch; the Oyster Bay Branch is non-electrified north and east of East Williston, while the Port Jefferson Branch electrification ends at Huntington.

== See also ==
- List of Long Island Rail Road stations
- History of the Long Island Rail Road
