= Handel Medallion =

- Location: New York City
- Country: United States
- Presented by: The City of New York, United States
- Reward: Medallion
- First award: 1959

The Handel Medallion is an American award presented by the City of New York. It is the city's highest award given to individuals for their contribution to the city's intellectual and cultural life.

== Establishment ==
The award was first issued in 1959 to Virginia Portia Royall Inness-Brown, upon the 200th anniversary of the death of George Frideric Handel (1685–1759), the German-British Baroque composer, noted for his operas, oratorios, anthems and organ concertos. The award was established under New York City Mayor Robert F. Wagner Jr.

== Award winners ==
Year	Recipient	Notes
1959	Virginia Portia Royall Inness-Brown (1901–1990)	
1964	Sidney Poitier (1927–2022)	
1965	Joseph B. Martinson (1914–1970)	
1966	David Sarnoff, Justino Diaz, and Lionel Hampton	
1967	Richard Rodgers (1902–1979), William Schuman	
1968	Janet D. Schenck	
1969	Claire Raphael Reis	
1970	Martha Graham, George Balanchine, Aaron Copland, Alice Tully	
1971	Joseph Papp	
1972	Harold Arlen, Charlie Chaplin, Elia Kazan, Dizzy Gillespie	
1973	Duke Ellington, Melissa Hayden, Lincoln Kirstein, Beverly Sills	
1974	Oratorio Society of New York	
1975	Joshua Logan	
1976	George Abbott, Margot Fonteyn, Agnes de Mille, Jerome Robbins	
1977	Marian Anderson, Leonard Bernstein	
1978	Elliott Carter	
1980	Marilyn Horne	
1981	Lena Horne	
1982	John Lennon	
1985	Leontyne Price	
1986	Alexandra Danilova, Antony Tudor	
1988	Alvin Ailey	
1989	Charles Wadsworth	
1993	Robert Merrill, Arthur Mitchell	
1997	Skitch Henderson (1918–2005)	
1999	Merce Cunningham	
2002	Licia Albanese, Roberta Peters	
2008	Neil Simon	
2009	Jessye Norman	
2010	Judith Jamison	
2011	Stephen Sondheim	
2013	Harvey Lichtenstein	

Years unknown:

- Ivan Davis
- Justino Díaz
- Geraldine Fitzgerald
- Benny Goodman
- Gary Graffman
- Kitty Carlisle Hart
- Robert Joffrey
- Vincent La Selva
- Jaime Laredo
- Yehudi Menuhin
- Renata Tebaldi
- Peter Wilhousky

== See also ==
- List of awards for contributions to culture
