= Plandome Manor, New York =

- Village
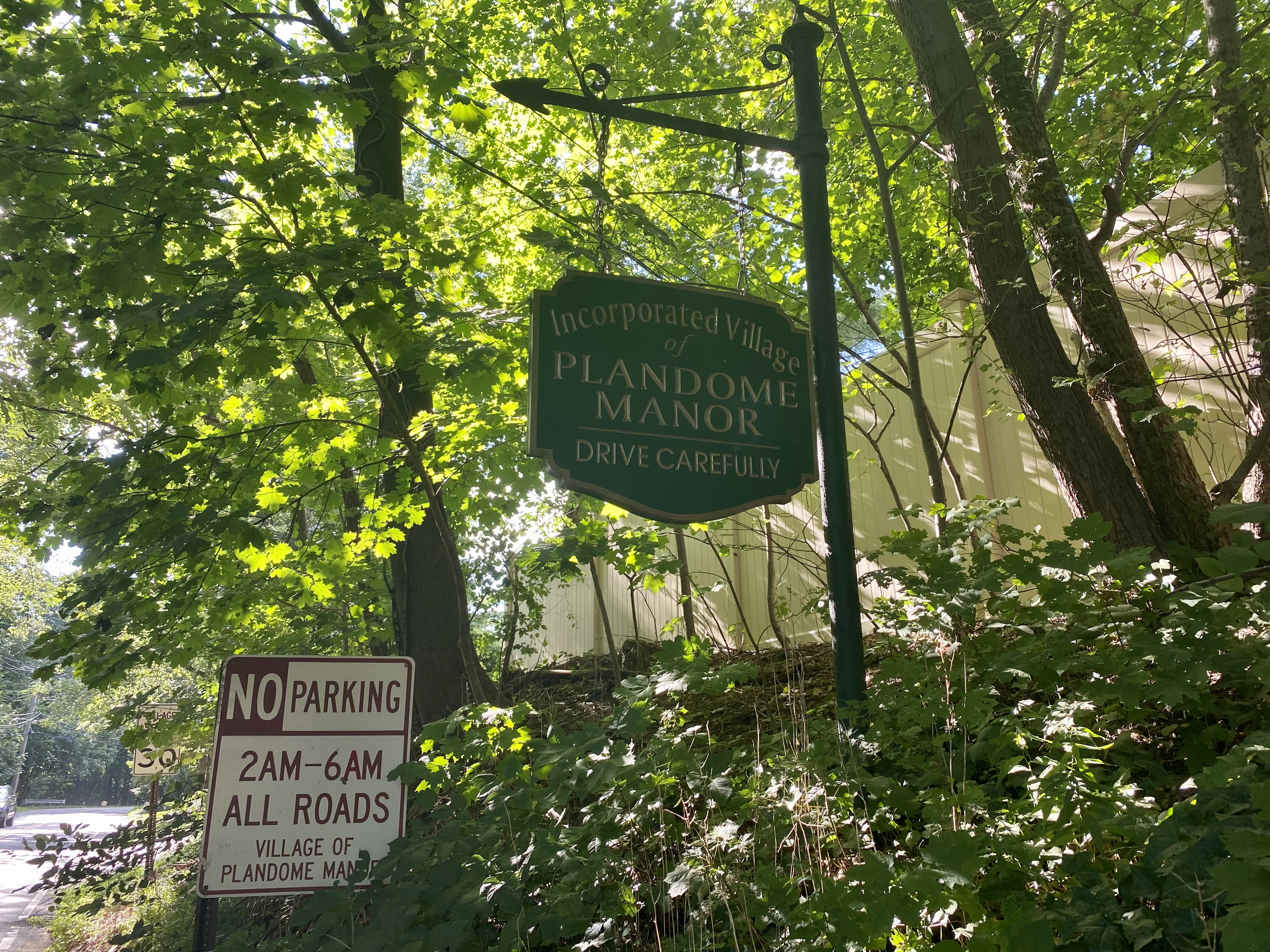
- A village entrance sign on Stonytown Road at the Flower Hill–Plandome Manor border

- Official Seal of Plandome Manor

- Location in Nassau County and the state of New York

- Location on Long Island Location within the state of New York
- Coordinates: 40°48′54″N 73°41′57″W
- Country: United States
- State: New York
- County: Nassau
- Town: North Hempstead
- Incorporated: 1931
- Named for: Latin phrase "Planus Domus," meaning "plain, or level home"

Government
  - Body: Board of Trustees
  - Mayor: Barbara Donno
  - Deputy Mayor: Matthew Clinton
  - Trustees: Trustees' List: • James Baydar, Esq.; • Peter Kulka; • Patricia O'Neill, R.A.

Area
  - Total: 0.63 sq mi (1.64 km^{2})
  - Land: 0.54 sq mi (1.40 km^{2})
  - Water: 0.093 sq mi (0.24 km^{2})
- Elevation: 36 ft (11 m)

Population (2020)
  - Total: 793
  - Density: 1,463.9/sq mi (565.21/km^{2})
- Time zone: UTC−5 (Eastern (EST))
  - Summer (DST): UTC−4 (EDT)
- ZIP Codes: 11030 (Plandome); 11050 (Port Washington)
- Area codes: 516, 363
- FIPS code: 36-58497
- GNIS feature ID: 0960670
- Website: plandomemanorny.gov

Plandome Manor is a village in Nassau County, on the North Shore of Long Island, in New York, United States. The majority of the village is considered part of the Greater Manhasset area, which is anchored by Manhasset. The easternmost portion, however, is more closely associated with Port Washington. The population was 793 at the time of the 2020 census.

The Incorporated Village of Plandome Manor is in the Town of North Hempstead, and is the northernmost of the three Plandomes.

== History ==
The Village of Plandome Manor incorporated in 1931, spurred in part by opposition to a proposal to install sanitary sewers in the area by the Manhasset Sewer District. The following year, the village annexed the territory occupied by the Plandome Country Club, which had not been included within the limits of the original territory for the village.

Like the villages of Plandome and Plandome Heights to its south, Plandome Manor derives its name from the Latin 'Planus Domus', meaning plain, or level home. The manor house of Matthias Nicoll who was an early mayor of New York City and among the first generation of the Nicoll family on Long Island, was a wood-frame home built in the 1670s, and one of the first homesteads in this area of Cow Neck, the namesake of the Cow Neck Peninsula (also known as the Manhasset/Port Washington Peninsula). The manor itself was torn down in 1998 and replaced with another estate.

Author Frances H. Burnett, author of The Secret Garden, built her home, Fairseat, in Plandome Park in 1908, and lived there until her death in 1924. Burnett's son, Vivian, and his wife Constance, had erected a home nearby on Bayview Road after their marriage. Following Frances Burnett's death, her nephew, publisher Archer P. Fahnestock moved into Fairseat, but the home burned down leaving only the stucco carriage house and garden intact. In 1940, Fahnestock sold it to Leroy Grumman.

== Geography ==
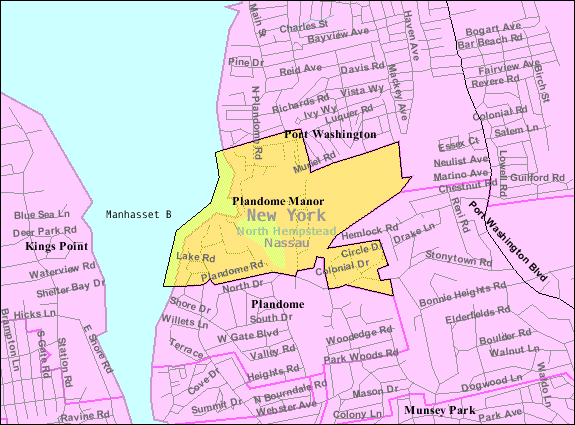
U.S. Census map of Plandome Manor

According to the United States Census Bureau, the village has a total area of 0.6 square miles (1.6 km^{2}), of which 0.5 square miles (1.3 km^{2}) is land and 0.1 square miles (0.26 km^{2}), or 13.56%, is water – including Leeds Pond.

=== Topography ===
According to the United States Environmental Protection Agency and the United States Geological Survey, the highest point in Plandome Manor is located at the Plandome Country Club's (and the village's) northeastern corner, at roughly 160 feet (49 m), and the lowest point is Manhasset Bay, which is at sea level.

=== Drainage ===
Plandome Manor is located within the Leeds Pond Sub-watershed (part of the Manhasset Bay Watershed), and is located within the larger Long Island Sound/Atlantic Ocean Watershed.

== Demographics ==
Historical population
Census	Pop.	Note	%±
1940	262		—
1950	323		23.3%
1960	705		118.3%
1970	835		18.4%
1980	883		5.7%
1990	790		−10.5%
2000	838		6.1%
2010	872		4.1%
2020	793		−9.1%
U.S. Decennial Census

As of the census of 2000, there were 838 people, 281 households, and 241 families residing in the village. The population density was 1,637.6 inhabitants per square mile (632.3/km^{2}). There were 288 housing units at an average density of 562.8 per square mile (217.3/km^{2}). The racial makeup of the village was 92.12% White, 0.36% African American, 5.49% Asian, 0.84% from other races, and 1.19% from two or more races. Hispanic or Latino of any race were 2.27% of the population.

There were 281 households, out of which 42.3% had children under the age of 18 living with them, 80.4% were married couples living together, 3.2% had a female householder with no husband present, and 13.9% were non-families. Of all households 12.8% were made up of individuals, and 8.9% had someone living alone who was 65 years of age or older. The average household size was 2.98 and the average family size was 3.24.

In the village, the population was spread out, with 28.2% under the age of 18, 4.5% from 18 to 24, 23.4% from 25 to 44, 26.8% from 45 to 64, and 17.1% who were 65 years of age or older. The median age was 42 years. For every 100 females, there were 91.8 males. For every 100 females age 18 and over, there were 90.5 males.

The median income for a household in the village was $176,959, and the median income for a family was $193,496. Males had a median income of $100,000 versus $69,583 for females. The per capita income for the village was $77,276. About 2.0% of families and 2.2% of the population were below the poverty line, including 2.1% of those under age 18 and none of those age 65 or over.

== Government ==
=== Village government ===
As of June 2025, the Mayor of Plandome Manor is Barbara Donno, the Deputy Mayor of Plandome Manor is Matthew Clinton, and the Trustees of Plandome Manor are James Baydar, Esq., Matthew Clinton, Patricia O’Neill, R.A., and Peter Kulka.

=== Village staff ===
As of June 2025, the Village staff consists of Village Clerk and Court Clerk Katherine A. Hannon, Village Treasurer Marie DePalo, Superintendent of Buildings Edward P. Butt, R.A., Village Attorney John Farrell, Esq., Village Justice Hon. Susan Katz Richman, and Village Prosecutor Richard Prisco, Esq. In 2023, Hannon was appointed Village Clerk, becoming the youngest clerk serving in local government on Long Island. She also serves as Court Clerk in the neighboring municipalities of the Village of Plandome Heights and the Village of Plandome.

=== Representation in higher government ===
==== Town representation ====
Plandome Manor is located in the Town of North Hempstead's 6th council district, which as of June 2025 is represented on the North Hempstead Town Council by Mariann Dalimonte (D–Port Washington).

==== Nassau County representation ====
Plandome Manor is located in Nassau County's 10th Legislative district, which as of June 2025 is represented in the Nassau County Legislature by Mazi Melesa Pilip.

==== New York State representation ====
===== New York State Assembly =====
Plandome Manor is located within the New York State Assembly's 16th State Assembly district, which as of June 2025 is represented by Daniel J. Norber (R–Great Neck).

===== New York State Senate =====
Plandome Manor is located in the New York State Senate's 7th State Senate district, which as of June 2025 is represented in the New York State Senate by Jack M. Martins (R–Mineola).

==== Federal representation ====
===== United States Congress =====
Plandome Manor is located in New York's 3rd congressional district, which as of June 2025 is represented in the United States Congress by Thomas R. Suozzi (D–Glen Cove).

==== United States Senate ====
Like the rest of New York, Plandome Manor is represented in the United States Senate by Charles Schumer (D) and Kirsten Gillibrand (D).

=== Politics ===
In the 2024 U.S. presidential election, the majority of Plandome Manor voters voted for Donald Trump (R).

== Education ==
=== School districts ===
Plandome Manor is primarily located with the boundaries of (and is thus served by) the Manhasset Union Free School District. However, most of the eastern portion of the village is served by the Port Washington Union Free School District. As such, students who reside within Plandome Manor and attend public schools go to school in one of these two districts, depending on where in Plandome Manor they live.

=== Library districts ===
Plandome Manor is within the boundaries of the Manhasset Library District and the Port Washington Library District. The boundaries for these districts within Plandome Manor roughly correspond with those of the respective school districts.

== Media ==
=== Newspapers ===
The Manhasset Press Times is the newspaper of record for the Village of Plandome Manor. It is part of Schneps Media.

Other major newspapers serving Plandome Manor include Newsday, New York Post, The New York Times, and The Wall Street Journal.

=== Television ===
Plandome Manor is one of North Shore TV's fourteen member villages. North Shore TV provides Plandome Manor and the other member villages with public-access television programming, through Optimum and Verizon Fios – the main cable television providers in the area.

== Parks and recreation ==
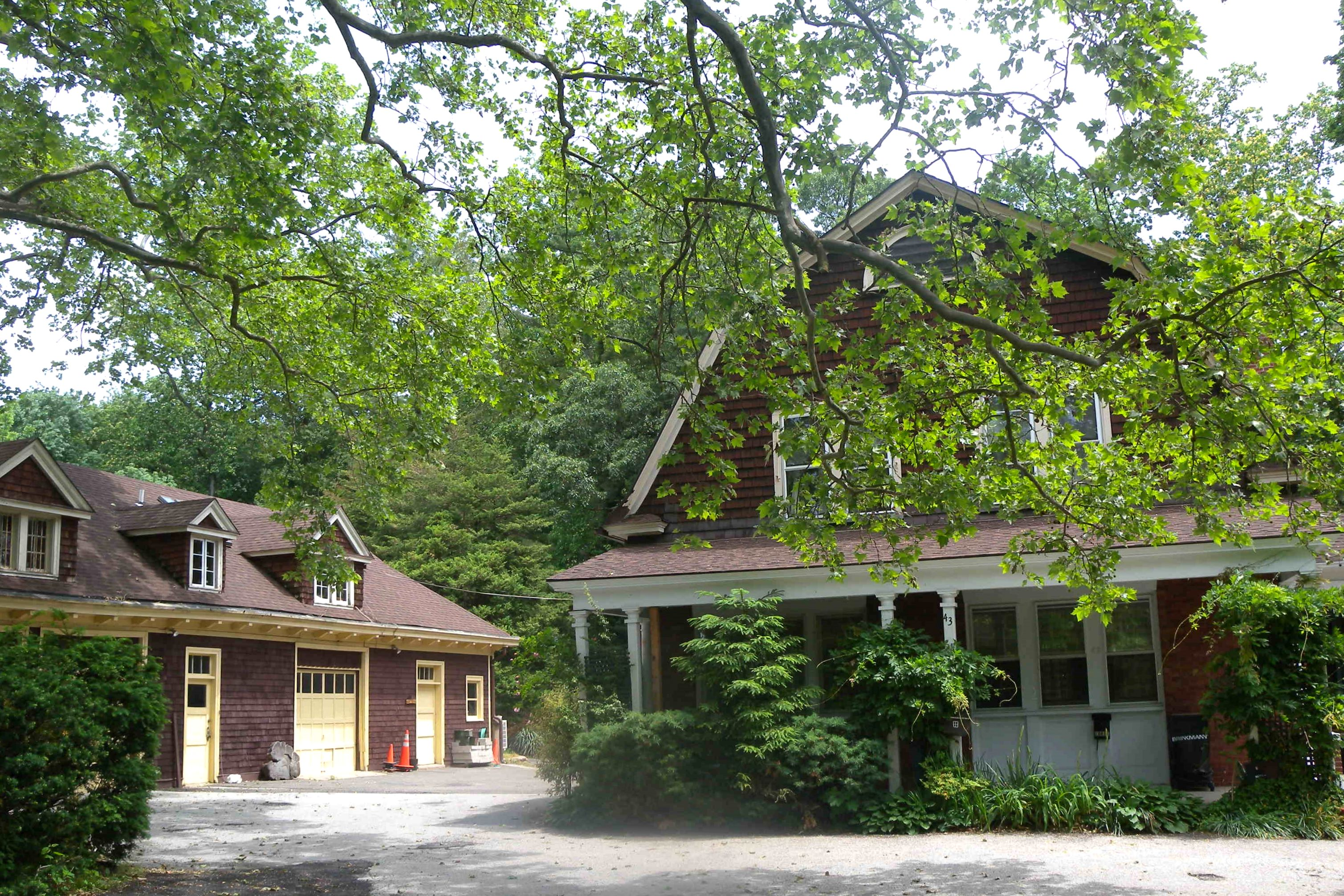
The Science Museum of Long Island, located within the Leeds Pond Preserve

Located within the village boundaries – and taking almost one-third of its total territory – is the private members club, Plandome Country Club. The club opened in 1931 as the Plandome Golf Club. The owner's purchased the land from the Leeds family, which owned a nearby estate. They originally intended to build a major residential development but changed the plans to instead build a golf course, in part due to the Stock Market Crash in 1929. Architect Orrin Smith was responsible for designing the golf course. The Plandome Golf Club became the Plandome Country Club in 1955. A major fire broke out in the clubhouse during a snowstorm during the night hours on December 23, 1958. The clubhouse was damaged beyond repair and was replaced with the current building around 1959. The new clubhouse was designed by architect Manoug Exerjian.

Also within the village is Nassau County's Leeds Pond Preserve, which is home to the Science Museum of Long Island.

== Infrastructure ==
=== Transportation ===
==== Road ====
Major roads in Plandome Manor include North Plandome Road, Plandome Road, and Stonytown Road.

==== Rail ====
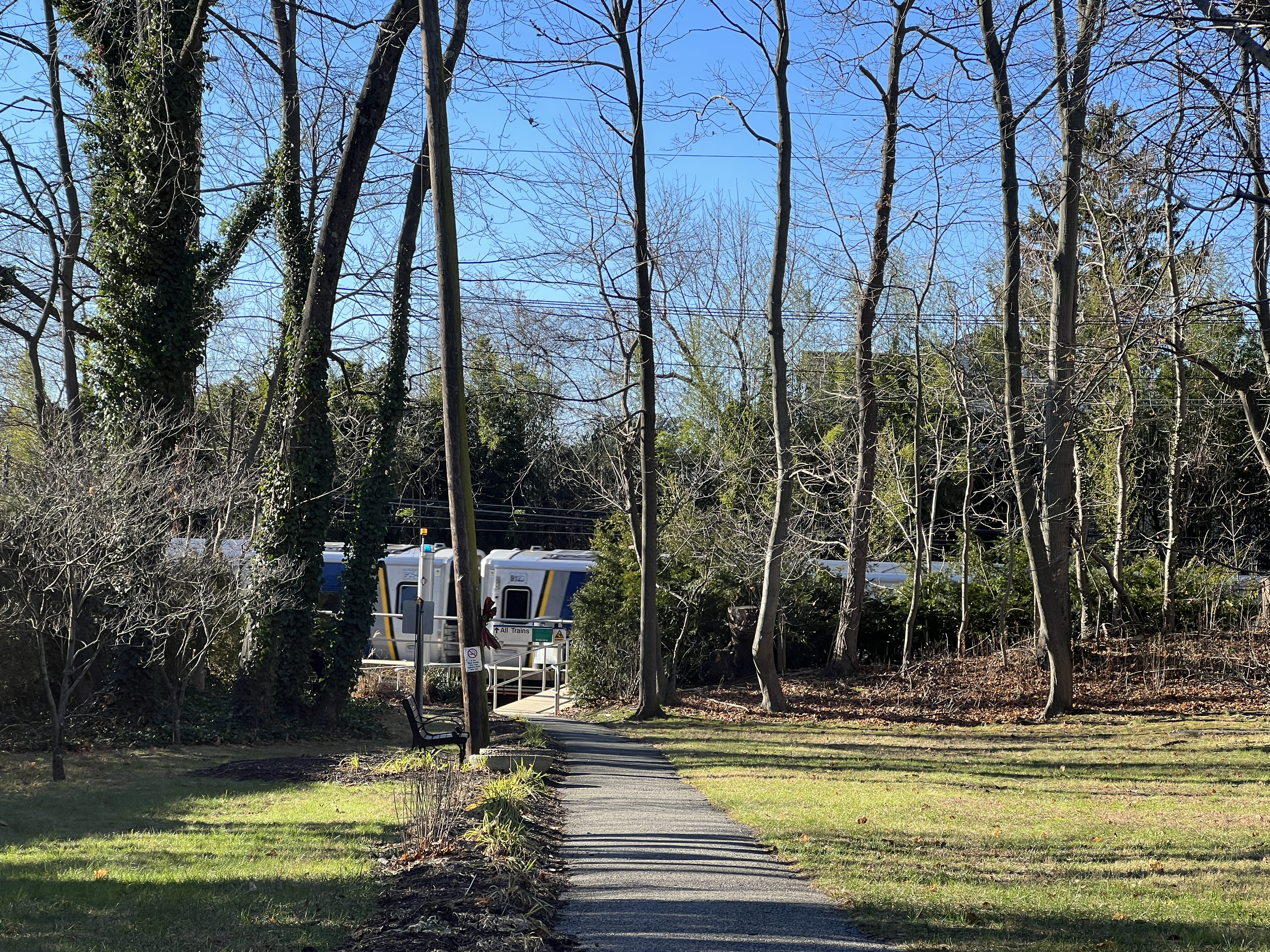
The walkway between the Plandome LIRR station and Circle Drive in 2022

The Plandome station on the Long Island Rail Road's Port Washington Branch is the nearest train station to the village. It is located primarily within the adjacent village of Plandome, with the northern extremes of the platform being within Plandome Manor. There is a parking lot at the station reserved exclusively for Plandome Manor residents, and a walkway exists between the station and Circle Drive.

=== Utilities ===
==== Natural gas ====
National Grid USA provides natural gas to homes and businesses that are hooked up to natural gas lines in Plandome Manor.

==== Power ====
PSEG Long Island provides power to all homes and businesses within Plandome Manor, on behalf of the Long Island Power Authority.

==== Sewage ====
Plandome Manor is not connected to any sanitary sewer systems. As such, all areas within the village rely on cesspools and septic systems.

==== Trash collection ====
As of 2025, trash collection services in Plandome Manor are provided by Meadow Carting, under contract with the Village of Plandome Manor.

==== Water ====
Plandome Manor is located primarily within the boundaries of the Manhasset–Lakeville Water District, although a small portion of the easternmost section of the village is within the boundaries of and is served by the Port Washington Water District.

== Notable people ==
- Ray Bolger (1904–1987), actor (The Wizard of Oz).
- Frances Hodgson Burnett (1849–1924), playwright, author, wrote The Secret Garden while living in Plandome Manor.
- Leroy Grumman (1895–1982), co-founder, Grumman Aerospace Corp.
- Virginia Portia Royall Inness-Brown (1901–1990), proponent of the arts, socialite.
- Martin W. Littleton (1872–1934), Brooklyn Congressman, D.A., and Borough President, attorney for Harry Thaw's second trial for murder of Stanford White.
- Samuel Latham Mitchill (1764–1830), U.S. Senator, physician, professor at Columbia College.
- William Fellowes Morgan, Jr. (1889–1977), commissioner of the Dept. of Markets of the City of New York.
- Matthias Nicoll (1630–1687), Mayor of New York 1672–1674, Speaker of the first Colonial Assembly.
- John Hay Whitney (1904–1982), U.S. Ambassador, publisher, horse breeder, socialite.

== See also ==
- List of municipalities in New York
- Plandome, New York
- Plandome Heights, New York
