= Plandome station =

Long Island Rail Road station in Nassau County, New York

Plandome
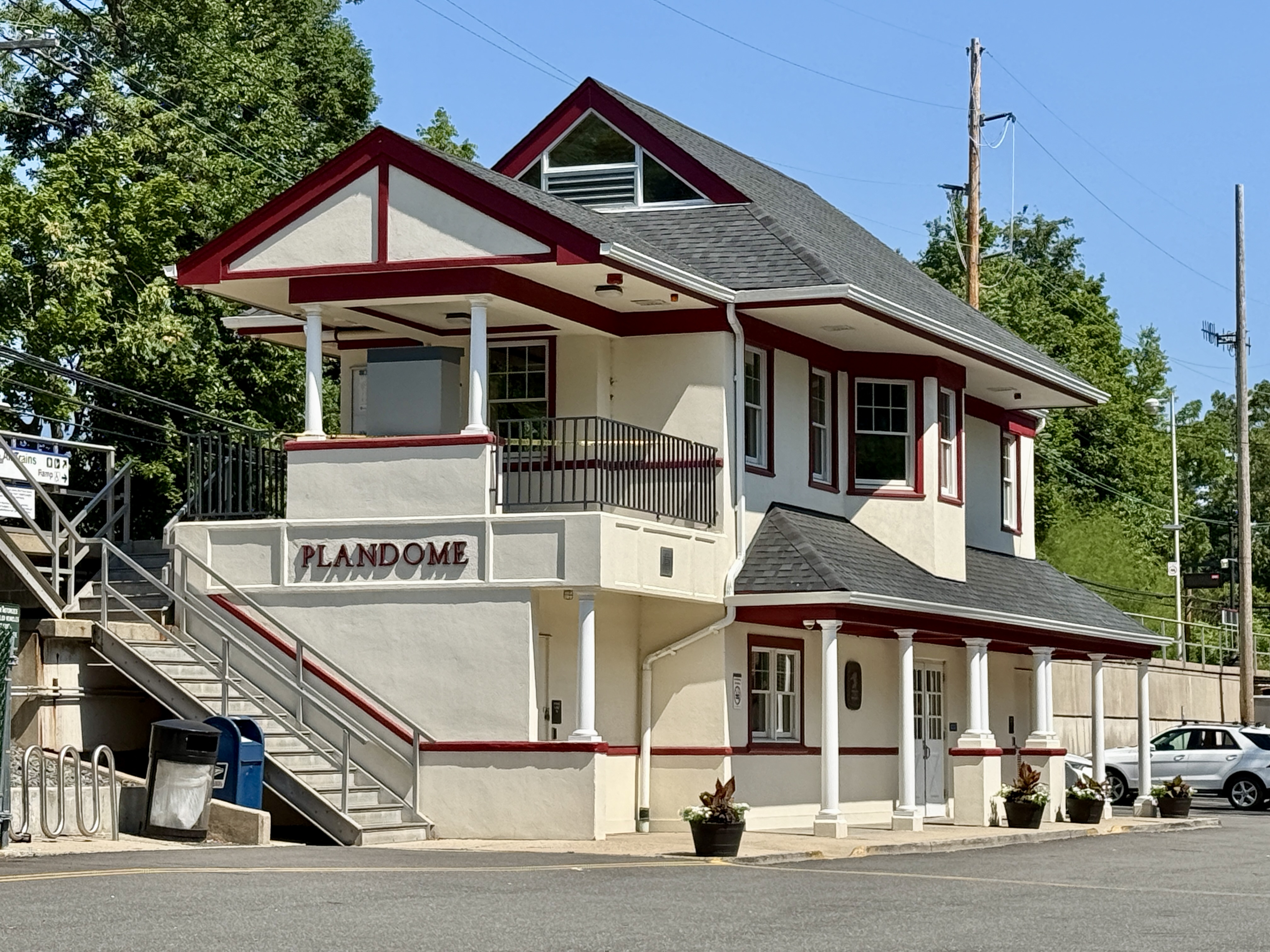
- Plandome station in 2026. The Plandome Post Office is on the ground floor, beneath the waiting room.

General information
- Location: Stonytown Road & Rockwood Road; Plandome, New York
- Coordinates: 40.810687°N 73.695216°W
- Owner: Long Island Rail Road
- Line: Port Washington Branch
- Distance: 16.5 mi (26.6 km) from Long Island City
- Platforms: 1 side platform
- Tracks: 1

Construction
- Parking: Yes (residential permits & privately owned)
- Cycle facilities: Yes
- Accessible: Yes

Other information
- Station code: PDM
- Fare zone: 4

History
- Opened: 1909
- Rebuilt: 1966, 1988–1990
- Electrified: October 21, 1913; 750 V (DC) third rail

Passengers
- 2012—2014: 1,135 per weekday
- Rank: 73 of 125

Services
Preceding station	Long Island Rail Road	Following station
Manhasset toward Penn Station or Grand Central	Port Washington Branch	Port Washington Terminus
Location

Plandome is a station on the Long Island Rail Road's Port Washington Branch in the villages of Plandome and Plandome Manor, in Nassau County, Long Island, New York. It is located off Stonytown Road and Rockwood Road, near West Circle Drive and Colonial Drive. The Plandome Post Office is located on the first floor, below the station's waiting room.

The station also serves as the location of the Plandome Branch of the United States Postal Service's Manhasset, NY 11030 post office.

== History ==
Plandome station was built in 1909, and as such was the last station to be built on the Port Washington Branch until the World's Fair station opened in Queens in 1939. The track was first laid in 1898 with the building of the Manhasset Viaduct, which allowed for the extension of the railroad line from Great Neck to Port Washington; the stone bridge carrying the track over Stonytown Road was built as part of this extension. Plandome was a flag stop on the extended line until the station was built in 1909.

In 1939, the New York State Public Service Commission – at the request of the Village of Plandome – announced that it would construct the pedestrian underpass on the north side of Stonytown Road, underneath the bridge carrying the track and station over the road. Previously, Plandome residents needed to step off the sidewalk when they reached the road's underpass, and then walk on the road beneath it until reaching the other side, in order to access the station platform. Accordingly, the construction of the pedestrian underpass would eliminate this safety hazard and improve pedestrian access to the station.

In 1966, the platform at the Plandome station was reconstructed; the platform was raised from track level to allow for level boarding. Plandome was one of nine Long Island Rail Road stations to receive new, raised platforms as part of the first phase of a three-year, systemwide modernization project – the other eight stations being Carle Place, New Hyde Park, Merillon Avenue, and Westbury on the Main Line, and Douglaston, Little Neck, Manhasset, and Port Washington on the Port Washington Branch.

On November 7, 1977, a windstorm caused a tree to fall onto the rear two cars of an eight-car, Penn Station-bound train at the Plandome station, which was carrying roughly 100 passengers. In addition to striking the train, the tree knocked down power lines and blocked the one track, suspending service on the branch for roughly 90 minutes and briefly leaving roughly 3,000 area residents without electricity. No injuries were caused by the incident.

During the early morning hours on January 3, 1987, the original station house burned in a fire set by an 18-year-old vandal from Port Washington. The Plandome Fire Department had historically used the station for drill exercises and thus had an advantage if and when an actual fire occurred there. The station was subsequently rebuilt between 1988 and 1990 – the platform was lengthened to accommodate 10-car trains and a new station building was constructed. The new station building opened by 1990 to more modern standards, with turn-of-the-century characteristics and ticket vending machines in lieu of a ticket clerk; it was designed by local architect Frank J. Capone. The reconstruction of the station building was supervised and funded by the Village of Plandome, in cooperation with the LIRR.

In 2023, renovations were made to the station and the station building. Additionally, in September 2023, a box truck struck the bridge carrying the train track and platform above Stonytown Road. The bridge strike temporarily suspended train service east of Great Neck and closed Stonytown Road; damage to the structure was minimal and both the station and road reopened later that day.

== Station layout ==
This station has one 10-car-long side platform, located on the east side of the track.

== Plandome Post Office ==
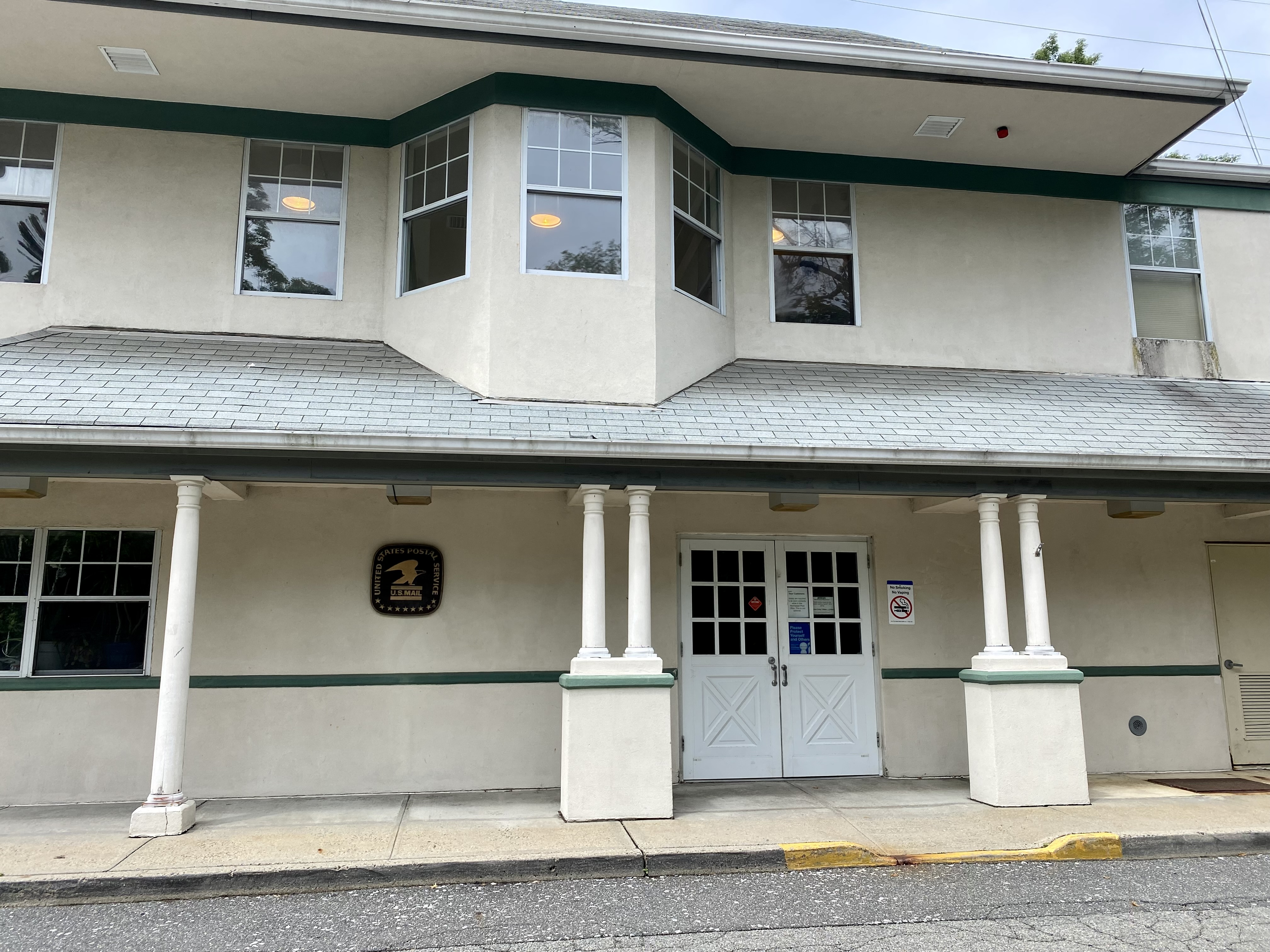
The Plandome Post Office in 2021.

The Plandome Post Office is a classified branch of the Manhasset, NY 11030 United States Post Office, in the Incorporated Village of Plandome in Nassau County, on Long Island, in New York, United States. It is located inside the station house at the Plandome Long Island Rail Road station.

=== History ===
From its establishment until 1943, the Plandome Post Office was separate from the Manhasset Post Office. Its service area included all of the Incorporated Villages of Plandome and Plandome Manor, in addition to part of the Incorporated Village of Flower Hill; approximately 400 families resided within the Plandome Post Office's service area at the time of the merger. The merger, which took place on September 1, 1943, reclassified the Plandome Post Office as a classified branch of the Manhasset, NY 11030 Post Office; this reclassification enabled the customers served by the Plandome Post Office to receive home delivery services from the post office.

Like the rest of Plandome Station's station house, the Plandome Post Office burned in January 1987, after vandals set fire to the building; the fire destroyed roughly 150 post office boxes and their contents. A temporary post office structure was used until a new, permanent one was built. The post office, like the rest of the station building, was rebuilt by 1990, with a more modern post office located on the ground floor, just below the train station's platform level waiting room. The reconstruction of the building was supervised and funded by the Village of Plandome, in cooperation with the Long Island Rail Road.

== In popular culture ==
Over the years, the Plandome Long Island Rail Road station has been used to film several films and commercials. This includes chase scenes for a film featuring Hal Holbrook. Many of the films and commercials shot at the station have been filmed on the station's platform.

== See also ==
- History of the Long Island Rail Road
- List of Long Island Rail Road stations
