= North Shore TV =

Public cable TV network on Long Island, New York

NSTV (North Shore TV)
- Type: Public, educational, and government access cable television network
- Country: United States
- Motto: "Your community, Your voice."
- Headquarters: 1111 Marcus Avenue, Suite LL27, Lake Success, New York 11042
- Broadcast area: Long Island
- Established: 1984
- Official website: www.nstv.org

NSTV, also known as North Shore TV, is a public, educational, and government access (PEG) cable television network, cablecasting on Channel 20 Optimum) and Channel 37 Verizon FiOS in 14 incorporated villages within the Great Neck and Manhasset areas of Nassau County, on the North Shore of Long Island, in New York, United States.

== Description ==
NSTV was launched in 1984 as PATV, rebranded as NSTV in 2019. NSTV is located in Lake Success, New York. NSTV has received awards for Overall Excellence in Public Access and two New York Emmy nominations in the Military Program category.

North Shore TV is a 501(c)3 nonprofit organization serving the incorporated villages of Flower Hill, Great Neck, Great Neck Estates, Great Neck Plaza, Kensington, Kings Point, Lake Success, Munsey Park, North Hills, Plandome, Plandome Manor, Plandome Heights, Russell Gardens, Saddle Rock, and Thomaston.

NSTV provides training, television equipment and studio facilities to residents of the Incorporated Village of Great Neck and the other, surrounding North Shore member villages who wish to create non-commercial community programming for the cable channel. Funding for NSTV is provided through cable television franchise fees, memberships and grants.

== Programming ==
Programming includes “Teen TV” Youth Project, Veterans Project interviews with local veterans from World War II, Korean War and Vietnam Wars, Playwrights, and “Women in Technology”.

=== The Norman Hall Memorial Playwright Festival ===
The PATV Playwrights Project was renamed The Norman Hall Memorial Playwright Festival in 2016. The "Playwrights" program accepts yearly submissions from playwrights across the country. Two plays are chosen and made into a television production. "Playwrights" has collaborated with Access San Francisco and Grand Rapids (GRCTV) in interviews of authors who were local residents of San Francisco and Grand Rapids.

New York University Tisch School of the Arts Professor George Stoney was quoted saying ""New Playwrights" is an example of public access television at its best. Professionals from the community are given a chance to experiment in ways the commercial theater never affords them and do it with class."

== Awards and recognition ==
- 2008 National Award for Overall Excellence in Public Access
- New York Emmy Nomination 2013 “World War II: Our Veterans Stories”
- New York Emmy Nomination 2016 “Our Veterans’ Stories: Welcome Home”
