= Elizabeth Inness-Brown =

American novelist

- Born: Elizabeth Ann Inness-Brown; May 1, 1954 (age 72); Rochester, New York
- Education: St. Lawrence University, 1976 Columbia University, 1978
- Occupations: Novelist and educator
- Writing career
- Language: English
- Notable works: Burning Marguerite, Here, Satin Palms
- Notable awards: Pushcart Prize, VII (1982-1983)

Elizabeth Inness-Brown is an American novelist, short story writer, educator, and former contributing editor at Boulevard. She is a retired professor of English at Saint Michael’s College in Colchester, Vermont and lives in South Hero, Vermont—one of three islands comprising Grand Isle County—with her son. His father and her husband of 37 years died in June 2024. Inness-Brown has published a novel, Burning Marguerite, as well as two short story collections, titled Here and Satin Palms. Her stories and essays have appeared in The New Yorker, North American Review, Boulevard, Glimmer Train, Madcap Review, and various other journals. Inness-Brown received a National Endowment for the Arts grant for Writing in 1983 and has done writing residencies at Yaddo and The Millay Colony for the Arts. In 1982, her short story "Release, Surrender" appeared in Volume VII of the Pushcart Prize.

== Early life ==
Inness-Brown was born in Rochester, New York on May 1, 1954. She has cited her grandmother Virginia Portia Royall Inness-Brown as a partial inspiration for the title character of her novel, Burning Marguerite. When she was a child, Inness-Brown’s family moved to Louisiana, North Dakota, and Texas before settling in St. Lawrence County, New York, part of a region known as The North Country. In 2001, Inness-Brown wrote about the region in an essay titled "North Country Girls."

== Education ==
Inness-Brown received a B.A. in fine arts and English from St. Lawrence University in 1976 and an M.F.A. in creative writing from Columbia University in 1978. She was a member of the editorial staff at Columbia, a literary journal founded in 1977 by students in the Columbia University School of the Arts Graduate Writing program. Inness-Brown interviewed Grace Paley for the journal’s second issue alongside fellow staff members Celeste Conway, Laura Levine, Mark Teich, and Keith Monley, whom she would marry a decade later.

== Author ==
Inness-Brown began her teaching career at the University of Southern Mississippi, where she finished work on Satin Palms, a short story collection she had begun in graduate school. Impressed with the collection, Mary Robison blurbed that “These stories are so classy and smart and important I get dressed up to read them.” The volume was an award winner in 1981's Associated Writing Programs competition. During her first sabbatical, Inness-Brown completed a residency at Yaddo, an artists’ community located in Saratoga Springs, New York. There, she intended to write a novel, but instead began to work on a number of stories that would eventually be included in Here, her second short story collection.

In 1984, Inness-Brown guest-edited Vol. 12, No. 3 of the Mississippi Review alongside journal Editor Frederick Barthelme, who would later write a blurb for her second collection. Unlike Satin Palms, which featured a number of previously unpublished pieces, the majority of stories published in Here had already appeared in various literary journals and magazines, including The New Yorker, Boulevard, Glimmer Train, and Mississippi Review. Reviews of the collection were mixed, with Kirkus Reviews declaring it “Short fiction of an emerging polish, varyingly arresting.” Philip E. Baruth, writing for New England Review, had an equally ambivalent take on the collection, stating that although “three or four of the stories… are masterful examples of the genre… there is little sense of scope or risk.” Elaborating on this idea, Baruth later wrote that the short story categorization was incorrect, and suggested a number of alternative labels, including: “short-shorts, tales, prose poems, or memoir.”

Inness Brown’s debut novel, Burning Marguerite, received more generous coverage. Ann Harleman, writing for The New York Times, called it “vivid yet concise”, stating that the dual narratives of the book “offer many pleasures, remarkably distilled.” The novel is set mainly on the fictional Grain Island, though it departs for a time to New Orleans. The story follows two protagonists—Marguerite Deo, or Tante, and James Wright, the boy she raises—spanning the former’s nearly one hundred years of life. The book was hailed by Vermont Public Radio as a “tender, affecting tale,” while the San Francisco Chronicle wrote that “The novel is largely engaging and masterfully controlled… The uniqueness of the story and Inness-Brown’s clear, confident writing make this a stunning debut.”

Inness-Brown was an attendee of Fiction International/St. Lawrence University Writers’ Conference at Saranac Lake.

== Published work ==
Novels

- Burning Marguerite (Alfred A. Knopf, 2002)

Short Story Collections

- Here: Stories (Louisiana State University Press, March 1994)
- Satin Palms (Fiction International Press, 1981)

Short Stories

- "In the Soup" (Seven Days, July 2005)
- "Territory" (Cream City Review, Spring 1994)
- "The Chef's Bride" (Boulevard, Fall 1992)
- "The Surgeon" (Glimmer Train, Summer 1992)
- "Stephen" (Mississippi Review, Spring-Summer 1989)
- "Traveler" (North American Review, March 1989)
- "Horse Dreams" (The New Yorker, September 1985)
- "Release, Surrender" (Chelsea, Spring 1982)
- "Blue Pagoda" (AWP Newsletter, Fall 1981)

Essays

- "Twelve Days in October" (Madcap Review, July 2014)
- "June" (The Twelve Seasons of Vermont, 2005)
- "North Country Girls" (Living North Country: Essays on Landscape and Living in Northern New York, June 2001)
