= Leeds Pond =

Body of water in Plandome Manor, New York, United States

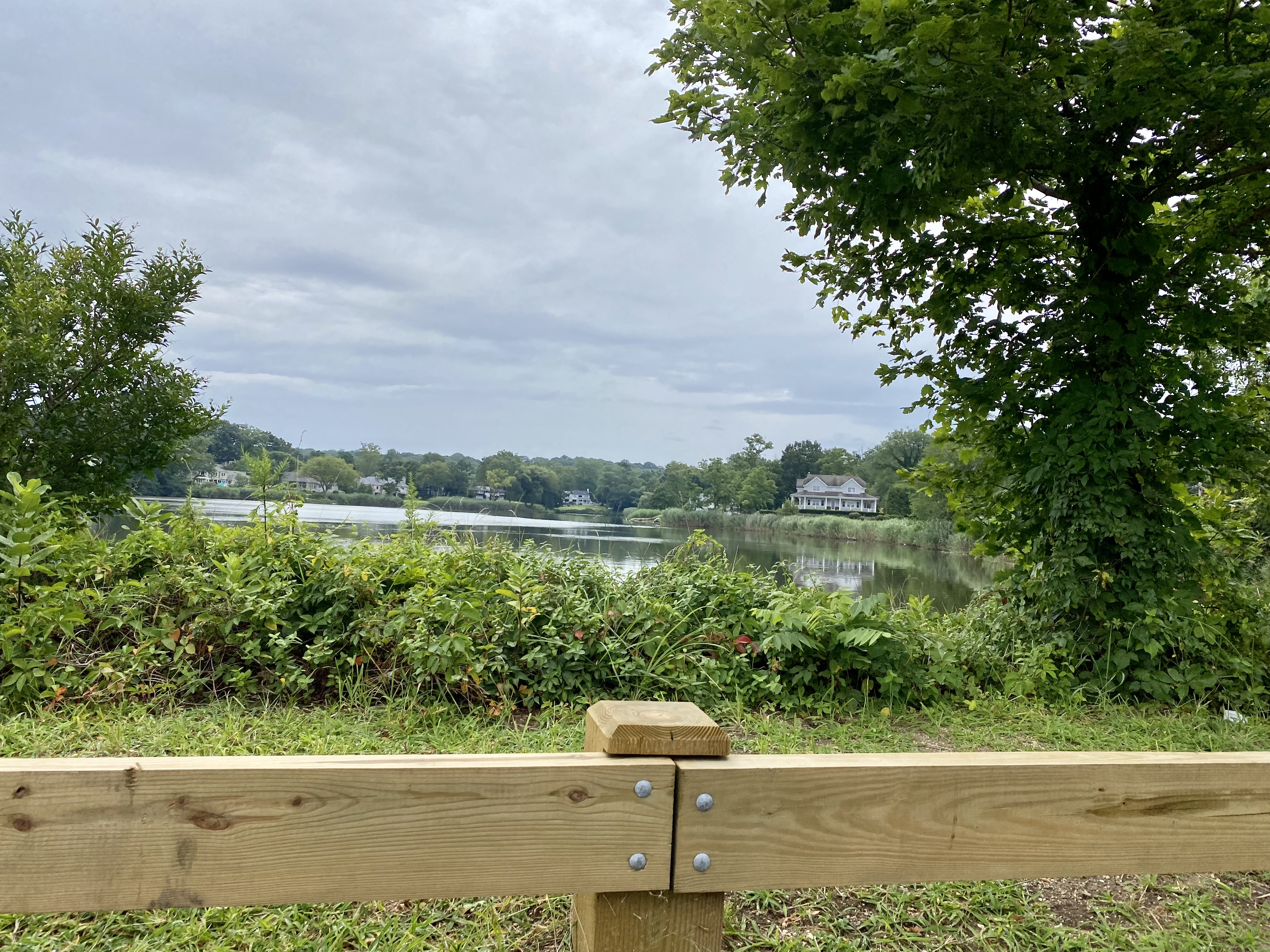
- Leeds Pond from North Plandome Road in August 2021

- Location of Leeds Pond in New York
- Location: Plandome Manor, New York
- Coordinates: 40°48′46.7″N 73°42′02.7″W
- Type: Pond
- Primary outflows: Manhasset Bay
- Catchment area: 2,275 acres (921 ha)
- Managing agency: Town of North Hempstead
- Surface area: 21.4 acres (8.7 ha)

Leeds Pond is a natural pond located adjacent to Manhasset Bay, within the Incorporated Village of Plandome Manor, in Nassau County, on Long Island, in New York, United States.

== Description ==
Leeds Pond is located in Plandome Manor, New York. It is adjacent to Manhasset Bay, and is roughly 21.4 acres (8.7 ha) in total size. It is owned by the Town of North Hempstead.

== Leeds Pond Preserve ==
Nassau County's 35-acre (14 ha) Leeds Pond Preserve is located adjacent to Leeds Pond. It contains wooded areas and the Science Museum of Long Island.

== Leeds Pond Sub-Watershed ==
The Leeds Pond Sub-Watershed is a sub-watershed of Manhasset Bay and the Manhasset Bay Watershed. The area of the watershed is approximately 2,275 acres (921 ha). The storm water which flows into Leeds Pond then has an overflow discharge into Manhasset Bay. Much of the area within watershed's boundaries is developed, and most stormwater in the watershed therefore enters the pond via. storm drains.

Communities either partially or wholly within the Leeds Pond Sub-Watershed include:

- Flower Hill
- Manhasset (including potions of Strathmore)
- Munsey Park
- Plandome
- Plandome Heights
- Plandome Manor
- Port Washington
- Roslyn Estates

== See also ==
- Lake Success (lake)
- Lake Ronkonkoma (lake)
