= Copley Pond Park =

Park in Munsey Park, Nassau County, New York, United States

- Copley Pond Park from Abbey Road in 2022
- Interactive map of Copley Pond Park
- Type: Public
- Location: Munsey Park, New York
- Coordinates: 40°47′50.1″N 73°40′38.3″W
- Area: 3 acres (1.2 ha)
- Established: 1940
- Owner: Incorporated Village of Munsey Park
- Operator: Incorporated Village of Munsey Park

Copley Pond Park (also known as Copley Park) is a three-acre (1.2 ha) public park located within the Incorporated Village of Munsey Park, in Nassau County, New York, United States.

== Description ==
Copley Pond Park features walking paths, seating areas, and a pond known as Copley Pond. It is owned and maintained by the Village of Munsey Park.

The park is named after the pond, which is in turn named for Copley Road at the southern end of the park – itself named for artist John Singleton Copley.

During the winter months, when Copley Pond freezes over, the park is frequently used for winter recreational activities, including ice skating or hockey on the pond.

== History ==
The land that would eventually become Copley Pond Park was originally developed by the Metropolitan Museum of Art in the late 1920s and early 1930s, as part of Munsey Park – a planned community the museum was developing on land bequeathed to it by publisher Frank Munsey. Located near the museum's short-lived Munsey Park Golf Club, the property on which Copley Pond Park sits was donated to the village in 1938, for future use as a municipal park and playground and to prevent business uses from being established on the land.

The park, itself, was built in 1940 as part of the New Deal, by Works Progress Administration workers, near the former golf course's 14th hole – for which the pond had previously served as the water hazard when the club was still operating. Benches from the 1939 New York World's Fair were installed at Copley Pond Park in these early years, having been donated for this purpose by a village resident.

Copley Pond Park underwent a renovation project between October 2013 and October 2014.

In the 2020s, plans were announced by the Village of Munsey Park to construct an early-childhood playground for local children at either Copley Pond Park or the village's nearby Waldmann Memorial Park.

== See also ==
- Flower Hill Village Park
- Gerry Park
- Manhasset Valley Park
- Plandome Pond Park
- Waldmann Memorial Park
