= Captain Kathy Mazza Memorial Park =

Park and 9/11 memorial in Nassau County, New York, United States

- Town of Oyster Bay Neighborhood Park Farmingdale F-9
- Interactive map of Captain Kathy Mazza Memorial Park
- Type: Public
- Location: South Farmingdale, New York
- Coordinates: 40°43′20″N 73°26′1″W
- Owner: Town of Oyster Bay
- Operator: Town of Oyster Bay Department of Parks

Captain Kathy Mazza Park (also known as Town of Oyster Bay Neighborhood Park Farmingdale F-9) is a park and 9/11 memorial located within South Farmingdale, in Nassau County, New York, United States, owned and operated by the Town of Oyster Bay.

== Description ==
The park – located at Poplar and Elm avenues in South Farmingdale – contains a playground, athletic facilities, and a memorial to the victims of the September 11, 2001 terrorist attacks.

In 2003, the park was renamed and formally dedicated in honor of Captain Kathy Mazza – a Port Authority of New York and New Jersey Police Department officer who was murdered in the destruction of the North Tower of the World Trade Center on September 11, 2001, while assisting in the evacuation efforts. Mazza, who grew up in Massapequa, was a Farmingdale resident at the time of her murder – and was the department's first female officer to be murdered in the line of duty in the attacks. The dedication ceremony occurred on September 21, 2003.

In 2011, a piece of steel from the World Trade Center was installed at the park, as a memorial to Mazza and the other victims of the 9/11 terrorist attacks.

== See also ==
- Manhasset Valley Park
- Captain Omer Neutra Memorial Park
- National September 11 Memorial and Museum
