= Webster Avenue Bridge =

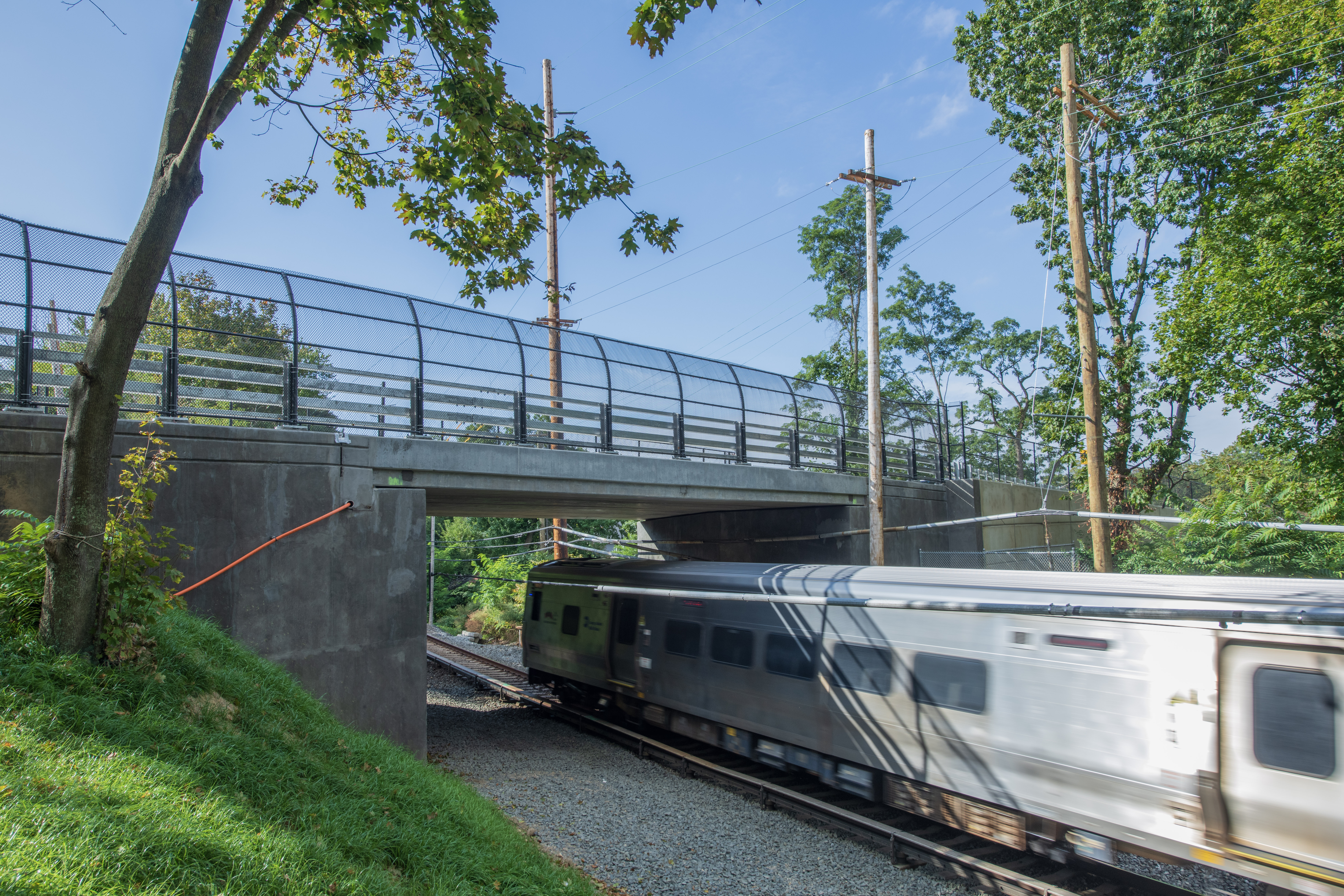
- The Webster Avenue Bridge in 2025
- Coordinates: 40°48′5.7″N 73°41′41.3″W
- Carries: Webster Avenue / Bridge Road
- Crosses: LIRR Port Washington Branch
- Locale: Villages of Plandome Heights and Flower Hill, NY
- Official name: Webster Avenue Highway Bridge
- Other name(s): Smith's Lane Bridge; D'Oench Bridge
- Owner: Long Island Rail Road
- Maintained by: Town of North Hempstead

Characteristics
- Design: Steel-stringer (original bridge); Concrete (new bridge)
- Total length: 78.7 feet (24.0 m)
- Width: 20.7 feet (6.3 m)
- Load limit: 3 tons
- Clearance above: 8 feet, 6 inches (2.6 m)
- No. of lanes: 2 (1 in each direction)

History
- Built: 1897 (original bridge)
- Opened: 1897 (original bridge); September 2025 (new bridge)
- Rebuilt: 2025
- Closed: January 6, 2025 (original bridge)

Statistics
- Daily traffic: 1,252 (2017)

Location
- Location of the Webster Avenue Bridge

The Webster Avenue Bridge (also known as the Smith's Lane Bridge and the D'Oench Bridge) is a road bridge over the Long Island Rail Road's Port Washington Branch between the Long Island, New York villages of Plandome Heights and Flower Hill.

In 2025, the original bridge – built in 1897 – was replaced with a new span built to modern design standards.

== Description ==
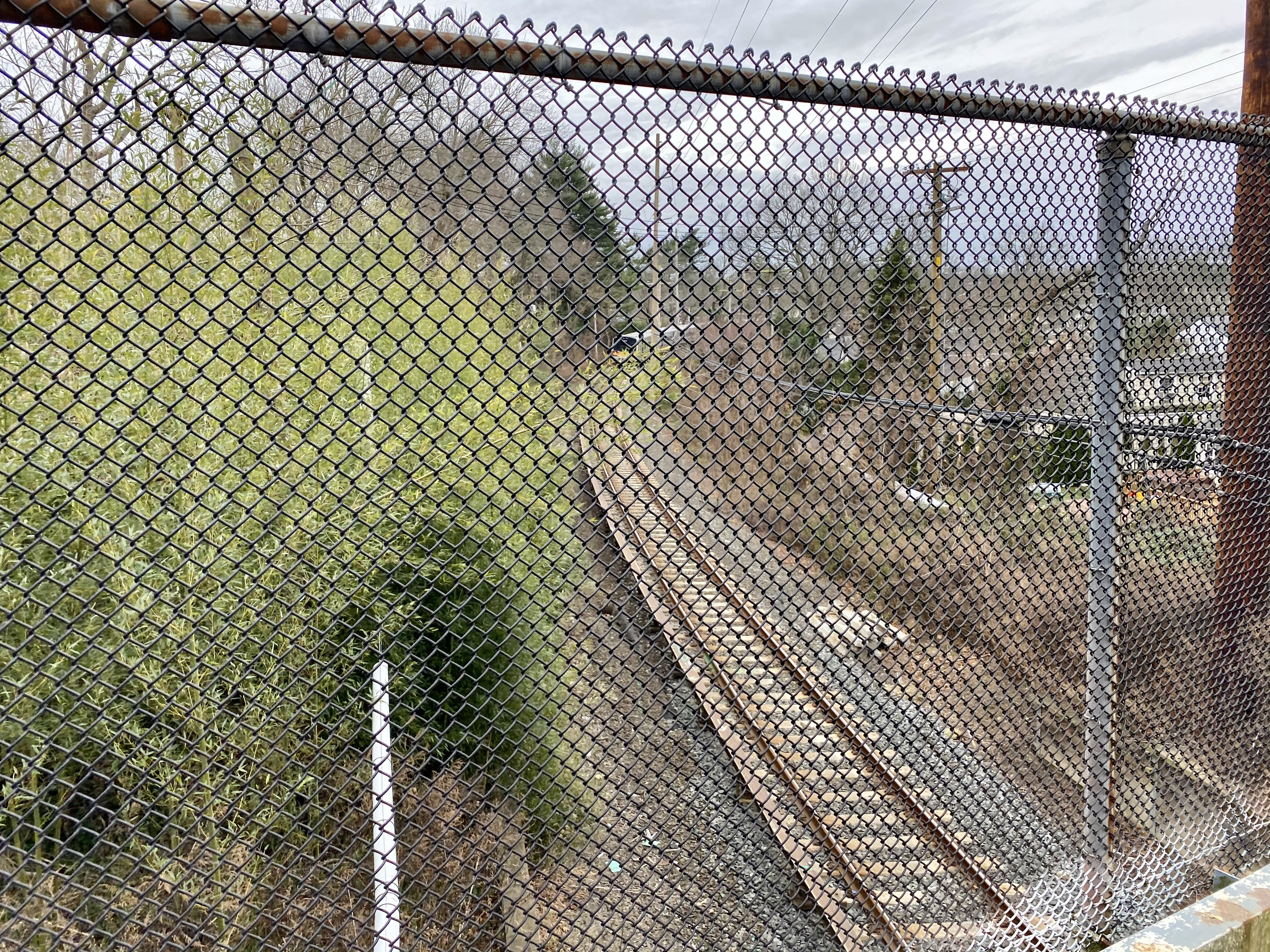
A Penn Station-bound train approaching the Manhasset station in 2020

The original Webster Avenue Bridge was built in 1897 using a steel-stringer design. Its replacement – built in 2025 – features a concrete design.

The bridge is 78.7 feet (24.0 m) in length, and is 20.7 feet (6.3 m) in width. The bridge carries two lanes of Webster Avenue / Bridge Road – along with a sidewalk on its north side – over the Port Washington Branch of the LIRR, from Brookwold Drive in Plandome Heights at its western end to Pinewood Road in Flower Hill at its eastern end.

The bridge's New York State bridge identification number is NY 2261210.

== History ==
=== Original bridge, 1897–2025 ===
The bridge was constructed in order to allow for traffic bound to and from Albert D'Oench's Sunset Hill estate – located on the east side of the tracks – to safely cross the Long Island Rail Road's Port Washington Branch, which was extended from Great Neck to Port Washington around the same time. The bridge was rehabilitated in 1953.

By 1979, the bridge's structural integrity severely weakened from the several decades of constant use, which was a major concern for many locals – including then-North Hempstead Town Supervisor Michael J. Tully Jr. (who was, at one point, a Flower Hill resident himself). The bridge was in such poor shape that it was closed by the Town of North Hempstead for repairs on April 20, 1979, following a safety warning from a state inspector that "90 percent" of the bridge was severely deteriorated; the bridge previously had to have its maximum weight limit reduced by the Town of North Hempstead, due to the structural deficiencies.

Tully requested that the bridge be repaired with federal aid as part of a government infrastructure program in 1979. This request for federal aid was denied – despite the fact that several other bridges on Long Island in similar shape were being rehabilitated with federal aid.

The bridge received more repairs in December 2015, and received a weight limit of 3 tons and a height clearance of 8 feet, 6 inches (2.6 meters), due to the bridge's poor structural integrity and overall deterioration. Height barriers were placed on both ends of the bridge to prevent taller vehicles from traversing the bridge, and weight limit signs were posted on both ends; school buses were rerouted to bypass the bridge.

Despite these repairs, the bridge's condition continues to deteriorate, much to the dismay of locals. As of 2019, the sidewalk is severely damaged after decades of being exposed to the elements, and the steel grate road deck is fractured in many places; welded steel plates are used to keep the roadway intact. In 2022, the bridge received a "poor" safety rating from New York, and was one of 11 on Long Island to be receive that rating that year.

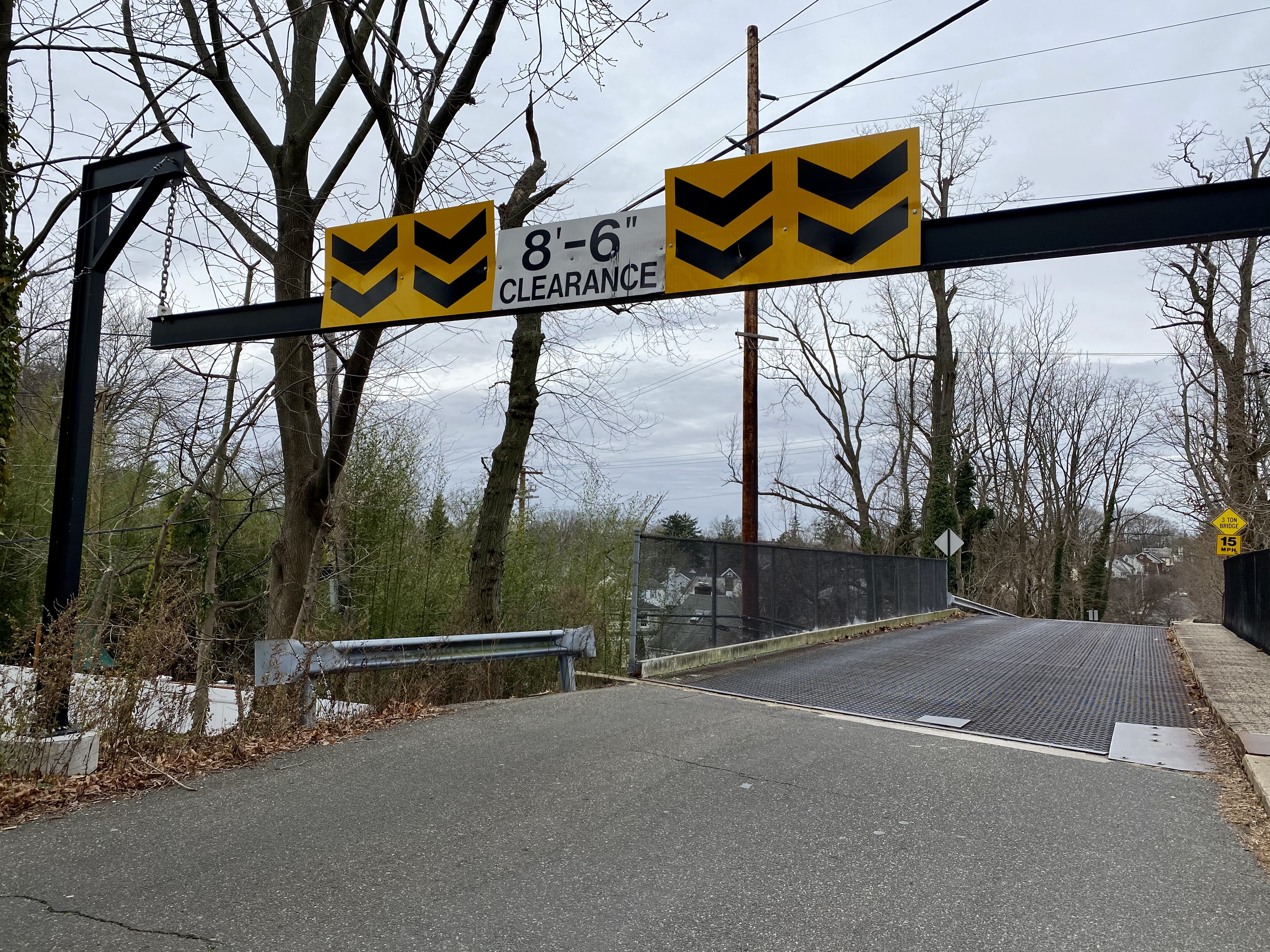
The original bridge's eight-foot, six-inch (2.6 m) height barrier on the Flower Hill end

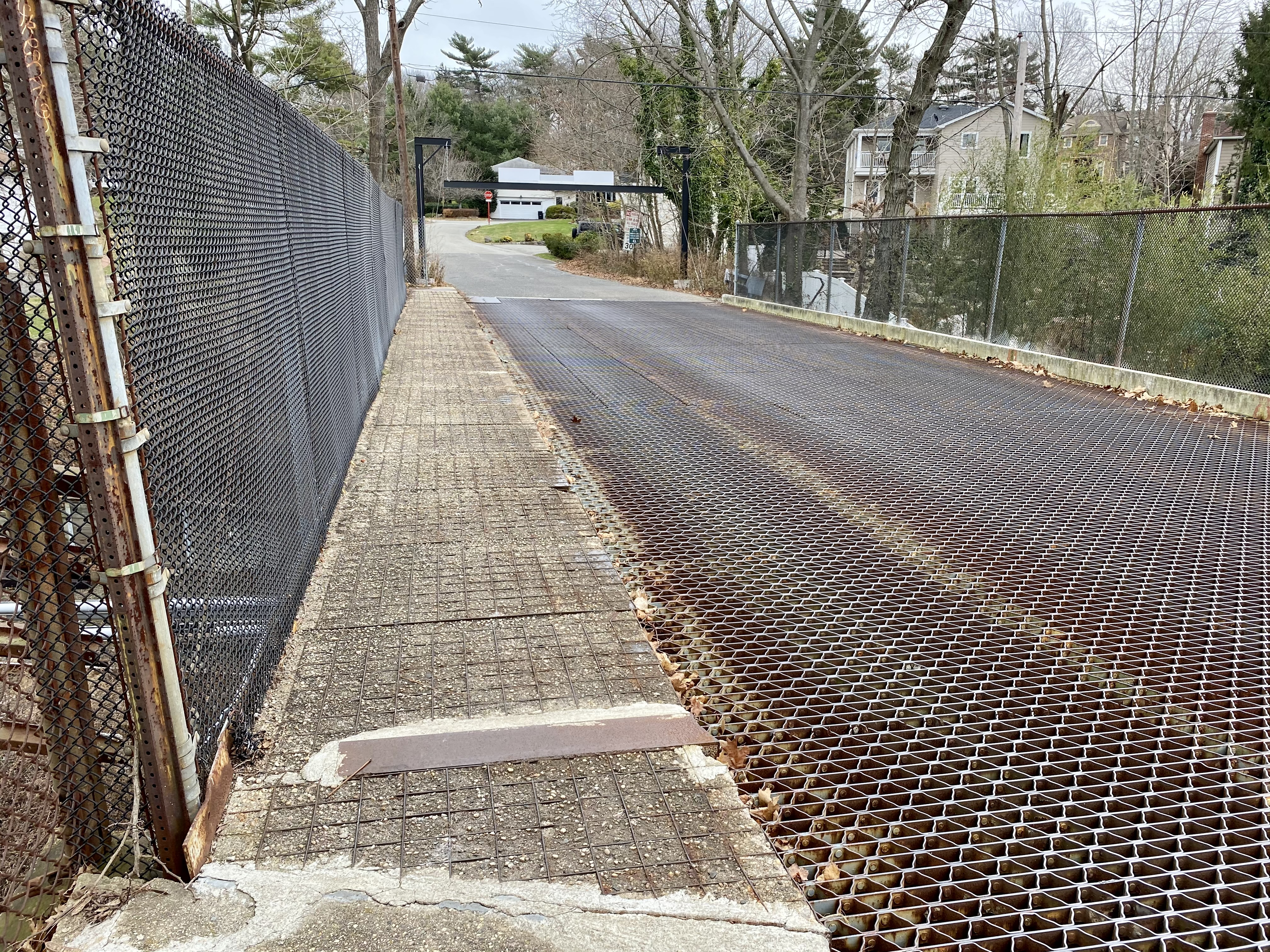
The original bridge's sidewalk, with its corroded rebar visible

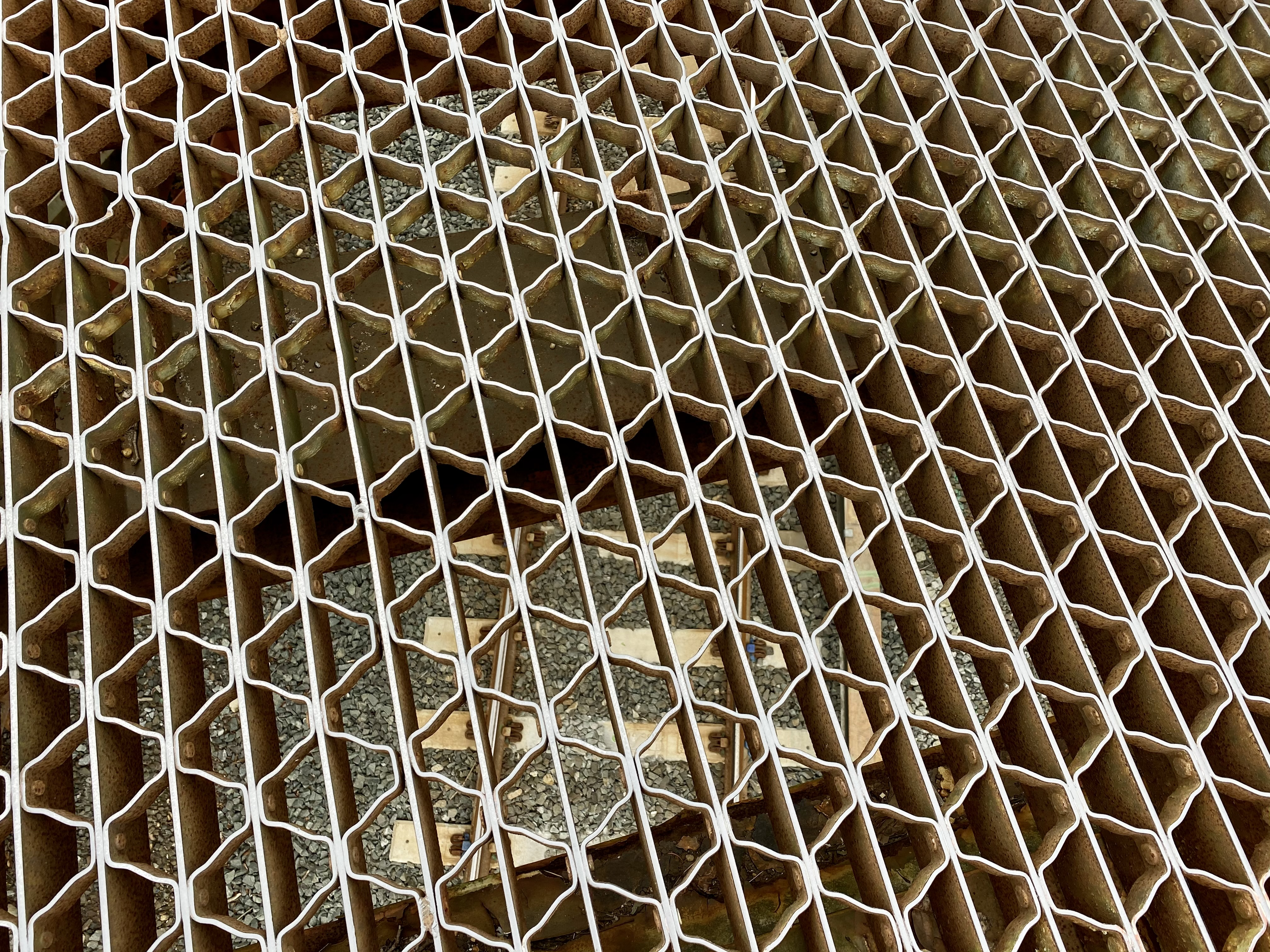
The original bridge's steel grate road deck

=== Replacement bridge, 2025–present ===
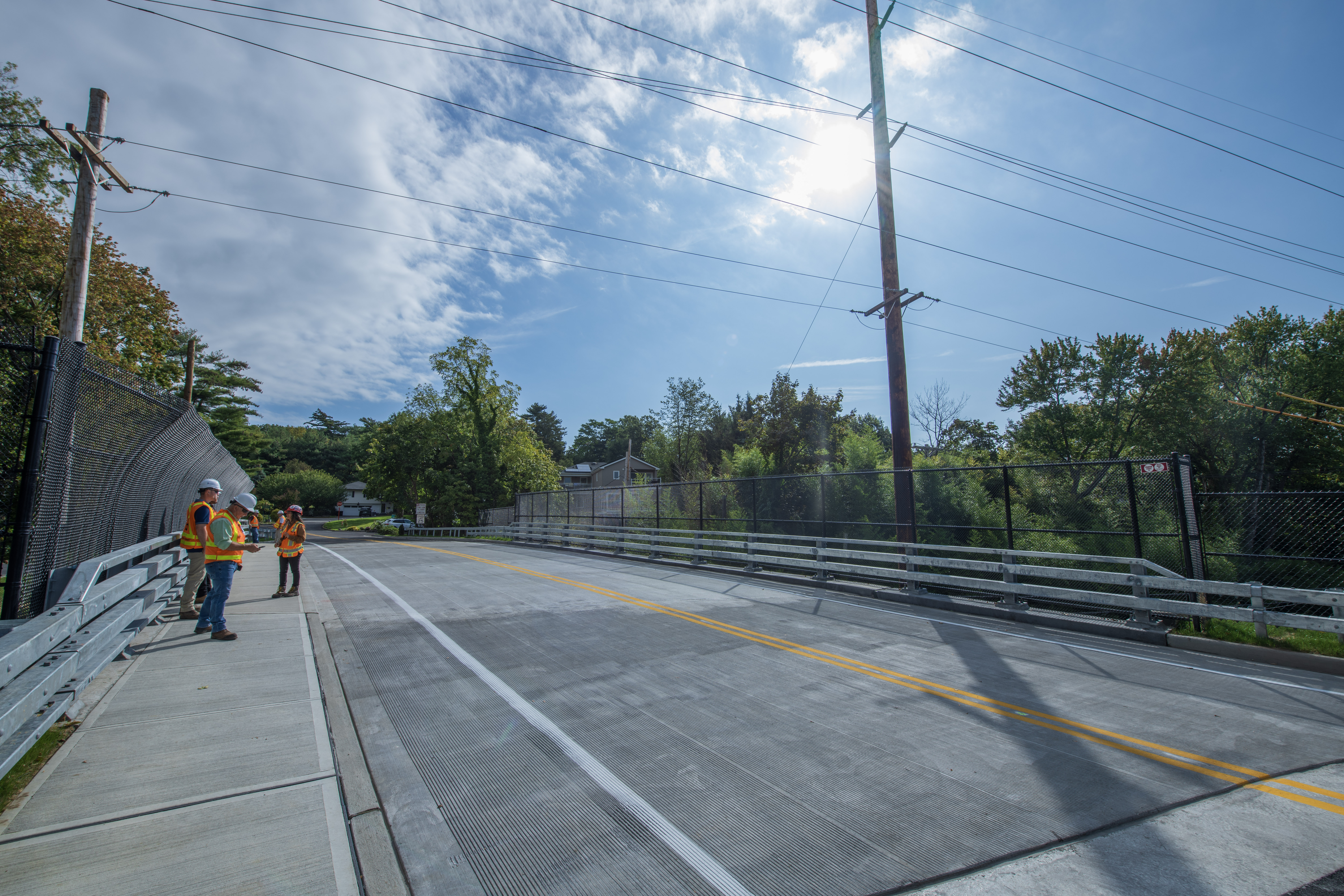
The new bridge in September 2025, shortly after opening

In the late 2010s, it was announced that the existing Webster Avenue Bridge would be replaced with a new, concrete span built to modern standards. This announcement was made in 2019, after major concerns were expressed from locals over the bridge's functional obsoleteness, increasing noise, state of disrepair, and structural weakness.

The preliminary design for a future replacement bridge had already been performed between 2017 and 2019, and the new bridge would to be erected as part of the MTA's 2020–2024 Capital Program.

The new Webster Avenue Bridge, at the time of the announcement, was anticipated to be completed by 2023; construction, however, was postponed.

In 2024, it was announced that the replacement project would commence on January 6, 2025; work was anticipated to be completed by the end of that year. The project would require the temporary closure of the bridge portions of Bridge Road and Webster Avenue, in order to facilitate the original bridge's demolition and the erection of its replacement.

On January 6, 2025, the original bridge indeed closed, to enable crews to demolish it and build the new span in its place; Plandome Pond Park – a Town of North Hempstead-owned located adjacent to the bridge at its west end in Plandome Heights – was used as a staging area for the construction work. The replacement span opened – and all construction work was completed – in September 2025; the project was completed four months ahead of schedule and $7.6 million under budget, at a cost of $16.5 million.

== See also ==
- History of the Long Island Rail Road
- Manhasset Viaduct – another bridge on the LIRR's Port Washington Branch, located slightly to the west.
