= Manhasset Woods Road =

Road on Long Island, New York

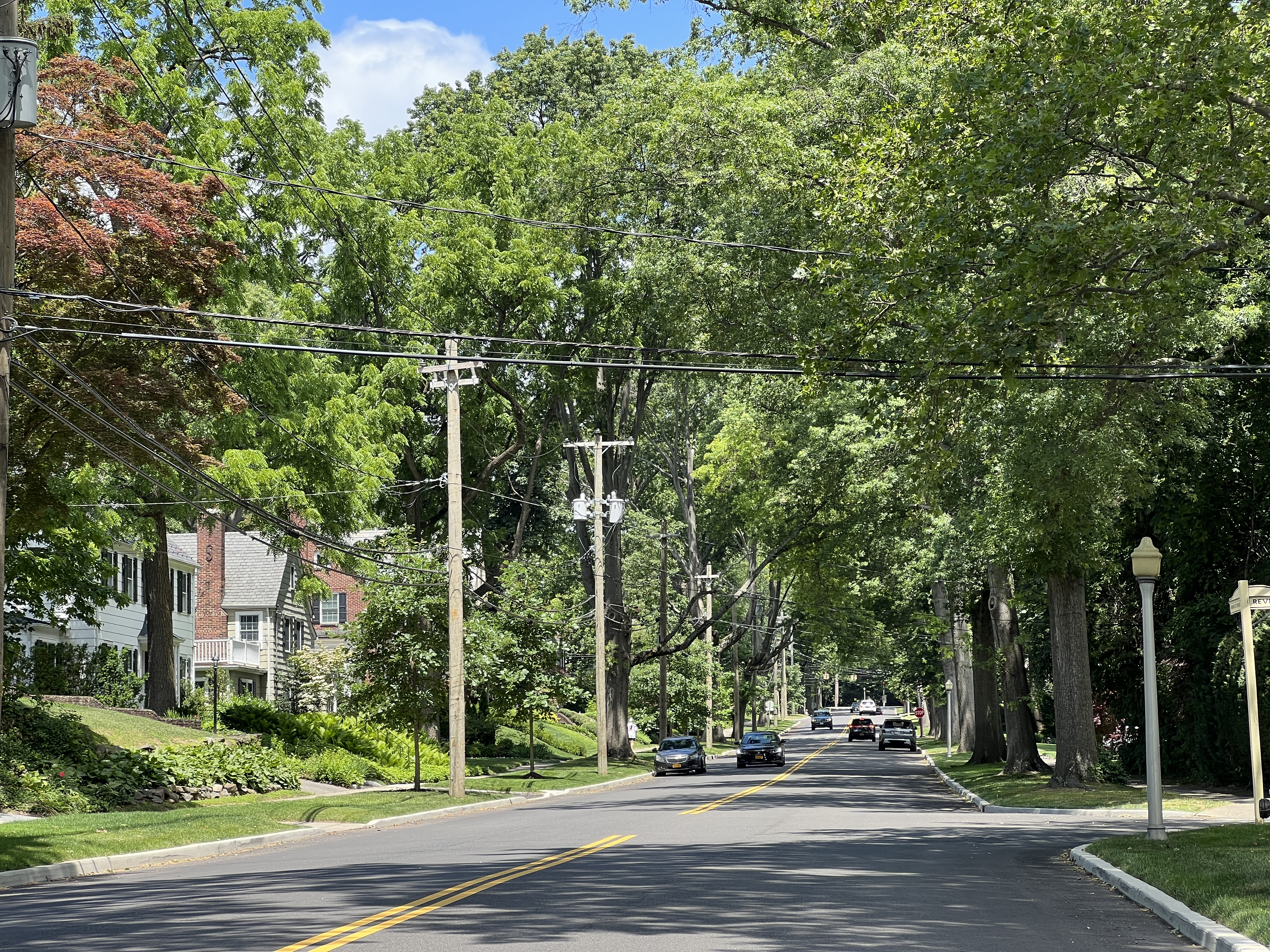
- Manhasset Woods Road in Munsey Park in 2023
- Type: Major Collector
- Owner: Village of Flower Hill; Village of Munsey Park
- Maintained by: Flower Hill DPW (Flower Hill section); Munsey Park DPW (Munsey Park section)
- Length: 1.16 mi (1.87 km)
- North end: Stonytown Road
- South end: Northern Boulevard (NY 25A)

Other
- Designer: T. B. Ackerson Company; Olmsted Brothers

Manhasset Woods Road, with the Flower Hill-maintained portion in red, and the Munsey Park-maintained portion in pink.

Manhasset Woods Road is a 1.16-mile (1.87 km) road located within the incorporated villages of Flower Hill and Munsey Park in the Town of North Hempstead, in Nassau County, on the North Shore of Long Island, in New York, United States.

It serves as a major north–south through street on the base of the Cow Neck Peninsula, between Northern Boulevard (NY 25A) to the south and Stonytown Road to the north.

== Route description ==
Manhasset Woods Road runs north–south through the incorporated villages of Flower Hill and Munsey Park. The road serves as a major north–south route through portions of both villages. The portions of Manhasset Woods Road within the Incorporated Village of Flower Hill are maintained by the Flower Hill Department of Public Works, and the portions within the Incorporated Village of Munsey Park are maintained by the Munsey Park Department of Public Works.

Manhasset Woods Road is classified as a major collector roadway by the New York State Department of Transportation and is eligible for federal aid.

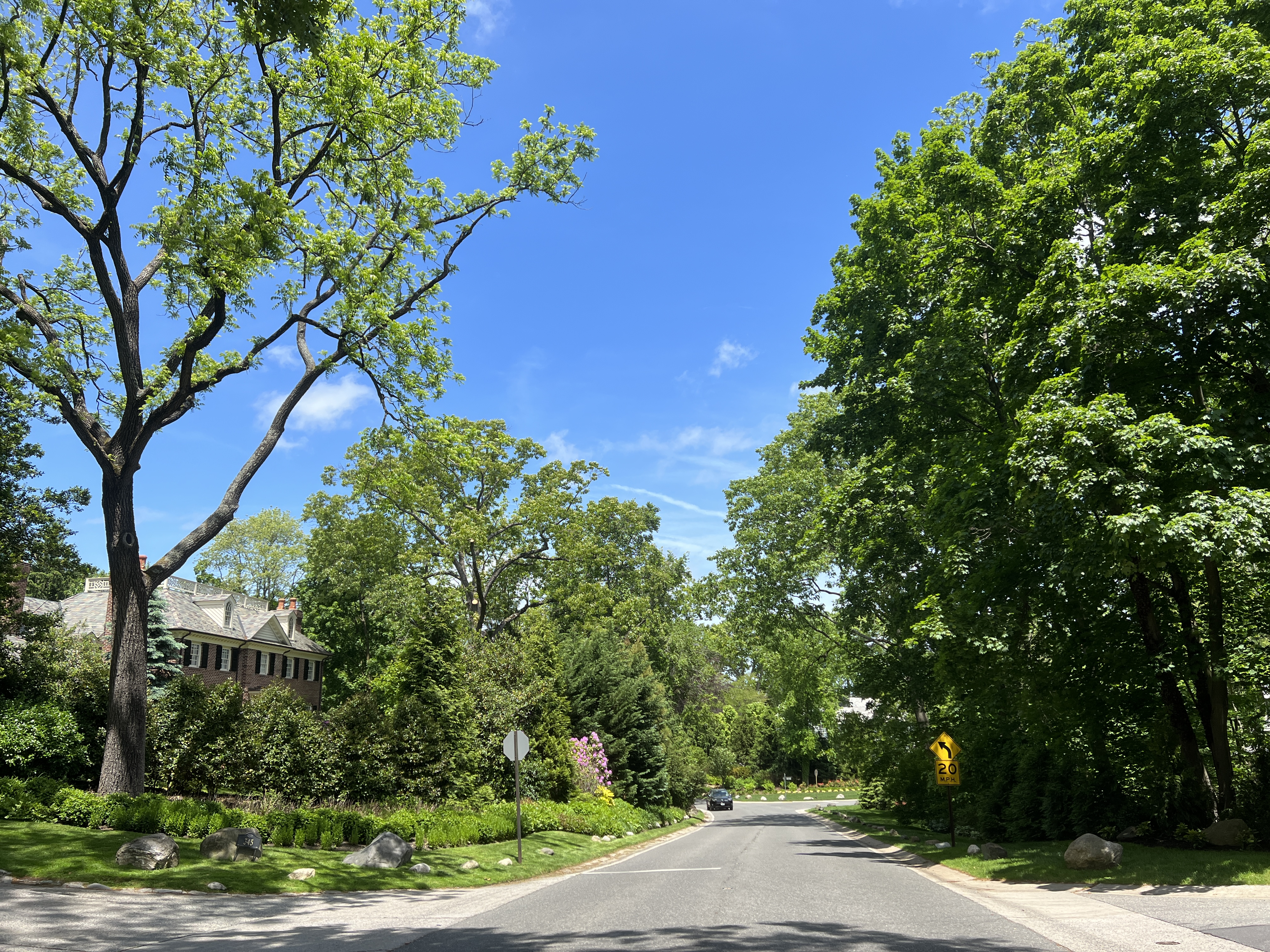
Manhasset Woods Road in Flower Hill in 2022

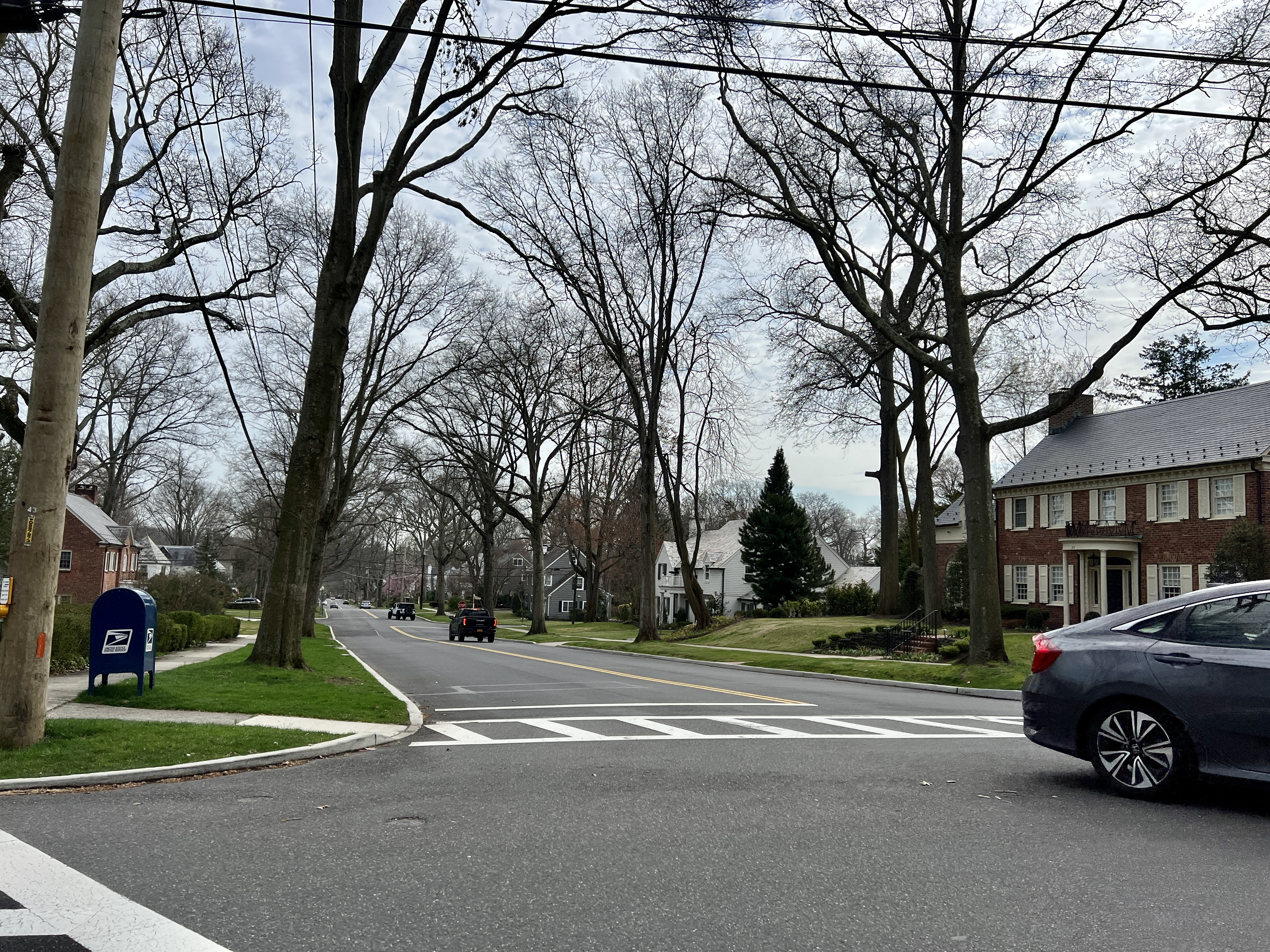
Manhasset Woods Road, as seen from Park Avenue, looking south

Manhasset Woods Road's northern terminus is at its intersection with Stonytown Road in the Village of Flower Hill. Continuing south, it ascends a hill, winding slightly and continuing towards the south, soon reaching Bonnie Heights Road. It then continues towards the south, soon reaching Walter Lane. The road then continues towards the south, ascending another hill and eventually reaching Elderfields Road. The road then veers towards the southwest and soon reaches Dogwood Lane. The road then continues southwest for a short distance before reaching and crossing the Flower Hill–Munsey Park border, entering the Village of Munsey Park. After entering Munsey Park, Manhasset Woods Road quickly veers south-southeast, soon reaching an intersection with Park Avenue, as well as a slip lane for southbound traffic heading for Park Avenue to go west. The triangular traffic island in between Manhasset Woods Road, the slip lane, and Park Avenue is a large park strip containing a small cell node disguised as a flagpole. Manhasset Woods Road then crosses Park Avenue, continuing south through the heart of Munsey Park, eventually reaching Hunt Lane. It then turns towards the southeast, continuing for one block to its southern terminus at Northern Boulevard (NY 25A).

Manhasset Woods Road becomes East Gate on the south side of the intersection, which continues south through Strathmore.

== History ==
The first portion of Manhasset Woods Road to be built was platted and constructed in the early 1920s, when Carlos W. Munson, the founding father of Flower Hill, had a portion of his large Flower Hill estate developed; this housing development and its street layout were developed by the T. B. Ackerson Company. This portion of the road extended from Stonytown Road to the north into the housing development to its south, connecting to Bonnie Heights Road and eventually extending south to the Flower Hill–Munsey Park border. Then, in the late 1920s, the Metropolitan Museum of Art had been willed a large amount of land by publisher Frank Munsey, and the museum had the portion of the property north of Northern Boulevard developed as Munsey Park – a large, planned community which would take advantage of the nearby Manhasset station on the Long Island Rail Road. This portion of Manhasset Woods Road between the Flower Hill–Munsey Park border and Northern Boulevard was platted and constructed in the late 1920s, with the landscaping designed by the Olmsted Brothers.

In the 1950s, there was a proposal for a bypass of Northern Boulevard in Manhasset, starting at East Shore Road and continuing east, ending at Manhasset Woods Road; the proposed highway would have crossed Whitney Pond and Shelter Rock Road. The proposed highway would have consisted of a four or six lanes and would bypass the western half of Manhasset's Miracle Mile; the project, had it been approved, would have cost approximately $5,000,000-$8,000,000 (1956 USD). The proposal met stiff opposition from the community and was ultimately scrapped by New York lawmakers.

In the mid-to-late 1990s, the section of Manhasset Woods Road between Bonnie Heights Road and Stonytown Road in Flower Hill was straightened. The project was undertaken in order to eliminate a dangerous curve in the road.

== Major intersections ==
The entire route is within Nassau County.

| Location | mi | km | Destinations | Notes |
|---|---|---|---|---|
| Flower Hill | 0.00 | 0.00 | Stonytown Road | Northern terminus. |
| Flower Hill | 0.20 | 0.32 | Bonnie Heights Road | |
| Flower Hill | 0.58 | 0.93 | Elderfields Road | |
| Flower Hill | 0.63 | 1.01 | Dogwood Lane | |
| Flower Hill–Munsey Park line | 0.69 0.47 | 1.11 0.76 | Bend in roadway | Ownership changes; change in mileage measurements. |
| Munsey Park | 0.44 | 0.71 | Slip ramp | Access to westbound Park Avenue. |
| Munsey Park | 0.41 | 0.66 | Park Avenue | |
| Munsey Park | 0.07 | 0.11 | Hunt Lane | Access to Munsey Park Elementary School, via Hunt Lane. |
| Munsey Park–Manhasset line | 0.00 | 0.00 | NY 25A (Northern Boulevard) – New York City, Calverton | Southern terminus; roadway becomes East Gate and travels south through Strathmore. At-grade intersection. |
1.000 mi = 1.609 km; 1.000 km = 0.621 mi

== Notable residents ==
- Harry Goz – Actor; lived on Manhasset Woods Road in Munsey Park.
- Christopher Mullin – Basketball player and coach; lived on Manhasset Woods Road in Flower Hill.
- John W. Walter – Businessman, engineer, and politician; lived at 511 Manhasset Woods Road in Flower Hill. Walter was the first cousin of President Donald J. Trump.

== See also ==
- Plandome Road
