= Park Avenue (Manhasset, New York) =

Road in Nassau County, New York

- Maintained by: Town of North Hempstead (Manhasset portion), Village of Munsey Park (Munsey Park portion)
- East end: Plandome Road
- West end: Dead-end just southeast of Park Avenue North

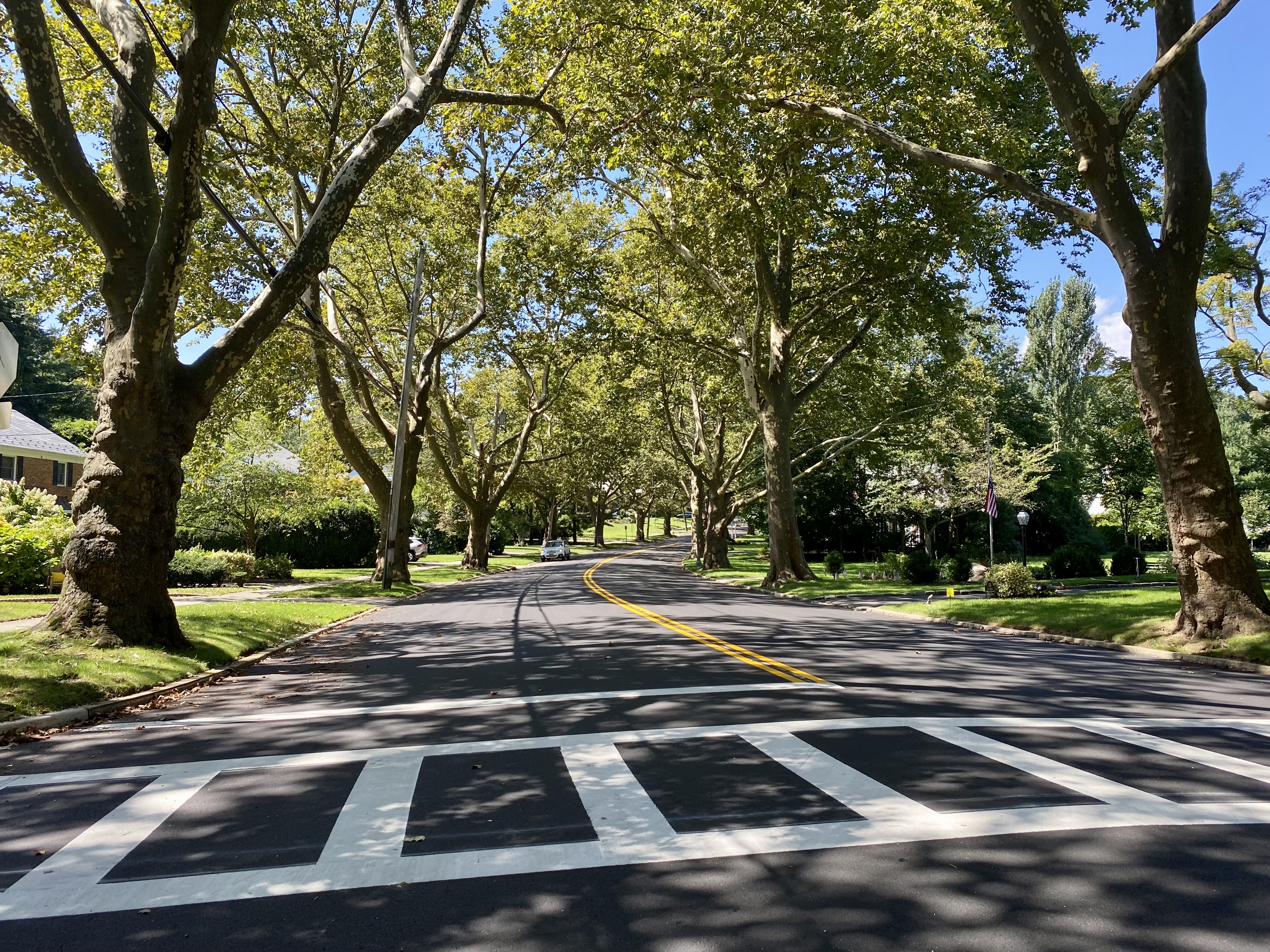
Park Avenue in Munsey Park, looking west on September 6, 2021

Park Avenue is a road in Manhasset and Munsey Park in the Town of North Hempstead, in Nassau County, on Long Island, in New York, United States. It serves as a through street between Plandome Road and Port Washington Boulevard (NY 101).

== Description ==
Park Avenue runs east-west through the hamlet of Manhasset and the Village of Munsey Park; it serves as the main west-east route through the Manhasset Park subdivision of Manhasset and of the Village of Munsey Park. Its western terminus is at Plandome Road across from the Manhasset Long Island Rail Road station, and its eastern terminus is at a dead-end towards the southeastern corner of Munsey Park.

The first section to be built was the portion in the Manhasset Park subdivision of the hamlet of Manhasset, which was platted out circa 1912. During this time, Park Avenue ended at Locust Place (now Munsey Place).

When the Metropolitan Museum of Art had Munsey Park developed in the 1920s, Park Avenue was extended through the new development to Northern Boulevard (NY 25A) and Port Washington Boulevard (NY 101) at the southeastern corner of the village. It was planned to be one of the only through streets within the village so as to keep the character of the new community residential. The original landscaping along Park Avenue through Munsey Park, which was (and still is) tree-lined, was designed by the Olmsted Brothers.

When the short-lived Munsey Park Golf Club was operating in the easternmost parts of Munsey Park between 1932 and 1937, Park Avenue traversed it.

The portion of Park Avenue located within the unincorporated hamlet of Manhasset is owned and maintained by the Town of North Hempstead. The part of the road located within the Incorporated Village of Munsey Park is owned and maintained by Munsey Park.

=== Former segments ===
Originally, Park Avenue branched at its southeast end, with one branch leading to Port Washington Boulevard (NY 101) and the other leading to Northern Boulevard (NY 25A). These connections were eventually severed, causing the road to dead-end just southeast of Park Avenue North; the area was redeveloped as a shopping center.

== Park Avenue North ==
Park Avenue North
- Park Avenue
- South/west end: Park Avenue
- North/east end: Port Washington Boulevard

Park Avenue North is a northeastern spur of Park Avenue, running between Park Avenue and Port Washington Boulevard (NY 101) to the northeast. It is often considered to be part of Park Avenue, as apparent on official Maps.

Park Avenue North is maintained by the Village of Munsey Park.

== See also ==
- Manhasset Woods Road
- Waldmann Memorial Park
