= Plandome Pond Park =

Park in Plandome Heights, New York, United States

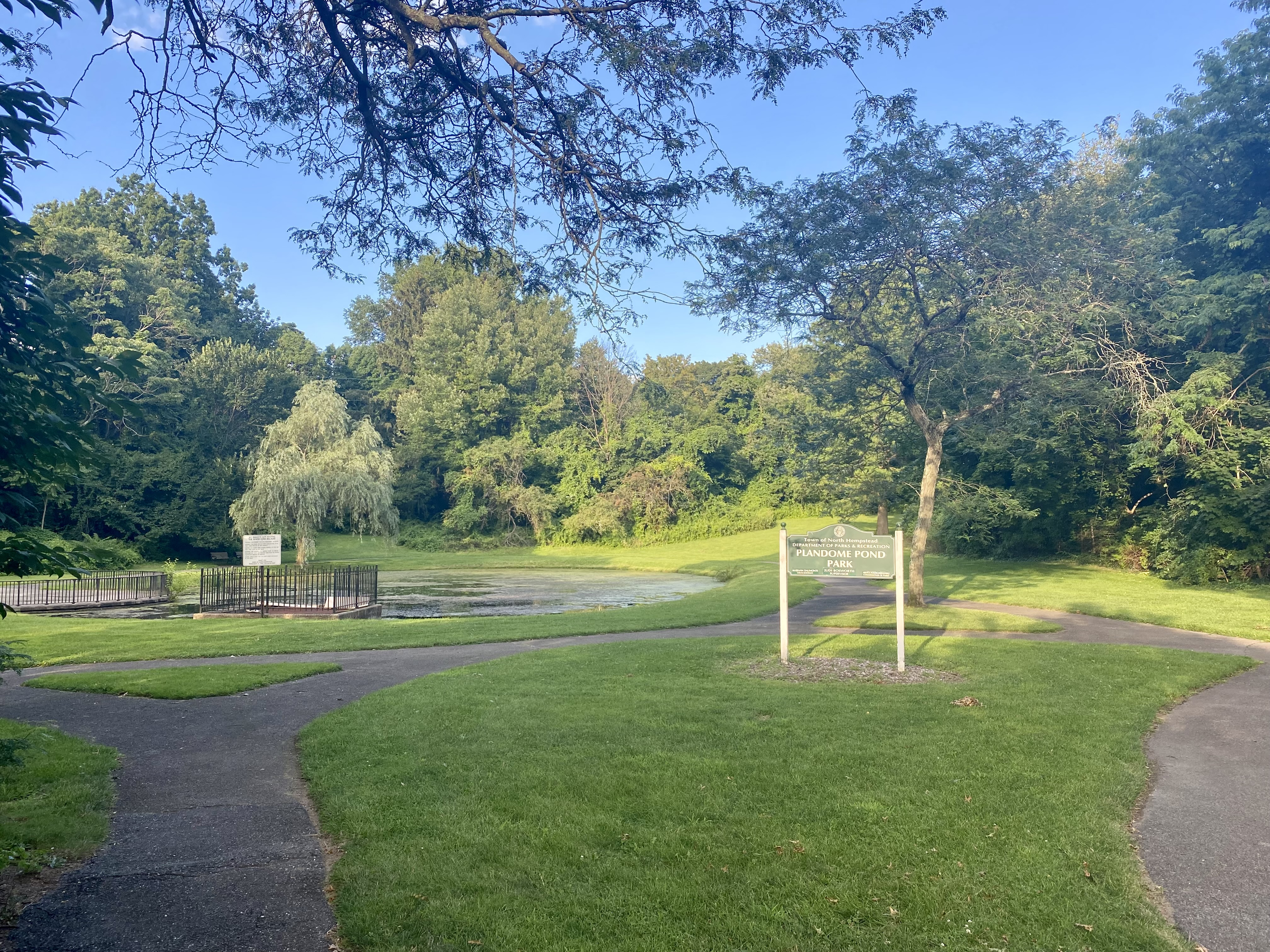
- Plandome Pond Park in 2021
- Interactive map of Plandome Pond Park
- Type: Public
- Location: Plandome Heights, New York, United States
- Coordinates: 40°48′08″N 73°41′44″W
- Opened: Late 1950s
- Owner: Town of North Hempstead
- Paths: Yes
- Website: Town of North Hempstead – Plandome Pond Park

Plandome Pond Park, also known as Plandome Park and historically as Bourndale Park, is a park in the Incorporated Village of Plandome Heights in Nassau County on Long Island in New York, United States. It is located within – and is owned and operated by – the Town of North Hempstead.

== Description ==
Plandome Pond Park is located in the Chester Hill section of the Village of Plandome Heights, bordered by Bourndale Road at its west end and the Long Island Rail Road's Port Washington Branch at its east end. It features walking paths, sitting areas, and a pond.

== History ==
The park was created in the late 1950s, following the purchase of land for a water recharge basin. The site – which is part of the area known as Chester Hill – was to be developed with single-family homes. This changed when Nassau County purchased the land for the recharge basin. Residents of the Chester Hill section were concerned about the recharge basin, and were successful in having Nassau County create the park, which covered – and otherwise concealed – the piping needed for their recharge basin on the property.

The park received upgrades in the 2010s. These upgrades included the dredging of the pond to make it deeper.

In 2025, Plandome Pond Park was used as a staging area for the construction work on the Metropolitan Transportation Authority's Webster Avenue Bridge Replacement Project. This project saw the Webster Avenue Bridge – located adjacent to the park and carrying Bridge Road and Webster Avenue over the Long Island Rail Road's Port Washington Branch, between Bourndale Road in Plandome Heights and Pinewood Road in Flower Hill – was replaced with a new span built to modern design standards; the original bridge, which had been built over a century prior, was structurally obsolete and in a state of disrepair.

On the evening of October 1, 2026, members of the Manhasset High School cross country team discovered human skeletal remains in a wooded area of the park east of the pond, forcing it to close overnight at the behest of a Nassau Police investigation. In a news conference the following day, Commissioner Patrick Ryder stated that they believe no foul play was involved, and that the remains are connected to a missing persons case involving an elderly woman from December 2025, though no definitive identifications had been made at that time.

== See also ==
- Manhasset Valley Park – Another park in Manhasset operated by the Town of North Hempstead.
- Copley Pond Park – Another, similar park in nearby Munsey Park.
