= Munsey Park, New York =

- Village
- Incorporated Village of Munsey Park
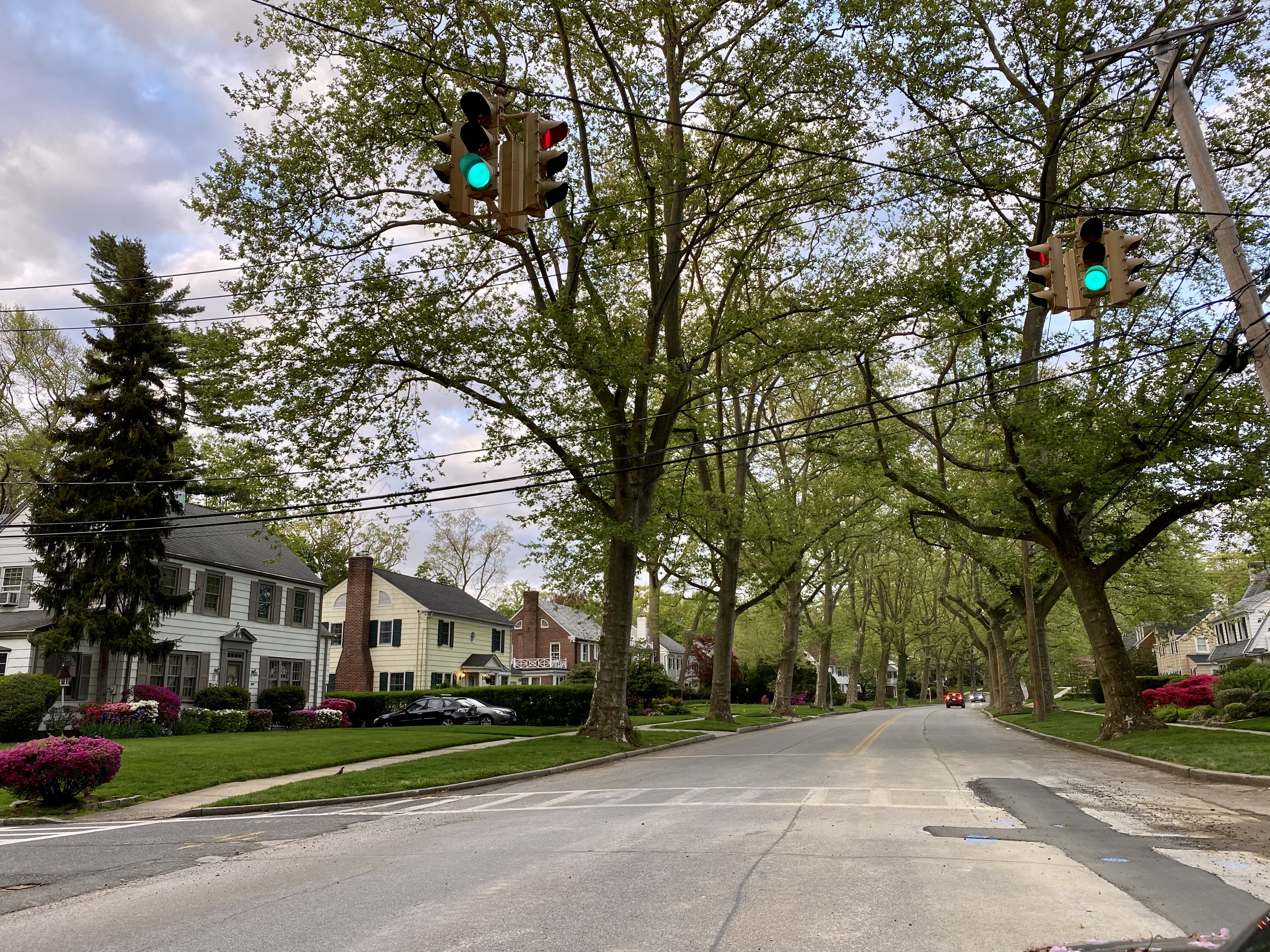
- Park Avenue in Munsey Park, looking east
- Nicknames: "Park"; "The Park"; "VMP"
- Location in Nassau County and the state of New York

- Location on Long Island Location within the state of New York
- Coordinates: 40°47′59″N 73°40′53″W
- Country: United States
- State: New York
- County: Nassau
- Town: North Hempstead
- Incorporated: February 16, 1930
- Founder: Metropolitan Museum of Art
- Named for: Frank A. Munsey

Government
  - Mayor: Lawrence Ceriello
  - Deputy Mayor: Patty Miller

Area
  - Total: 0.52 sq mi (1.34 km^{2})
  - Land: 0.52 sq mi (1.34 km^{2})
  - Water: 0 sq mi (0.00 km^{2})
- Elevation: 157 ft (48 m)

Population (2020)
  - Total: 2,809
  - Density: 5,442.5/sq mi (2,101.37/km^{2})
- Demonym(s): Munsey Parker; Manhassetonian
- Time zone: UTC−5 (Eastern (EST))
  - Summer (DST): UTC−4 (EDT)
- ZIP Code: 11030 (Manhasset)
- Area codes: 516, 363
- FIPS code: 36-49231
- GNIS feature ID: 0958164
- Website: www.munseypark.gov

Munsey Park is a village in Nassau County, on the North Shore of Long Island, in New York, United States. It is considered part of the Greater Manhasset area, which is anchored by Manhasset. The population was 2,809 at the time of the 2020 census.

The Incorporated Village of Munsey Park is located entirely within the Town of North Hempstead, and has been recognized as a Tree City USA since 1983.

== History ==
=== Before Munsey Park (pre-colonization – 1925) ===
The land that Munsey Park now comprises was originally inhabited by the Matinecock Native Americans. In the 17th century, Dutch and English colonists began to explore and settle the area; many large farms were established on Cow Neck – the bottom of which includes Munsey Park – by these European settlers.

In the late 1890s, what is now the Port Washington Branch of the Long Island Rail Road was extended east from the Great Neck station to a new terminal in Port Washington, with a new station in Manhasset – located at Plandome Road – being constructed between them. The extension of the LIRR and the opening of the Manhasset station spurred significant development throughout the Manhasset area, at a time when many wealthy individuals and their families had started to purchase large tracts of land within the Manhasset area and across the North Shore of Long Island. Among these individuals was publisher Frank Andrew Munsey (1854–1925), who had purchased all of the land now occupied by Munsey Park – along with significant acreage directly across Northern Boulevard (NY 25A) therefrom, to its south.

=== Development and early years (1925–1929) ===
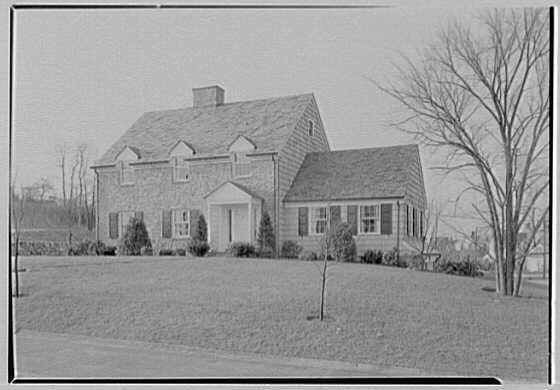
A home in Munsey Park in 1939

Munsey Park was first developed in the 1920s, following Frank Munsey's death in 1925. Having no family to whom he could pass down his sprawling estate, Munsey bequeathed his land to the Metropolitan Museum of Art. Upon assuming ownership of the land, the Metropolitan Museum sold the portion of the estate south of Northern Boulevard (NY 25A); that area would eventually become part of Strathmore. Meanwhile, the museum retained ownership to the portion of Munsey's estate on the north side of Northern Boulevard, and – with help from the Hassett Realty Company – decided to develop that land into a "model, restricted community" and commuter town, under the leadership of museum president Robert W. DeForest. This planned community was designed to take advantage of the Long Island Rail Road's Manhasset station, located just west of the development.

The new community was developed with Colonial-style houses and streets named for American artists. Much of the original landscaping in the planned community was designed by the Olmsted Brothers, while architect Frederick Lee Ackerman designed many of the houses and other buildings therein.

In 1928, Munsey Park's first model home opened. Like many of the other earliest homes to be constructed in the planned community, it was built in Section "A" – located at the western end of the development; Section "A" was the first section of Munsey Park to be constructed.

The name of the community was originally to be Munsey Meadows – but this name was changed to Munsey Park; it is named in honor of Frank Munsey.

=== Push for incorporation (1929 – 1930) ===
On April 8, 1929, the short-lived Manhasset Sewer District was established. This sewer district had been created with the goal of constructing and maintaining a network of sanitary sewers throughout the Greater Manhasset area – including Munsey Park. Munsey Park's residents were largely opposed to the plan, and wished not to have sewers be installed in their neighborhood. Accordingly, the sewering proposals led to a significant amount of concern amongst many of the locals – and it spurred Munsey Parkers to consider incorporating the area as a village, so to have more control over the execution of such projects therein and to otherwise directly govern their community through exercise municipal home rule.

On January 27, 1930, Munsey Park residents voted 155-to-3 in favor of incorporating their community as the Incorporated Village of Munsey Park, which would have its own municipal government and zoning powers; the incorporation would be made official 20 days after the vote.

=== Village of Munsey Park (1930 – present) ===
Following the vote to incorporate Munsey Park as a village, the Village of Munsey Park held its first village election on March 1, 1930; this election saw residents of Munsey Park vote for the village's first elected officials. Herman Block was elected to serve as the village's first Mayor.

One of the first decisions made by the village's elected officials was to leave the Manhasset Sewer District – much to the delight of many village residents – in addition to a decision to leave the Manhasset Parking District; the Manhasset Sewer District ultimately dissolved in 1932.

In 1931, the Munsey Park Shopping Center – also designed by Frederick Ackerman – opened at the northwestern corner of Northern Boulevard and Manhasset Woods Road; it was designed to conform to the architecture of the homes within the village. The following year, on January 12, 1932, several of the village's female residents – wishing to establish a local philanthropic civic organization – created the Munsey Park Women's Club.

On May 30, 1932 – four months after the Munsey Park Women's Club was created, the Metropolitan Museum of Art opened the 18-hole golf course at the eastern end of the village, known as the Munsey Park Golf Club; its clubhouse was also designed by Ackerman. Operated by the Metropolitan Museum, the golf club closed on March 1, 1937, as a result of poor revenue and profits, in addition to rising deficits. The former club's land was subsequently redeveloped as additional housing – in addition to a business area at the former club's clubhouse, which was already zoned for commercial use. Much of the residential development on the site of the former golf course was developed by the Callan Brothers; Levitt & Sons had also attempted, unsuccessfully, to develop the remaining portions of the former golf course in the 1940s.

In the late 1930s, the Manhasset Union Free School District built the Munsey Park Elementary School within the village. It was constructed in order to address overcrowding issues in the district's existing schools caused by the large development boom in the Manhasset area and the resulting influx of residents – including in Munsey Park.

In late 1941, during the first week of the United States' involvement in World War II, the Metropolitan Museum of Art deeded the 3.5-acre (1.4 ha) Polliwog Park to Munsey Park. This park would be dedicated and renamed by the village in 1943, as Waldmann Memorial Park – in honor Munsey Park resident Lt. George Raymond Waldmann, who was killed fighting for the United States in World War II and the first village resident to die while fighting in the war.

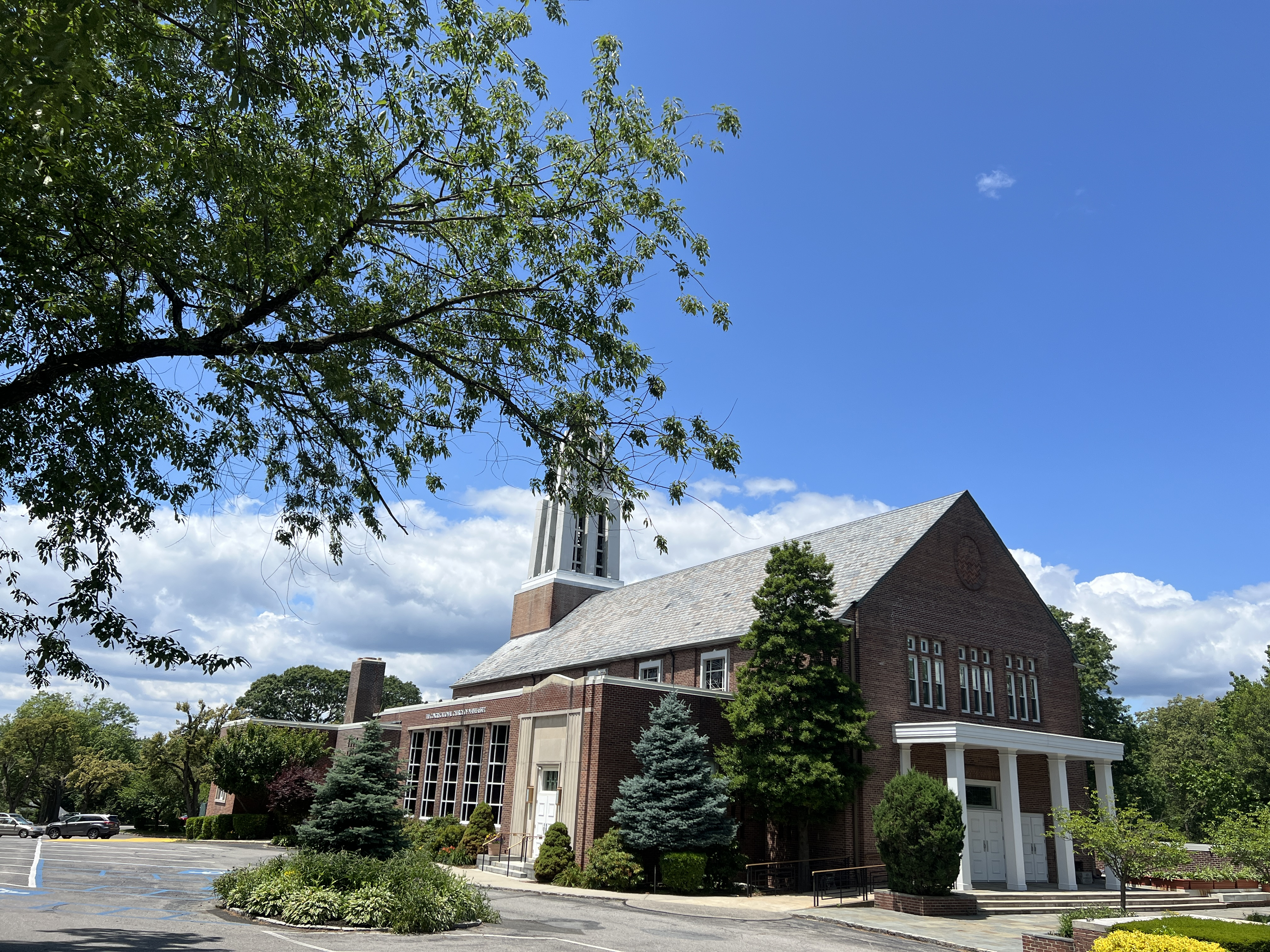
The Congregational Church of Manhasset in 2023

In May 1942, the Congregational Church of Manhasset purchased 2.5 acres (1.0 ha) of land in Munsey Park, along the north side of Northern Boulevard. On this land, it would erect a large church building. The church's groundbreaking occurred on May 12, 1948, and it was completed the next year, in 1949. The Church of Our Savior, Lutheran, broke ground directly across Copley Road that same year; it was completed in 1950.

In 1956, New York City-based department store Bonwit Teller announced that it would erect a department store in Munsey Park, in the business area which had formerly been part of the Munsey Park Golf Club. The building was designed by Lanthrop Douglass and Charles Anderson, and the store opened in 1957.

On December 8, 1974, Munsey Park Village Hall opened. Located at 1777 Northern Boulevard at the southern edge of the village, the structure was built to conform to the style of residential homes in Munsey Park, and was erected on land which the village had purchased back in 1950.

In 1983, Munsey Park was designated as a Tree City USA by the National Arbor Day Foundation for the first time.

In the late 1980s and early 1990s, developers planned turning the Munsey Park Plaza shopping center at the village's southeast corner into a luxury shopping mall; this shopping center included Munsey Park's Bonwit Teller branch, which opened in 1957 and closed in 1990. The proposed shopping mall on the site would have featured two floors, multiple exterior designs, and a parking garage with three levels. The proposal, which was first made in 1988, was rejected by the village. After Munsey Park's rejection of the plans, the developers filed a lawsuit against the village. Ultimately, the lawsuit was unsuccessful, and the mall was never built; the property was eventually purchased in 1992 by TH Associates, which rehabilitated it and secured a new tenant for the former Bonwit Teller space.

In 2008, the Village of Munsey Park was ranked as the 13th (tied) Wealthiest Town in America by BusinessWeek.

== Geography ==
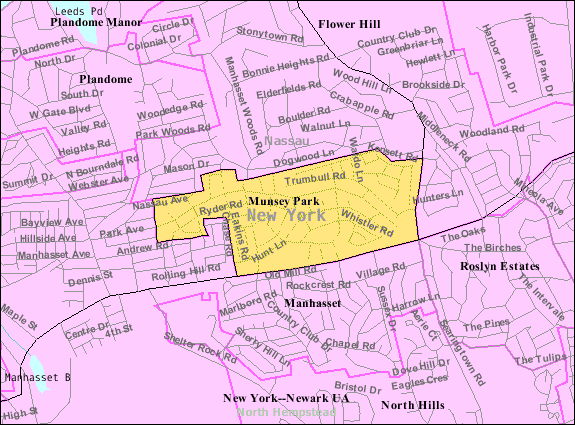
U.S. Census map of Munsey Park

According to the United States Census Bureau, the village has a total area of 0.5 square miles (1.3 km^{2}), all of it being land.

Munsey Park, in its entirety, uses the Manhasset, NY 11030 postal code and is served by the Manhasset Post Office.

=== Topography ===
Like the rest of Long Island's North Shore, Munsey Park is situated on a terminal moraine, which is named the Harbor Hill Moraine. This moraine was formed by glaciers during the Wisconsin Glacial Episode, and is named for Harbor Hill in Roslyn; Harbor Hill is the highest geographic point in Nassau County.

=== Drainage ===
Munsey Park is split between two minor drainage areas: Leeds Pond and Whitney Pond. These two drainage areas are sub-watersheds of the larger Manhasset Bay Watershed, which in turn is part of the larger Long Island Sound/Atlantic Ocean Watershed, which covers all of Nassau and Suffolk Counties.

=== Climate ===
The Village of Munsey Park features a humid subtropical climate (Cfa) under the Köppen climate classification. Accordingly, the village experiences hot, humid summers and cold winters, and experiences precipitation throughout the entirety of the year.

Climate data for Munsey Park, New York, 1991–2020 normals, extremes 1999–present
Month	Jan	Feb	Mar	Apr	May	Jun	Jul	Aug	Sep	Oct	Nov	Dec	Year
Record high °F (°C)	71 (22)	73 (23)	87 (31)	94 (34)	97 (36)	101 (38)	108 (42)	105 (41)	97 (36)	89 (32)	83 (28)	76 (24)	108 (42)
Mean daily maximum °F (°C)	40.4 (4.7)	42.9 (6.1)	51.1 (10.6)	61.2 (16.2)	70.6 (21.4)	79.6 (26.4)	84.5 (29.2)	83.3 (28.5)	76.0 (24.4)	65.4 (18.6)	55.7 (13.2)	45.1 (7.3)	63.0 (17.2)
Daily mean °F (°C)	33.4 (0.8)	35.0 (1.7)	42.0 (5.6)	51.8 (11.0)	60.8 (16.0)	70.1 (21.2)	75.2 (24.0)	74.1 (23.4)	67.2 (19.6)	56.5 (13.6)	47.8 (8.8)	38.2 (3.4)	54.3 (12.4)
Mean daily minimum °F (°C)	26.4 (−3.1)	27.1 (−2.7)	33.5 (0.8)	42.4 (5.8)	51.0 (10.6)	60.6 (15.9)	65.8 (18.8)	65.0 (18.3)	58.3 (14.6)	47.6 (8.7)	39.9 (4.4)	31.2 (−0.4)	45.7 (7.6)
Record low °F (°C)	−4 (−20)	−5 (−21)	5 (−15)	13 (−11)	34 (1)	43 (6)	50 (10)	46 (8)	36 (2)	27 (−3)	17 (−8)	−2 (−19)	−5 (−21)
Average precipitation inches (mm)	3.56 (90)	2.87 (73)	4.47 (114)	3.85 (98)	3.23 (82)	3.54 (90)	3.97 (101)	4.26 (108)	4.31 (109)	4.08 (104)	3.18 (81)	3.99 (101)	45.31 (1,151)
Average snowfall inches (cm)	5.5 (14)	7.8 (20)	3.7 (9.4)	0.3 (0.76)	0 (0)	0 (0)	0 (0)	0 (0)	0 (0)	0 (0)	0.2 (0.51)	5.7 (14)	23.2 (58.67)
Average precipitation days	8	9.1	11.4	14.3	16.5	17.4	18	16.8	13.4	13.1	8.8	11.7	158.5
Average snowy days	4.6	4.7	2.9	0.3	0	0	0	0	0	0.1	0.5	2.7	15.8
Average relative humidity (%)	73	75	72	72	75	74	73	71	73	73	71	75	73
Mean monthly sunshine hours	177	153	172	167	202	213	237	241	215	190	210	171	2,348
Mean daily daylight hours	9.6	10.7	12.0	13.3	14.5	15.1	14.8	13.8	12.5	11.1	9.9	9.3	12.2
Average ultraviolet index	2	2	2	3	5	6	6	6	5	3	2	2	4
Source: NOAA; Weather Atlas

== Demographics ==
Historical population
Census	Pop.	Note	%±
1930	411		—
1940	1,456		254.3%
1950	2,048		40.7%
1960	2,847		39.0%
1970	2,980		4.7%
1980	2,806		−5.8%
1990	2,692		−4.1%
2000	2,632		−2.2%
2010	2,693		2.3%
2020	2,809		4.3%
U.S. Decennial Census

=== Racial and ethnic composition ===
Munsey Park village, New York – Racial and ethnic composition Note: the US Census treats Hispanic/Latino as an ethnic category. This table excludes Latinos from the racial categories and assigns them to a separate category. Hispanics/Latinos may be of any race.
Race / Ethnicity (NH = Non-Hispanic)	Pop 2000	Pop 2010	Pop 2020	% 2000	% 2010	% 2020
White alone (NH)	2,417	2,380	2,141	91.83%	88.38%	76.22%
Black or African American alone (NH)	8	11	29	0.30%	0.41%	1.03%
Native American or Alaska Native alone (NH)	0	0	1	0.00%	0.00%	0.04%
Asian alone (NH)	149	173	378	5.66%	6.42%	13.46%
Native Hawaiian or Pacific Islander alone (NH)	0	0	1	0.00%	0.00%	0.04%
Other race alone (NH)	0	1	8	0.00%	0.04%	0.28%
Mixed race or Multiracial (NH)	15	41	102	0.57%	1.52%	3.63%
Hispanic or Latino (any race)	43	87	149	1.63%	3.23%	5.30%
Total	2,632	2,693	2,809	100.00%	100.00%	100.00%

=== 2020 census ===
As of the 2020 census, Munsey Park had a population of 2,809. The median age was 41.1 years. 30.2% of residents were under the age of 18 and 16.3% of residents were 65 years of age or older. For every 100 females there were 105.5 males, and for every 100 females age 18 and over there were 97.8 males age 18 and over.

100.0% of residents lived in urban areas, while 0.0% lived in rural areas.

There were 821 households in Munsey Park, of which 51.8% had children under the age of 18 living in them. Of all households, 81.6% were married-couple households, 6.3% were households with a male householder and no spouse or partner present, and 10.7% were households with a female householder and no spouse or partner present. About 8.9% of all households were made up of individuals and 7.2% had someone living alone who was 65 years of age or older.

There were 842 housing units, of which 2.5% were vacant. The homeowner vacancy rate was 0.7% and the rental vacancy rate was 0.0%.

=== 2010 census ===
As of the census of 2010, there were 2,693 people residing in the village. The racial makeup of the village was 91.20% White, 0.41% African American, 6.46% Asian, 0.37% from other races, and 1.56% from two or more races. Hispanic or Latino of any race were 3.23% of the population.

=== 2000 census ===
As of the census of 2000, there were 2,632 people, 817 households, and 731 families residing in the village. The population density was 5,073.4 inhabitants per square mile (1,958.9/km^{2}). There were 833 housing units at an average density of 1,605.7 per square mile (620.0/km^{2}). The racial makeup of the village was 93.35% White, 0.34% African American, 5.66% Asian, 0.08% from other races, and 0.57% from two or more races. Hispanic or Latino of any race were 1.63% of the population.

There were 817 households, out of which 48.6% had children under the age of 18 living with them, 82.6% were married couples living together, 5.0% had a female householder with no husband present, and 10.5% were non-families. 9.3% of all households were made up of individuals, and 5.3% had someone living alone who was 65 years of age or older. The average household size was 3.22 and the average family size was 3.43.

In the village, the population was spread out, with 30.8% under the age of 18, 4.8% from 18 to 24, 23.6% from 25 to 44, 28.5% from 45 to 64, and 12.4% who were 65 years of age or older. The median age was 40 years. For every 100 females, there were 98.9 males. For every 100 females age 18 and over, there were 93.3 males.

The median income for a household in the village was $149,100, and the median income for a family was $159,147. Males had a median income of $100,000 versus $46,250 for females. The per capita income for the village was $66,772. About 1.6% of families and 2.3% of the population were below the poverty line, including 2.5% of those under age 18 and 1.2% of those age 65 or over.

== Economy ==
Munsey Park is a bedroom community of the City of New York, which is how the community was originally envisioned as being by the Metropolitan Museum of Art. Accordingly, a significant number of village residents commute to/from New York for work.

The village itself is predominantly residential in character, with the heavy majority of lots within the village being zoned for single-family homes and with no lots zoned for multifamily residential. The only businesses within Munsey Park are at three shopping centers along the north side of Northern Boulevard; these are the only areas of the Village zoned for commercial use. The largest of the shopping centers in Munsey Park – Munsey Park Plaza – is located at the southeast corner of the village and houses tenants including Whole Foods and Benihana; it has also previously housed a Bonwit Teller and a Bed Bath & Beyond. Developers unsuccessfully proposed rebuilding the shopping center as a luxury shopping mall in the late 1980s and early 1990s.

When originally planned, the intersection of Manhasset Woods Road and Park Avenue was to contain businesses, as well as near Locust Place (now Munsey Place); these plans were eventually amended in favor of additional single-family homes.

== Government ==
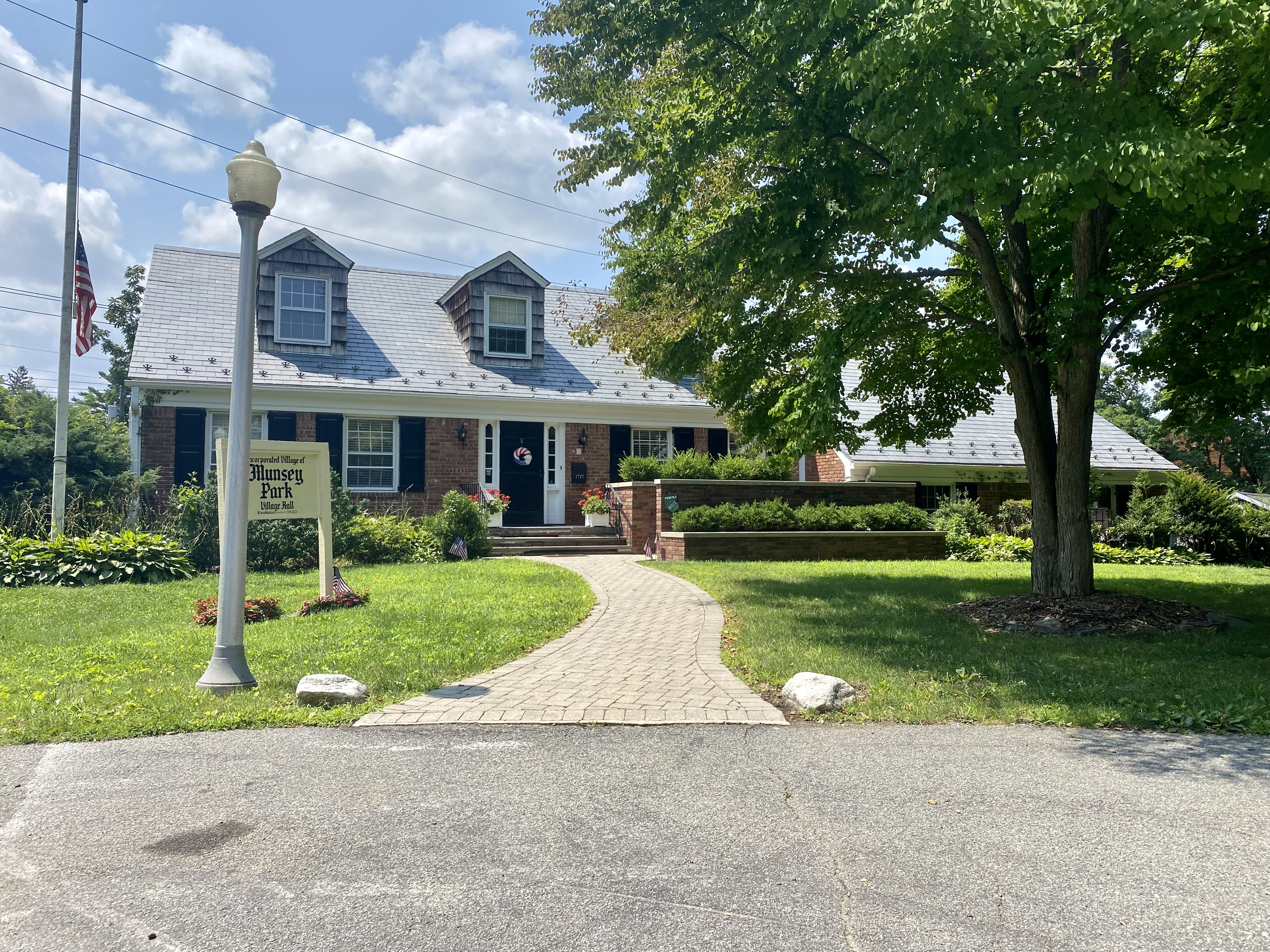
Munsey Park Village Hall in 2021

=== Village government ===
Munsey Park's government is divided into three boards. All of the boards are non-partisan, and members do not get paid. The main organ of government is the Village of Munsey Park Board of Trustees, which functions as the equivalent of a city council.

As of September 2025, the Mayor of Munsey Park is Lawrence "Larry" Ceriello, the Deputy Mayor is Patty Miller, and the Village Trustees are Bruno Carusone, Regina Im, Gregory Licalzi Jr., and Patty Miller.

=== Representation in higher government ===
On the town level, Munsey Park is located in the Town of North Hempstead's 5th council district, which as of June 2026 is represented on the North Hempstead Town Council by Yaron Levy (R–Harbor Hills).

At the county level, Munsey Park is located in Nassau County's 10th Legislative district, which as of June 2026 is represented in the Nassau County Legislature by Mazi Melesa Pilip (R – Great Neck).

At the state level, Munsey Park is located within the New York State Assembly's 16th State Assembly district and the New York State Senate's 7th State Senate district. As of June 2026, they are represented by Daniel J. Norber (R–Great Neck) and Jack M. Martins (R–Old Westbury), respectively.

At the federal level, the village is located in New York's 3rd congressional district, which as of June 2026 is represented in the United States Congress by Thomas R. Suozzi (D–Glen Cove). Additionally, like the rest of New York, Munsey Park is represented in the United States Senate by Charles E. Schumer (D) and Kirsten E. Gillibrand (D).

=== Politics ===
Munsey Park contains 2 election districts: AD 16 – ED 63 and AD 16 – ED 64. Both of these districts are located within New York's 16th State Assembly district (AD16) and are entirely within the village.

In the 2024 U.S. presidential election, the majority of Munsey Park voters voted for Donald J. Trump (R).

== Education ==
=== School district ===
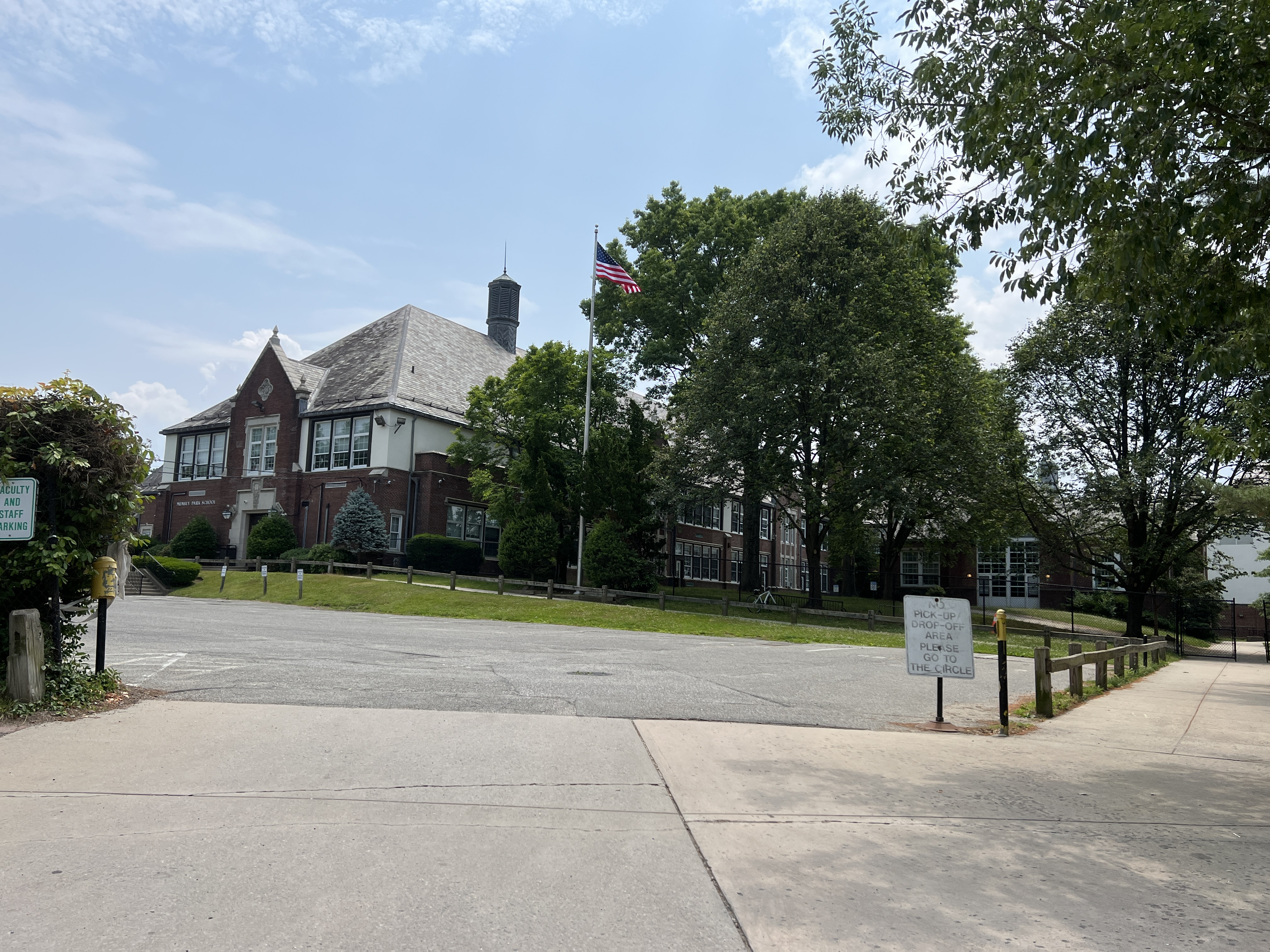
The Munsey Park Elementary School on June 17, 2023

The Village of Munsey Park is located entirely within the boundaries of (and is thus served by) the Manhasset Union Free School District. Accordingly, all children who reside within Munsey Park and attend public schools go to Manhasset's schools.

The Manhasset School District's Munsey Park Elementary School is located at the southern end of the village.

=== Library district ===
Munsey Park is located entirely within the boundaries of (and is thus served by) the Manhasset Library District.

== Media ==
=== Newspapers ===
The Manhasset Press Times is the newspaper of record for the Village of Munsey Park. It is part of Schneps Media.

Other major newspapers serving Munsey Park include Newsday, New York Post, The New York Times, and The Wall Street Journal.

=== Television ===
According to the Federal Communications Commission, Munsey Park – like all other communities on Long Island – is located within (and is thus served by) the New York, NY Television Market Area.

==== Public-access television ====
Munsey Park is one of North Shore TV's fourteen member villages. North Shore TV provides Munsey Park and the other member villages with public-access television programming, through Optimum and Verizon Fios – the main cable television providers in the area.

== Parks and recreation ==
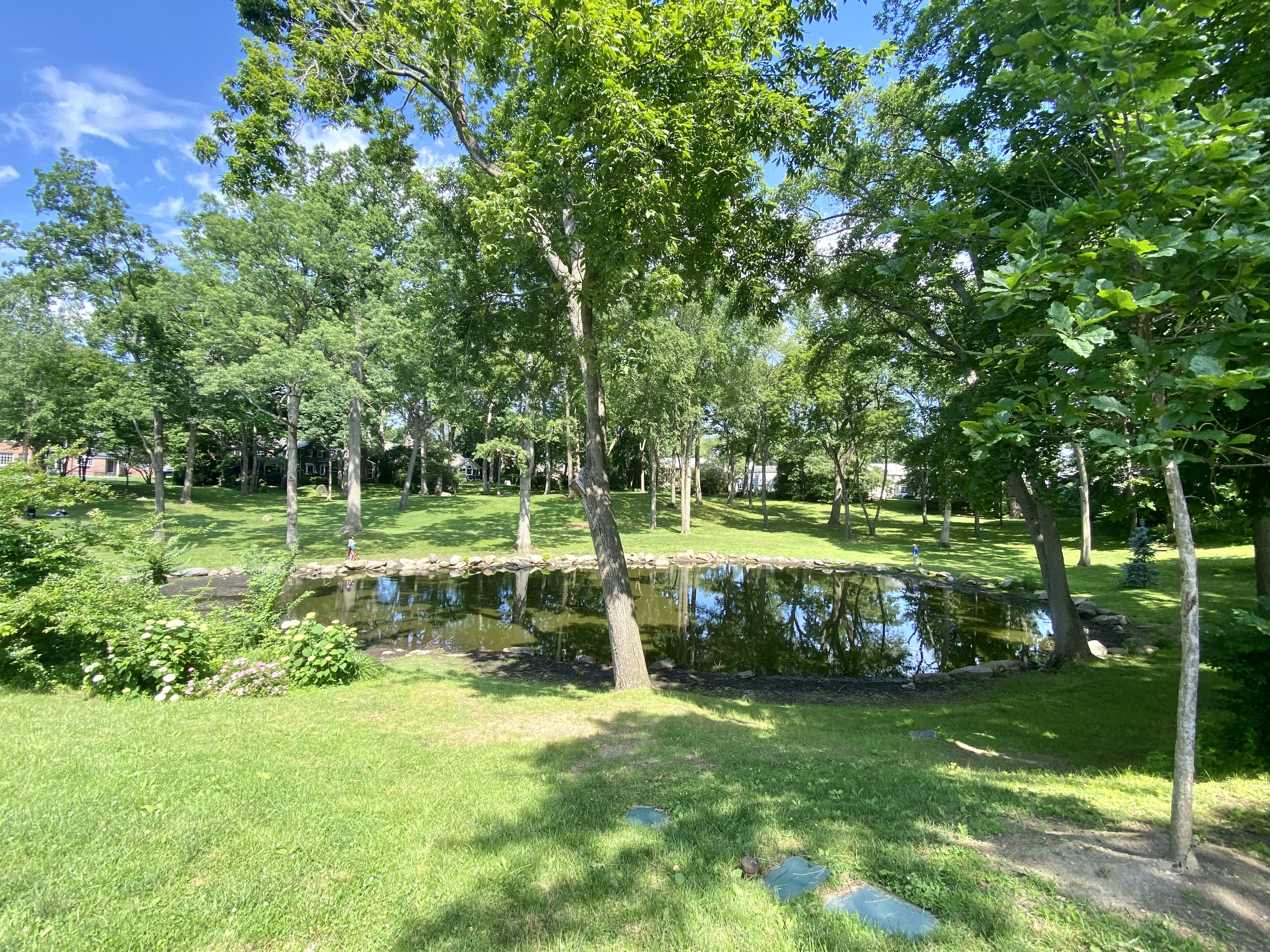
Waldmann Memorial Park in June 2021

Munsey Park owns and operates two municipal parks:

- Copley Pond Park
- Waldmann Memorial Park

The 18-hole Munsey Park Golf Club was formerly located at the eastern end of the village from 1932 until 1937, and the Munsey Park Elementary School – located at the southern part of the village – features a playground and recreational fields.

=== Park district ===
Munsey Park is wholly located within the boundaries of (and is thus served by) the Manhasset Park District. This special park district owns and operates numerous parks and parking facilities throughout the Greater Manhasset area.

== Infrastructure ==
=== Transportation ===
==== Roads ====
Munsey Park is directly served by two state roads, which additionally form portions of the village's boundaries. Northern Boulevard (NY 25A) forms the southern border of the village, while Port Washington Boulevard (NY 101) forms its eastern border.

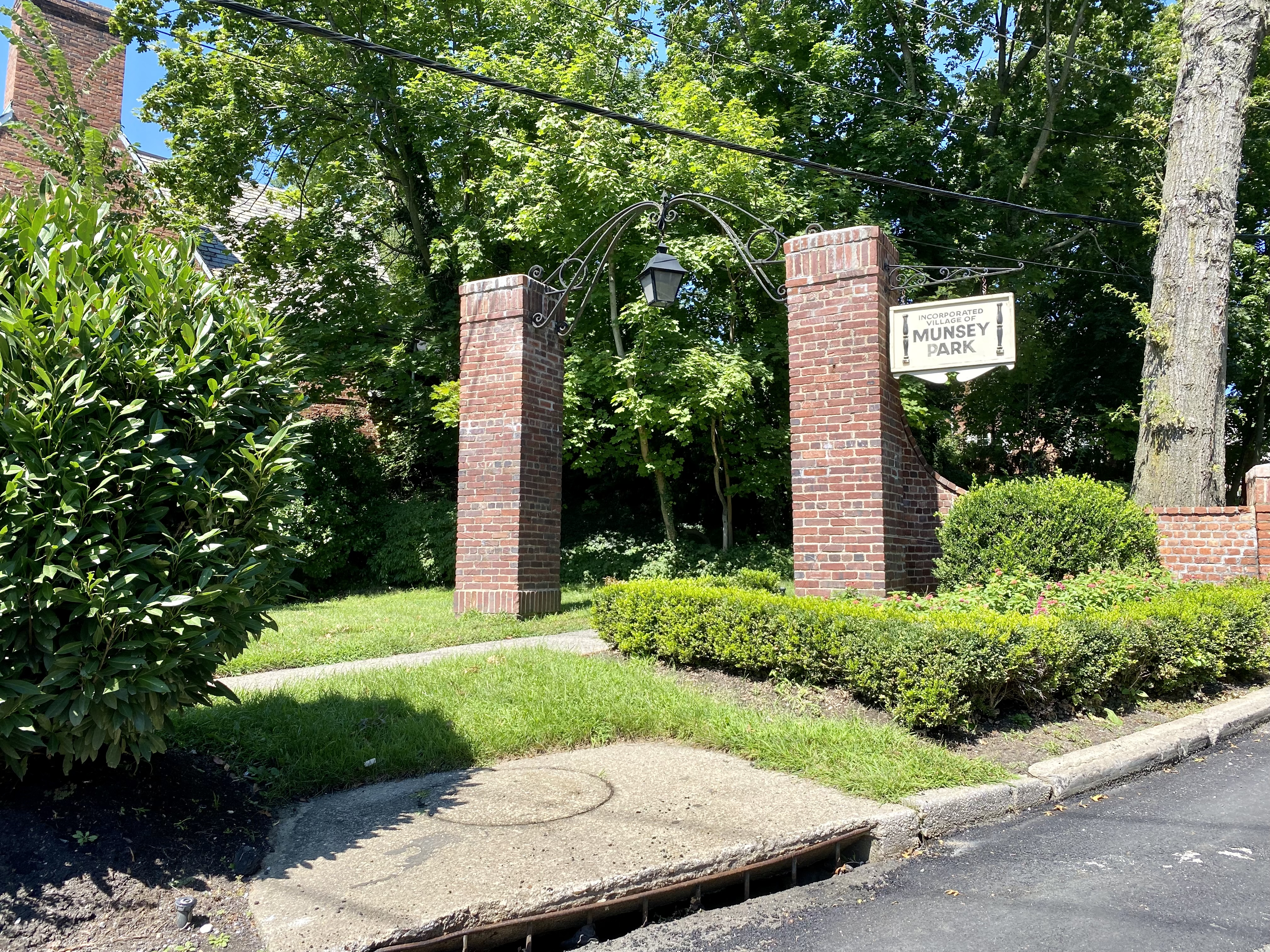
Entrance piers to the village at the Manhasset Woods Road–Northern Boulevard (NY 25A) intersection in 2021

Other major streets within the village include Park Avenue, Park Avenue North, and Manhasset Woods Road.

Many streets – such as Sargent Place, Eakins Road, ad Ryder Road – use a street naming convention based on famous artists.

Furthermore, the village maintains roughly 10.2 miles (16.4 km) of roads.

==== Rail ====
No rail lines pass through Munsey Park. The nearest Long Island Rail Road station to the village is Manhasset on the Port Washington Branch.

==== Bus ====
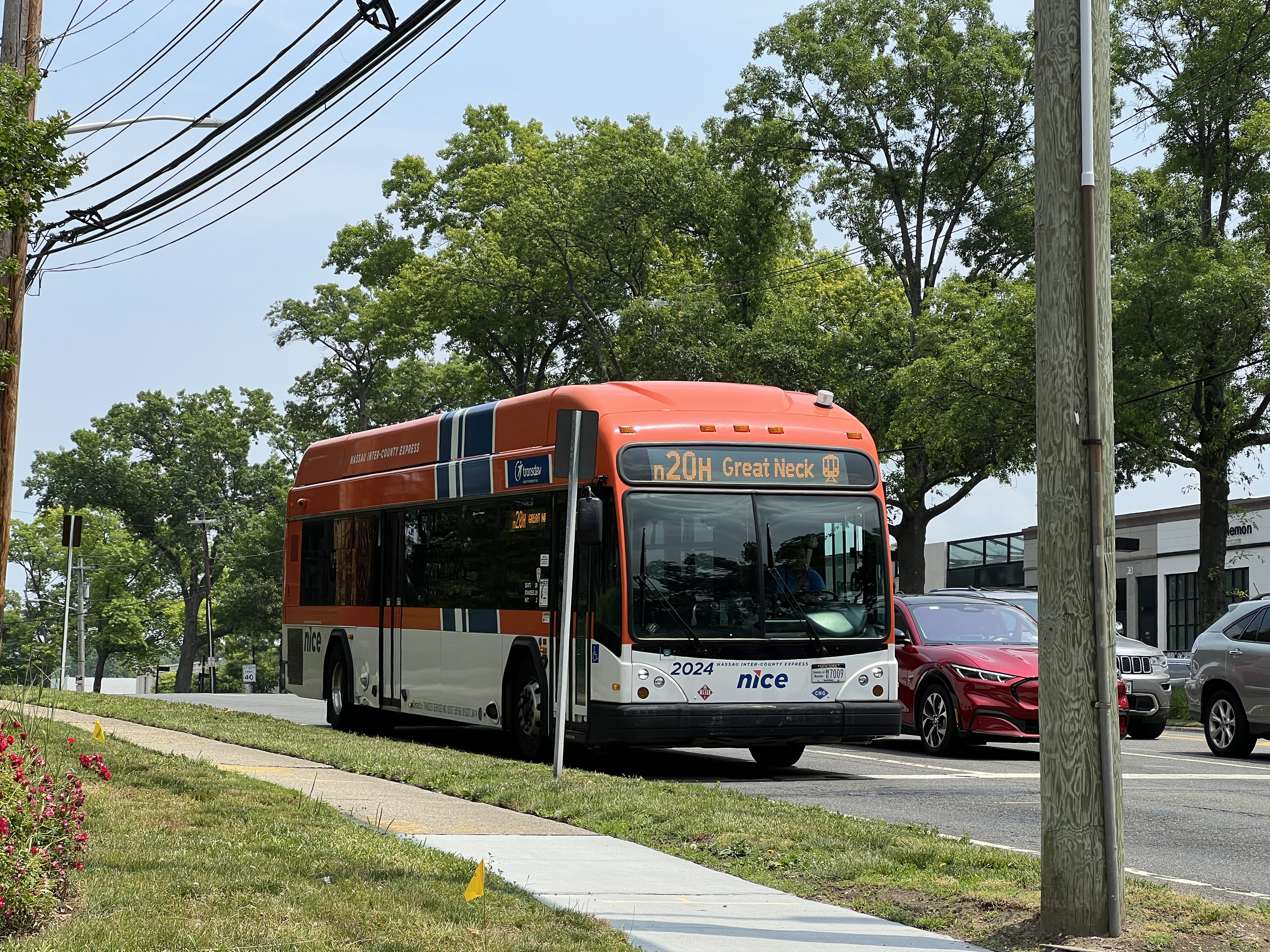
A Great Neck-bound n20H bus on Northern Boulevard (NY 25A) in Munsey Park on June 17, 2023

Munsey Park is served by the n20H, n20X, n21, and n23 bus routes – all four of which are operated by Nassau Inter-County Express (NICE). The n20H, n20X, and n21 each travel through the area via Northern Boulevard, while the n23 does so via Port Washington Boulevard.

=== Utilities ===
==== Natural gas ====
National Grid USA provides natural gas to homes and businesses that are hooked up to natural gas lines in Munsey Park.

==== Power ====
PSEG Long Island provides power to all homes and businesses within Munsey Park, on behalf of the Long Island Power Authority.

==== Sewage ====
Munsey Park is unsewered. Accordingly, the entirety of the village relies on cesspools and septic systems, as opposed to being connected to sanitary sewers.

==== Water ====
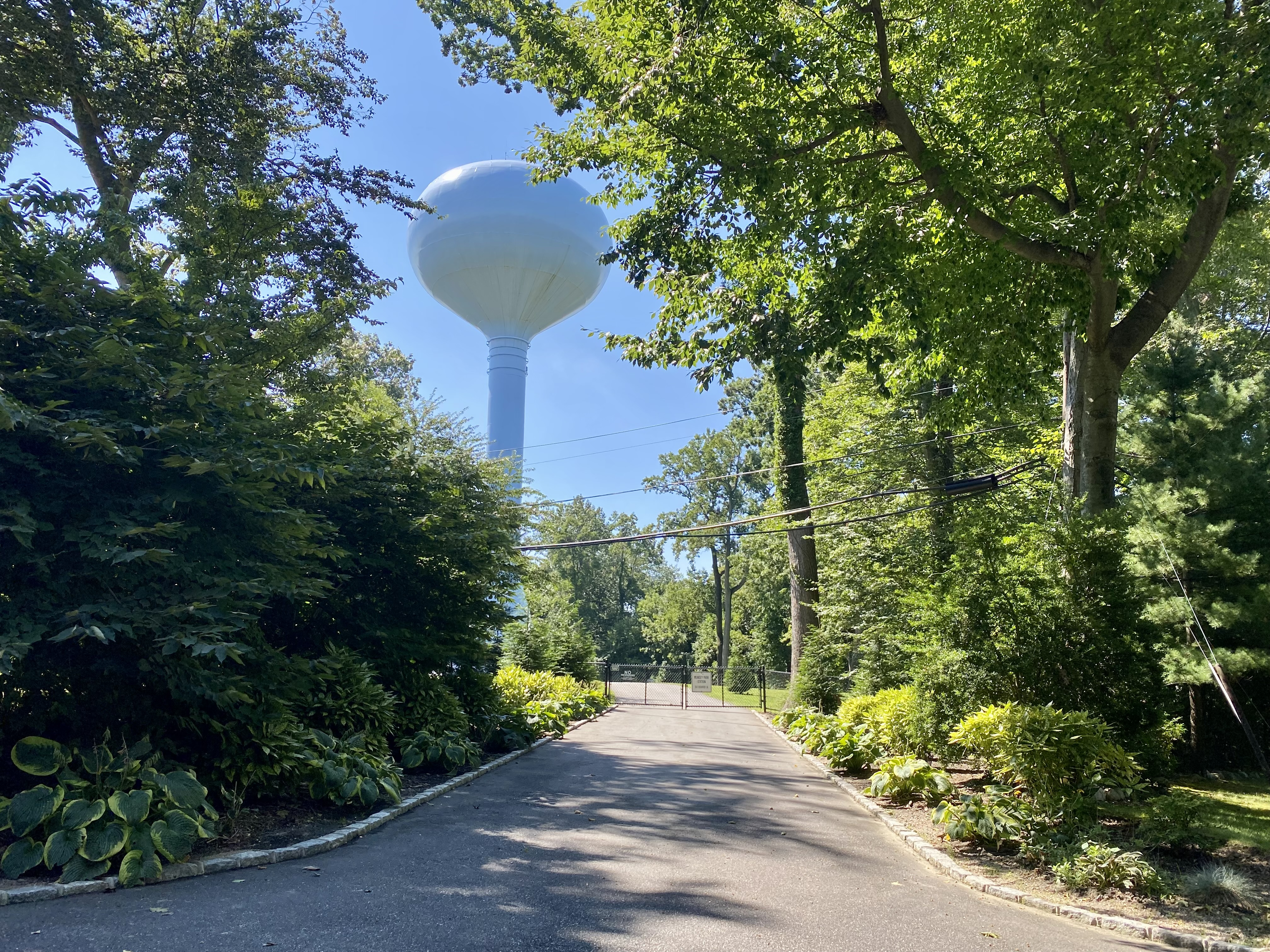
The Munsey Park Water Tower in 2021

Munsey Park is located within the boundaries of the Manhasset–Lakeville Water District, which provides the entirety of Munsey Park with water.

The Manhasset–Lakeville Water District also owns and operates a water tower within the village, known as the Munsey Park Water Tower.

=== Telecommunications ===
According to the Federal Communications Commission and the New York Public Service Commission, 100% of Munsey Park has broadband coverage.

=== Emergency services ===
==== Fire ====
Munsey Park is located entirely within the boundaries of (and is thus served by) the Manhasset–Lakeville Fire Department.

==== Law enforcement ====
The Village of Munsey Park is served by the 6th Precinct of the Nassau County Police Department, with RMP 609 assigned as the Munsey Park patrol car.

Policing is funded through village and county taxes.

== Notable people ==
- Arthur G. Elvin – Engineer, inventor, and the first Mayor of Flower Hill – as well as the former Mayor of Plandome; moved to Munsey Park after resigning, following the death of his wife.
- Harry Goz – Actor; lived on Manhasset Woods Road within the village.
- William E. Haugaard – Architect. Haugaard served as the State Architect for the State of New York between 1928 and 1944.
- Elaine R. Phillips – Financial adviser and politician. Phillips had served as a Village Trustee before moving to adjacent Flower Hill, where she would serve as Mayor before being elected to the New York State Senate in 2016 and then as Nassau County Comptroller in 2021.
- Madeline Singas – Associate judge of the New York Court of Appeals and former Nassau County District Attorney.
- Jeanne Singer – Pianist and composer.

== In popular culture ==
Over the years, scenes for shows and movies have been filmed within the village. These include scenes for the film The Good Shepherd, which were shot within Munsey Park in 2005, and scenes for the television series The Good Wife, which were shot within the village in 2009.

== See also ==
- List of Tree Cities USA
- List of municipalities in New York
