= Waldmann Memorial Park =

Park in Munsey Park, Nassau County, New York, United States

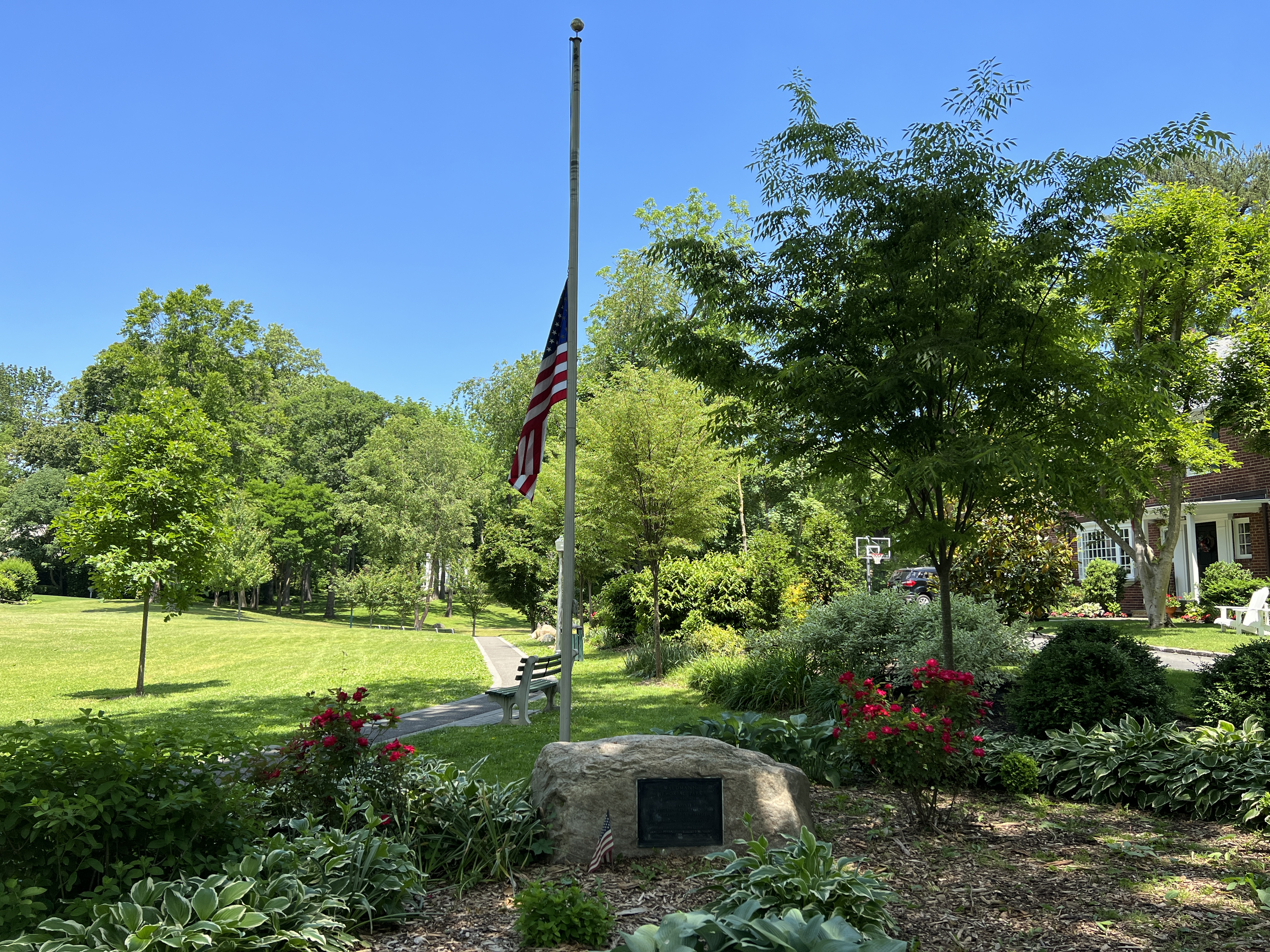
- Waldmann Memorial Park in 2022
- Interactive map of Waldmann Memorial Park
- Type: Public
- Location: Munsey Park, New York
- Coordinates: 40°48′4″N 73°40′53″W
- Area: 3.5 acres (1.4 ha)
- Established: 1941 (acquired); May 30, 1946 (official dedication)
- Owner: Incorporated Village of Munsey Park

Waldmann Memorial Park is a 3.5-acre (1.4 ha) park located within the Incorporated Village of Munsey Park, in Nassau County, New York, United States.

== Description ==
The park features a walkway, seating areas, and a natural pond, known as Pollywog Pond. It is also home to the Village of Munsey Park's veterans memorial, adjacent to the Park Avenue entrance.

Waldmann Park also serves as the location of the Village of Munsey Park's annual Memorial Day ceremony.

== History ==
In 1933, the parcel was offered to the Village of Munsey Park for temporary use by the Metropolitan Museum of Art, which had developed Munsey Park. It was formally gifted as a park to the village during the first week of America's involvement in World War II, in 1941.

Waldmann Memorial Park was named after Munsey Park resident George Raymond Waldmann in 1943 – a lieutenant in World War II who had been killed in the European Theatre; Waldmann was the first resident of the village to be killed in the war. The park – a veterans memorial to all village residents killed in combat – was formally dedicated on Memorial Day in 1946, following the end of the war.

In 2025, village officials proposed installing a playground in the park.

== See also ==
- Islandia Veterans Memorial Triangle
- Rainbow Monument Park
- Veterans of Foreign Wars Memorial Park
