= Manhasset Valley Park =

Park in Manhasset, New York

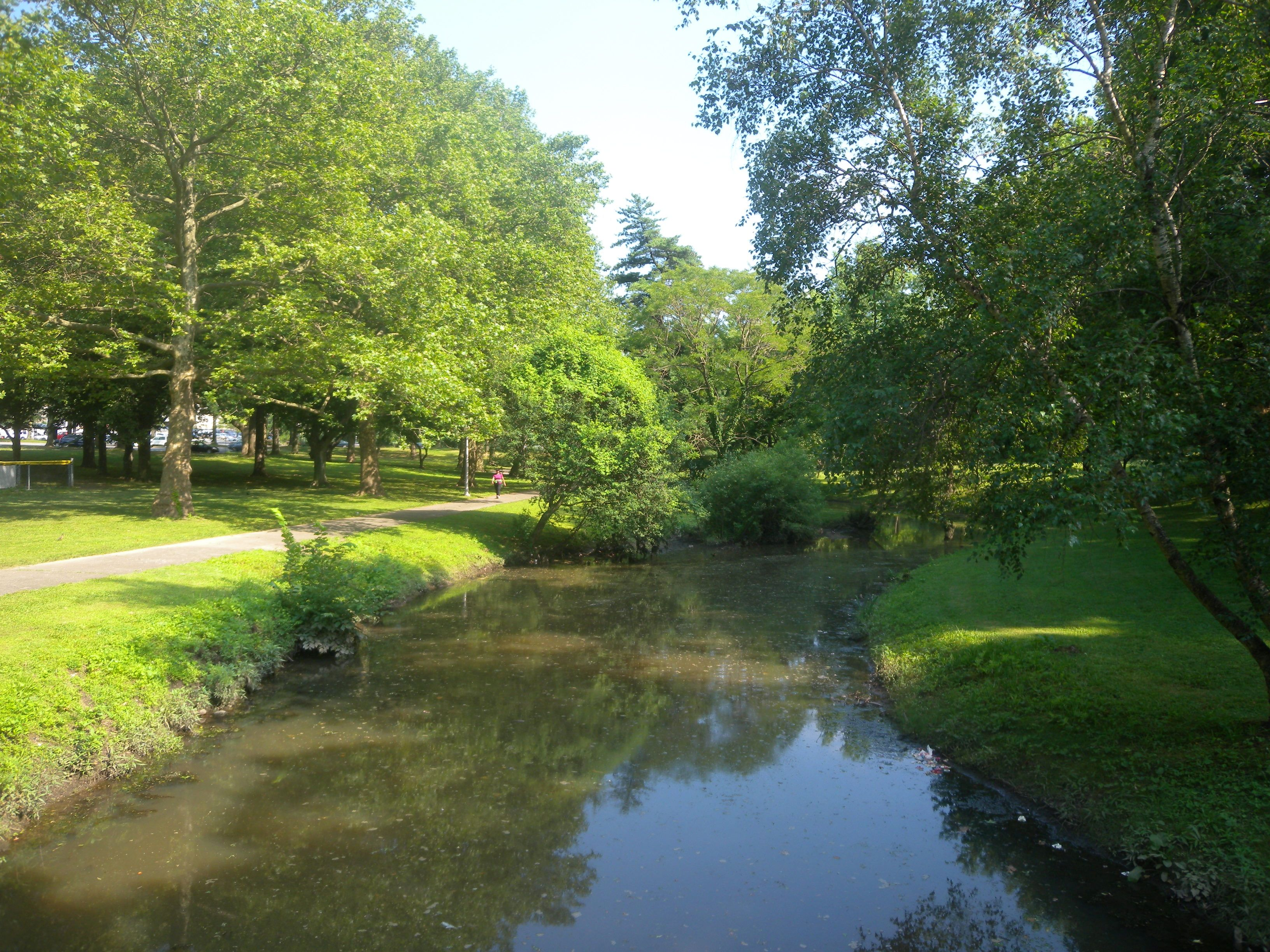
- Manhasset Valley Park in 2012
- Interactive map of Manhasset Valley Park
- Type: Public
- Location: Manhasset, New York, United States
- Coordinates: 40°47′24″N 73°42′25″W
- Area: 26.6 acres (10.8 ha)
- Opened: c.1954
- Owner: Town of North Hempstead
- Paths: Yes
- Parking: Yes
- Website: Town of North Hempstead – Manhasset Valley Park

Manhasset Valley Park is a public park located in Manhasset, on Long Island, in New York, United States. It is owned and operated by the Town of North Hempstead.

== Description ==
Manhasset Valley Park is located in the valley separating the Great Neck Peninsula from the Cow Neck (Port Washington) Peninsula, at the southern end of Manhasset Bay.

The park contains walking paths, a playground, and athletic fields. A stream flows through the park, emptying into Manhasset Bay to its immediate north, with footbridges crossing over the stream within the park.

The park is roughly 26.6 acres (10.8 ha) in total size.

== History ==
Before the Long Island Rail Road's Port Washington Branch was extended from Great Neck to Port Washington via the Manhasset Viaduct, the commercial heart of Manhasset was located in this area, which was nicknamed "The Valley." After the Port Washington Branch was extended to Port Washington and the Manhasset station opened on Plandome Road, the commercial center of the hamlet moved there; that area was nicknamed "The Hill."

Manhasset Valley Park was established circa 1954, as part of a slum clearance project in the Manhasset Valley area. As part of the project, a historic local schoolhouse was moved to the property to operate as a museum.

The park was operated by Nassau County from its establishment in the 1950s until the 2000s, when it was transferred to the Town of North Hempstead. The transfer of ownership was part of an effort made by Nassau County to reduce the county's expenditures and spendings – measures stemming from a fiscal crisis.

In the 2010s, after taking ownership of Manhasset Valley Park, the Town of North Hempstead renovated and modernized the park's facilities, playgrounds, and fields. Further park renovations were completed later in the decade, including the completion of a new, $440,000 comfort station and park maintenance facility.

== Town of North Hempstead 9/11 Memorial ==
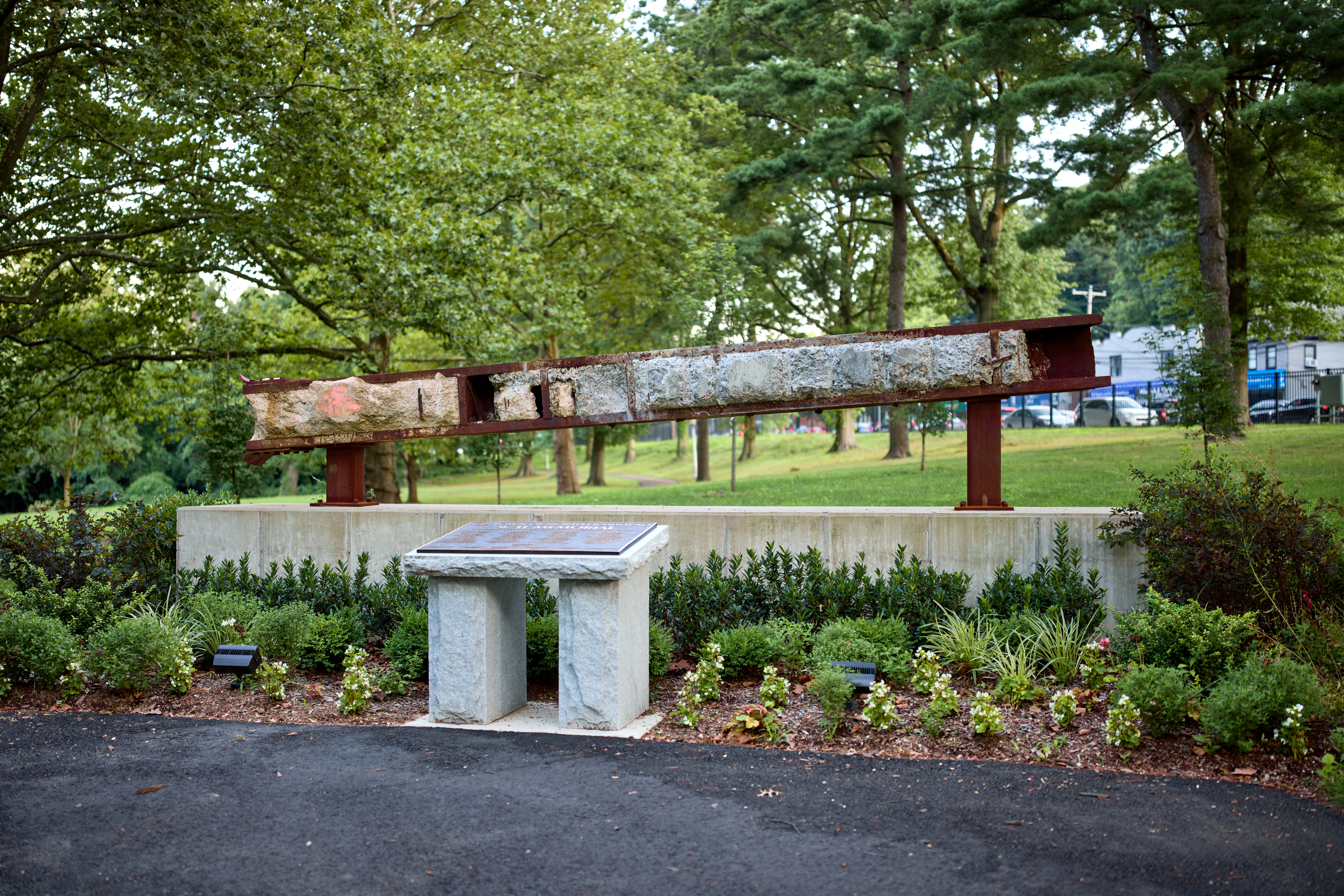
The Town of North Hempstead 9/11 Memorial in 2022

The Town of North Hempstead 9/11 Memorial is the Town of North Hempstead's memorial to the September 11, 2001 terrorist attacks, located within Manhasset Valley Park.

The final components of the memorial were constructed beginning in May 2025 and was dedicated on September 11 of that year. The memorial consists of a large plaza with flags and seating areas, with a beam from the Twin Towers located within – and being the focal point of – the center of the plaza, on a pedestal.

In 2025, the memorial was expanded by the Town of North Hempstead. As part of the expansion project, new plaques and a granite wall were installed, with the names of the 56 North Hempstead residents who were murdered in the terrorist attacks being inscribed, with additional space reserved for any residents of the town who have – or will – succumb to illnesses caused as a result of the attacks.

Prior to the memorial's completion in 2025, a smaller memorial plaque had been installed in 2015, while the steel beam from the Twin Towers was originally installed in 2021.

== See also ==
- Clark Botanic Garden
- Plandome Pond Park
- Gerry Park
- North Hempstead Town Dock
- Manorhaven Beach Park
