= Bay Walk Park =

Park in Port Washington North, New York, United States

- Robert H. Dayton Park; Thomas J. Pellegrino Waterfront Park
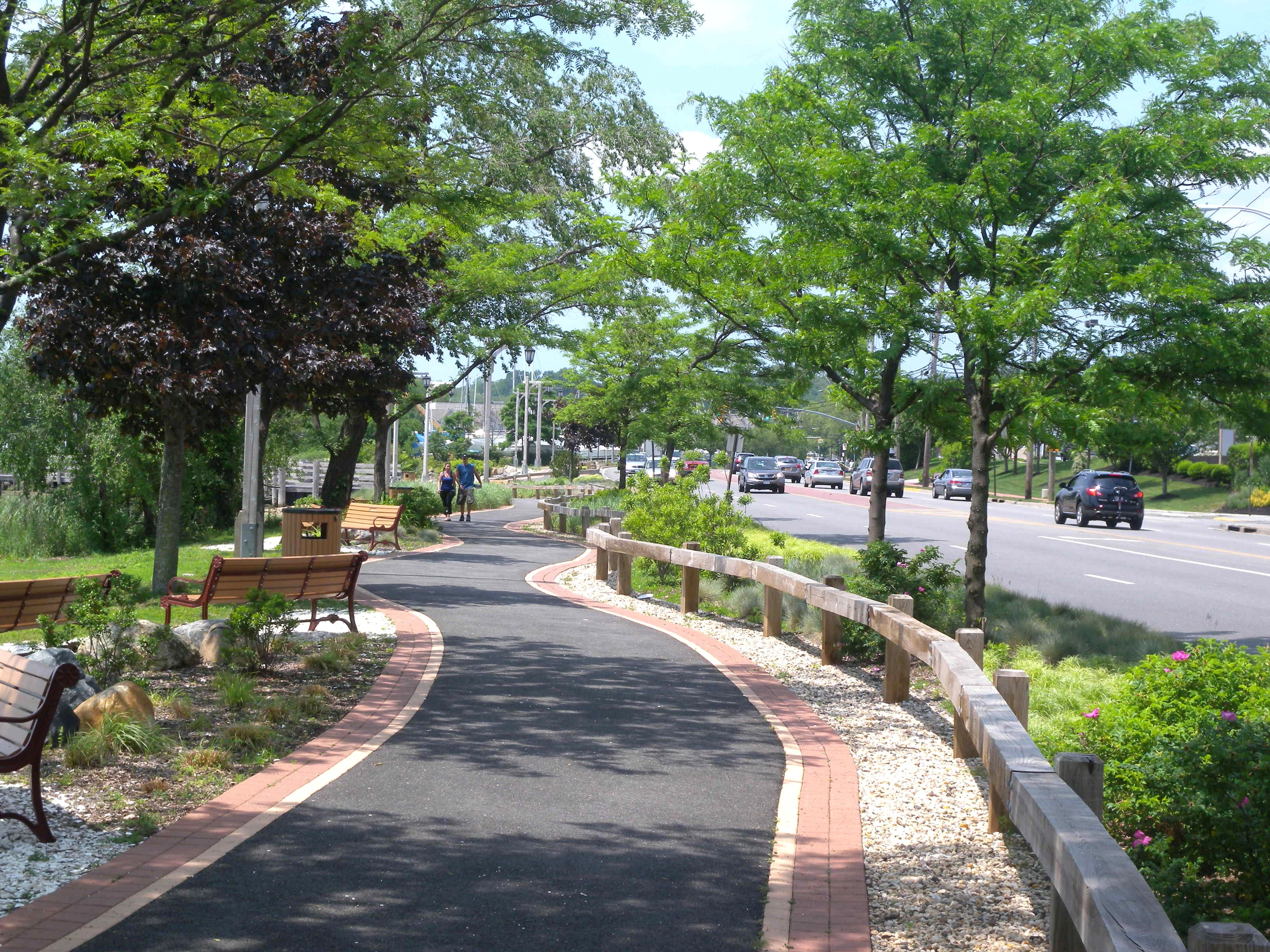
- The BayWalk path in Bay Walk Park in 2011
- Interactive map of Bay Walk Park
- Type: Public
- Location: Shore Road, Port Washington North, New York
- Coordinates: 40.83637°N 73.70220°W
- Area: 1.7 acres (0.69 ha)
- Owner: Village of Port Washington North; Town of North Hempstead
- Paths: Yes
- Parking: Yes

Bay Walk Park is a 1.7-acre (0.69 ha) public park located along the Manhasset BayWalk promenade in the Village of Port Washington North, within the Town of North Hempstead, in New York, United States.

The park also consists of the Village of Port Washington North Nautical Art Museum, the Village of Port Washington North Pier, Thomas J. Pellegrino Waterfront Park, and Robert H. Dayton Park – in addition to forming a segment of the Town of North Hempstead's larger Manhasset BayWalk promenade.

== Description ==
Jointly constructed and owned by the Village of Port Washington North and the Town of North Hempstead, Bay Walk Park is situated along the shore of Manhasset Bay within Port Washington North, running along the west side of Shore Road (CR E25).

Built in phases, the park consists of a large promenade with a shared pedestrian and bicycle path, the village's Nautical Art Museum, the Village of Port Washington North Pier, Port Washington North's Thomas J. Pellegrino Waterfront Park, and North Hempstead's Robert H. Dayton Park. It additionally features a kayak launch point, interpretive signage, seating and picnic areas, and parking.

Bay Walk Park consists of a total of 1.7 acres (0.69 ha) – of which 1.4 acres (0.57 ha) are owned by Port Washington North and 0.28 acres (0.11 ha) are owned by North Hempstead.

== History ==
Bay Walk Park was first planned around the turn of the 21st century, as a means of revitalizing and preserving the waterfront, and to create new recreational opportunities in the community.

In 1992, the Town of Hempstead acquired the first parcel of land for what would eventually become Bay Walk Park from Nassau County; it was dedicated in 1993 as the Town of North Hempstead's Robert H. Dayton Park, named in honor of a late local firefighter.

In 2002, the Village of Port Washington purchased additional land for what would eventually become Bay Walk Park.

In 2003, the Port Washington North's master plan for the park was agreed upon by it and the Town of North Hempstead, along with the villages of Baxter Estates, Manorhaven, and Sands Point. About that same time, the administration of North Hempstead Town Supervisor May W. Newburger – in conjunction between the town and Baxter Estates, Manorhaven, and Port Washington North – established the 1.7-mile (2.7 km) Manhasset BayWalk – a walking and biking promenade running along the shore of Manhasset Bay, between the North Hempstead Town Dock in Port Washington and Manorhaven Beach Park in the Village of Manorhaven.

In 2004, the remaining land for Bay Walk Park was acquired by the Village of Port Washington North. This land, which had formerly been part of an oil transfer station, was donated to the village after the property was purchased for the construction of the Stop & Shop Plaza shopping center, which would be built on the portion of the existing property across the street in a redevelopment project.

Groundbreaking on Bay Walk Park took place in 2008. Construction would occur in two phases. The first phase – which included the planning work and the construction of the Village of Port Washington North Pier, the portion of the BayWalk promenade and multi-use path through the park, and the Nautical Art Museum – was completed in 2011, while the Village Pier was completed in 2009. The second phase – which included the parking lot, a self-irrigating garden, a charging station for electronic devices, a flagpole dedicated to veterans of the United States Armed Forces, a touch-screen information kiosk, a kayak launching station, and the Thomas J. Pellegrino Waterfront Park – was completed in 2017.

=== Future ===
The Town of North Hempstead plans to construct a purpose-built extension of its portions of the Manhasset BayWalk promenade unassociated with Port Washington North, south from the existing facilities at Bay Walk Park and towards Sunset Park and the North Hempstead Town Dock, in the 2020s.

== Robert H. Dayton Park ==
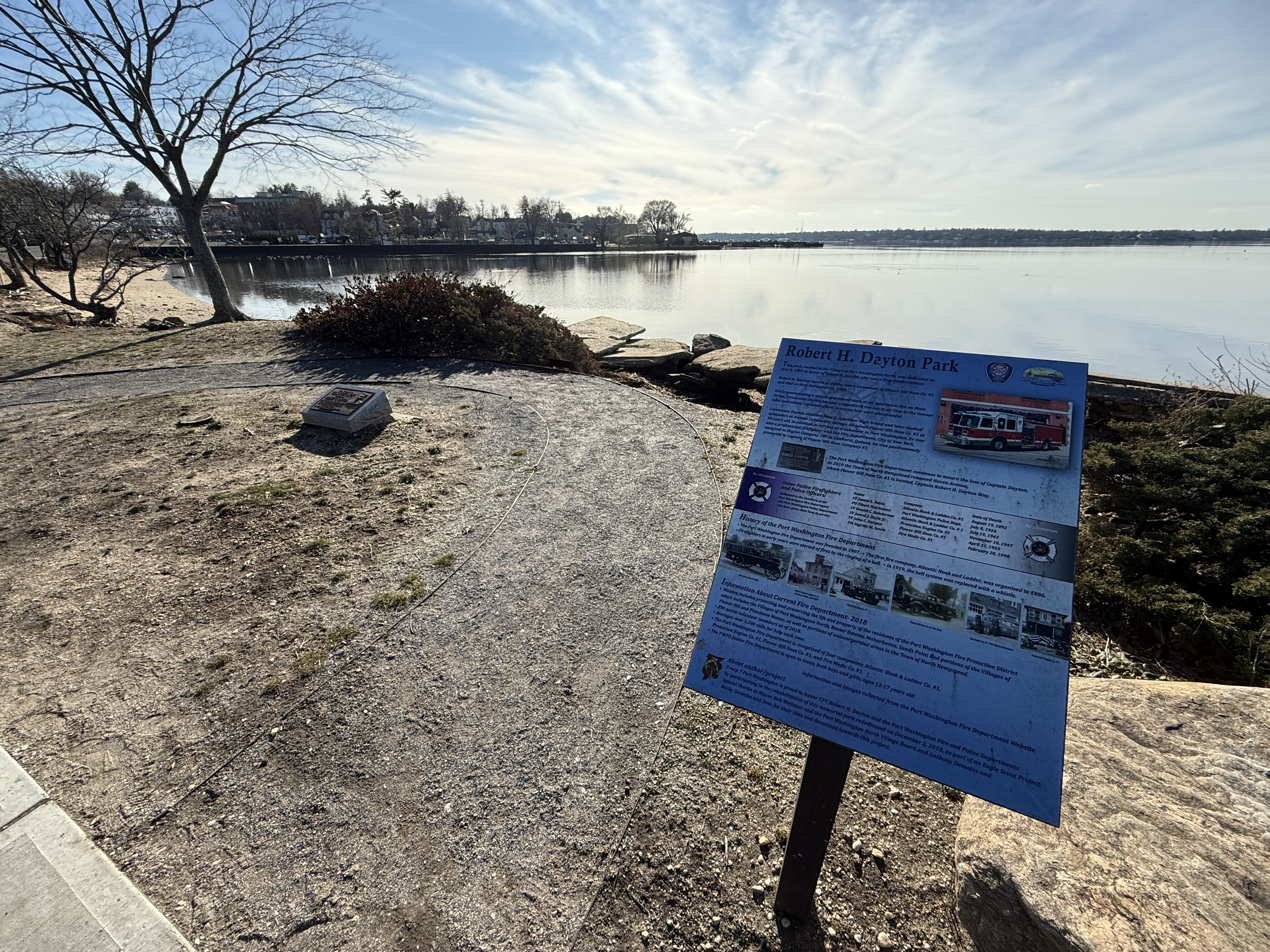
Robert H. Dayton Park in 2026

Robert H. Dayton Park is a 0.28-acre (0.11 ha) passive waterfront park along Manhasset Bay in Port Washington North, New York, owned by the Town of North Hempstead. It forms the town-owned portion of the larger, 1.7-acre (0.69 ha) Bay Walk Park complex.

=== History ===
In 1992, the land for Dayton Park was acquired from Nassau County. The park was dedicated in 1993 as the Town of North Hempstead's Robert H. Dayton Park, named in honor of a late local firefighter. It became part of the larger Bay Walk Park in the early 21st century, after it was approved in 2003 and constructed a few years later.

== See also ==
- North Hempstead Town Dock
- Sunset Park (Port Washington, New York)
