= North Hempstead Town Dock =

Public dock and park in Port Washington, New York, United States

- Town Dock Park
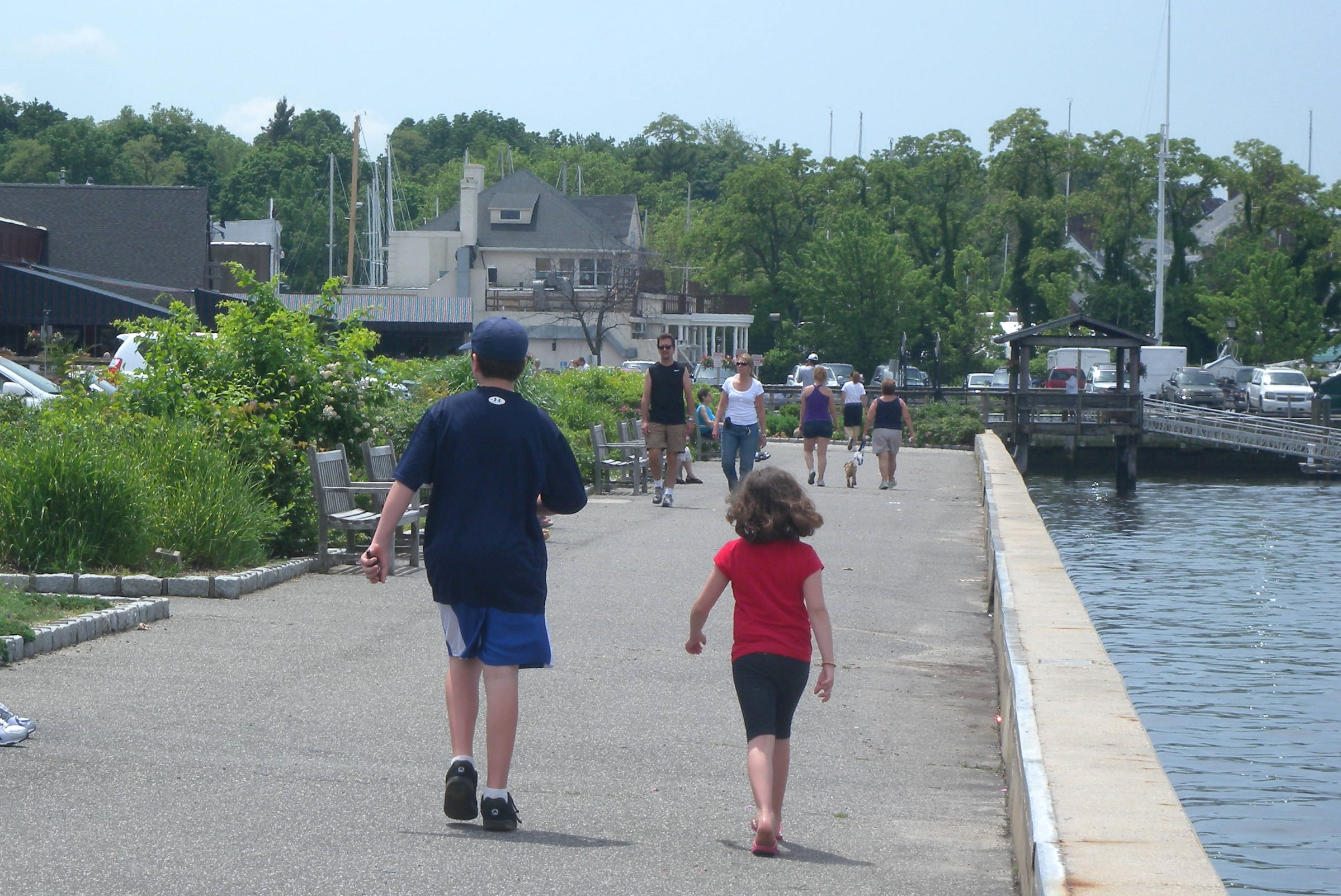
- The waterfront promenade at the North Hempstead Town Dock in 2011
- Interactive map of North Hempstead Town Dock
- Type: Public
- Location: Main Street, Port Washington, New York, United States
- Coordinates: 40°49′54.4″N 73°42′09.3″W
- Owner: Town of North Hempstead
- Operator: Town of North Hempstead
- Parking: Yes
- Website: www.northhempsteadny.gov/departments/parks_recreation/towndock.php

The North Hempstead Town Dock (also known as the Port Washington Town Dock, Town Dock Park, or simply Town Dock) is a public park and dock located along Manhasset Bay in downtown Port Washington, on Long Island, in New York, United States.

It is owned and operated by the Town of North Hempstead.

== Description ==
The North Hempstead Town Dock is located along Manhasset Bay in the heart of Port Washington. It consists of a promenade, parking, fishing facilities, and a public dock. A water taxi connects the dock – and all accessible docks and restaurants with such facilities along the waterfront – with the offshore mooring positions in Manhasset Bay, and additionally provides public tours of the bay.

The Town Dock is located adjacent to Sunset Park, which is owned and operated by the Port Washington Water Pollution Control District.

== History ==
The first section of North Hempstead Town Dock opened in 1908, after years of planning and disagreements as to the exact location within Port Washington where it should be built.

In 1949, construction commenced on a project to expand and modernize the Town Dock, under the administration of Town Supervisor Hartford N. Gunn Sr.; the project was completed in the early 1950s, and the wings protruding out at its western end were erected in 1954. As part of the project, the width of dock was also doubled from 50 feet (15 m) to 50 feet (15 m).

In 2016, the Town of North Hempstead announced that a $12.5 million federal grant from FEMA had been secured, for the replacement and modernization of the dock, which had been damaged by Hurricane Sandy in 2012. Additional state and federal grants were secured by the town over the next ten years for the project, with over $19 million in grant monies secured by the time of the $19.6 million project's official commencement in October 2025, when the project – long stalled by a delay in approval by federal agencies – was given the green light to begin from the United States Army Corps of Engineers. The town additionally approved $285,000 in renovations to the dock's Henry T. Aspinwall-designed administration building and restrooms in 2025.

== See also ==
- Sunset Park (Port Washington, New York)
- North Hempstead Beach Park
- Manorhaven Beach Park
- Merriman Park (Port Washington, New York)
