= Port Washington Water Pollution Control District =

Public sewer district in Nassau County, New York

- Official seal

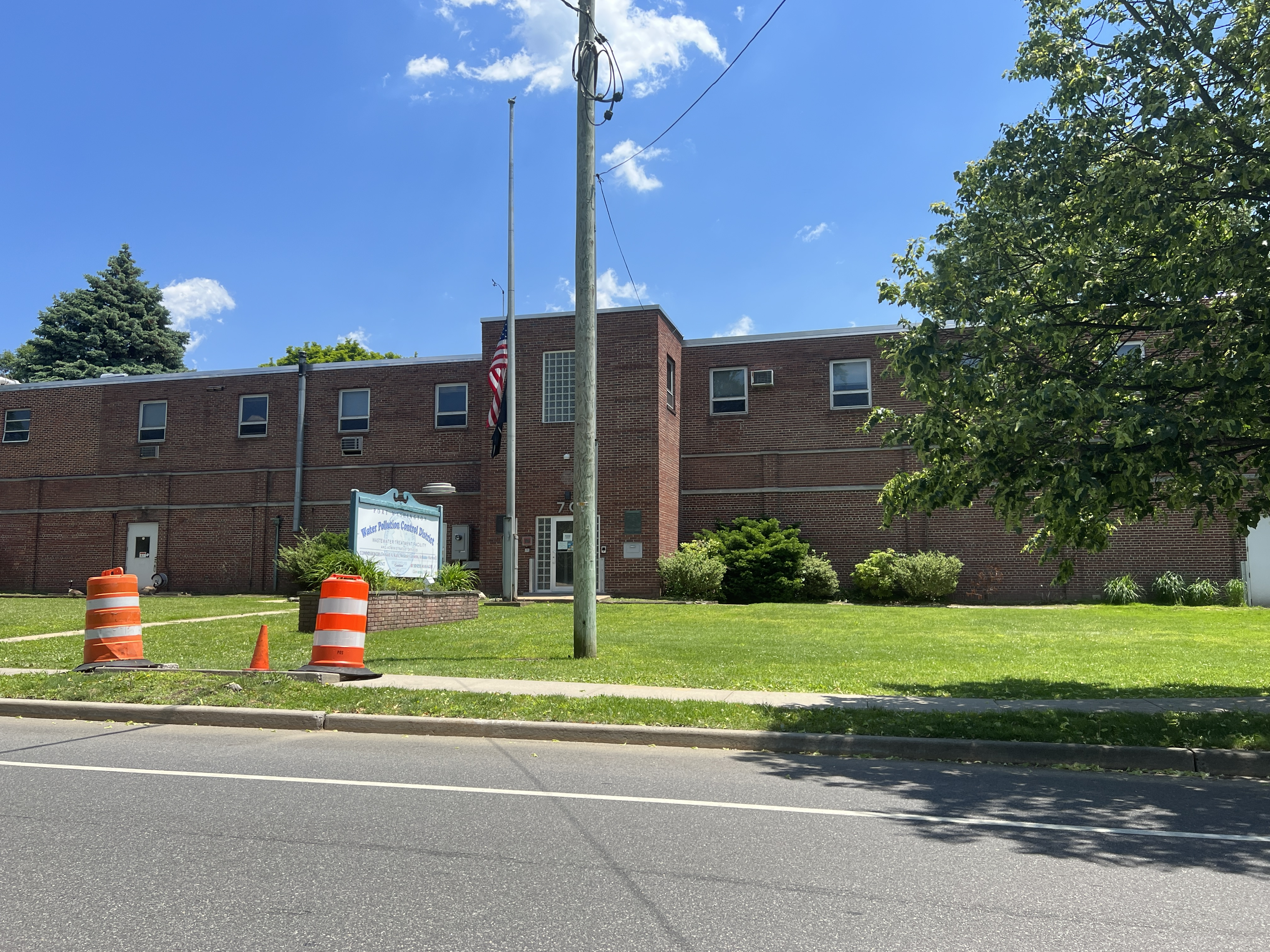
- The district's headquarters in June 2022

District overview
- Formed: 1915
- Type: Sewage treatment
- Status: Active
- Headquarters: 70 Harbor Road, Port Washington, NY 11050; 40°50′21″N 73°41′49″W
- District executive: Windsor J. Kinney, Superintendent
- Website: www.pwwpcd.us

The Port Washington Water Pollution Control District (abbreviated as PWWPCD and colloquially known as the Port Washington Sewer District) is a public sewer district in Nassau County, on the North Shore of Long Island, in New York, United States.

== Description ==
The Port Washington Water Pollution Control District was established in 1915, and serves large portions of the Greater Port Washington area, located on Long Island's Cow Neck Peninsula. The district treats the sanitary sewage from all sewered areas of the peninsula within its boundaries – as well as of that from the Village of Manorhaven's municipal sanitary sewer system, under contract – at its wastewater treatment plant in the hamlet of Port Washington. Upon being treated at the district's plant, the treated wastewater is released into Manhasset Bay.

As of 2025, more than 28,000 residents and business throughout the Greater Port Washington area are served by the district.

The district also owns and operates Sunset Park – a major park facility along Manhasset Bay in the hamlet of Port Washington and the Village of Baxter Estates; a sewage pump station is also located within the park.

=== Communities served ===
- Baxter Estates (partial service)
- Flower Hill (partial service)
- Manorhaven (under contract; the PWWPCD treats sewage conveyed by the village from that village's sanitary sewage collection system, via an interconnection)
- Port Washington
- Port Washington North

== History ==
The Port Washington Water Pollution Control District was established in 1915, in order to better treat the sanitary sewage produced in the growing Port Washington area and mitigate the risk of sewage polluting the environment. In 1916, it built its first treatment plant – surrounded by a new district-owned park open to the public – on a site along Manhasset Bay, signing a 99-year lease with the Town of North Hempstead for the property. Much of the facility and parkland were constructed on landfill over the bay, extending out into the existing cove, with new bulkheads being installed along the waterfront.

Over the decades following its establishment, the district would be expanded as new developments were built or as requested by residents in areas without sewers. One such extension took place in the 1950s, shortly after the construction of the New Salem and Westgate sections of Port Washington.

In 1931, the Port Washington Water Pollution Control District acquired a significant amount of the property consisting of Sunset Park, located in the heart of Port Washington. The park is owned and operated by the district.

In 1968, the Port Washington Water Pollution Control District received funds from New York to upgrade and expand its sewage pumping station. The grant, worth $361,218 (1968 USD), was part of the Pure Waters program.

In 2016, a $450,000 grant from New York was secured for connecting the North Hempstead Beach Park's sewer system to the sewer system operated by the Port Washington Water Pollution Control District. At the time the $1.8 million project was announced, the park's sewer system was in poor condition and was over 40 years old.

In 2023, the Port Washington Water Pollution Control District and the Port Washington Water District announced a partnership in implementing an initiative which plans to save roughly 625,000 gallons of water annually within their boundaries.

In 2025, then-district commissioner Brandon Kurz was suspected of a conflict-of-interest by the district's ethics counsel and by the other commissioners, due to him also being the executive director of the Port Washington Police Activity League, which plays at the district-operated Sunset Park; Kurz subsequently stepped down from his paid position with the PAL that July, but remained in the role as a volunteer and did not provide the proof requested that there was no ongoing financial conflict. However, Kurz also made public allegations that the district was again negotiating to transfer the park to the town, and further falsely alleged that the PAL's ability to play at the park was at risk; there was a board resolution that August to seek a nonprofit – a bid open to the PAL – to pay rent and operate the ballfields on the district's behalf. The RFP resolution came after the revocation of a contract, on the basis of ethics concerns, that had given Kurz exclusive control over the park's youth athletic programs. In light of this – and after Kurz launched a petition to stop what he claimed was a proposed transfer to the town, the other sewer commissioners, the district's counsel, and Town of North Hempstead officials reiterated that there were no renewed plans to transfer or sell the park, and that the negotiations on the matter ceased in 2023; no sale negotiations had occurred since. The controversy led to reprimands against Kurz for misconduct. The controversy also coincided with Kurz being challenged in that autumn's district elections, in which he was defeated by Joseph D'Alonzo; D'Alonzo received 947 votes, while Kurz received 303. That same month, the district again reiterated has it has no renewed interest in selling the park.

== Statistics ==
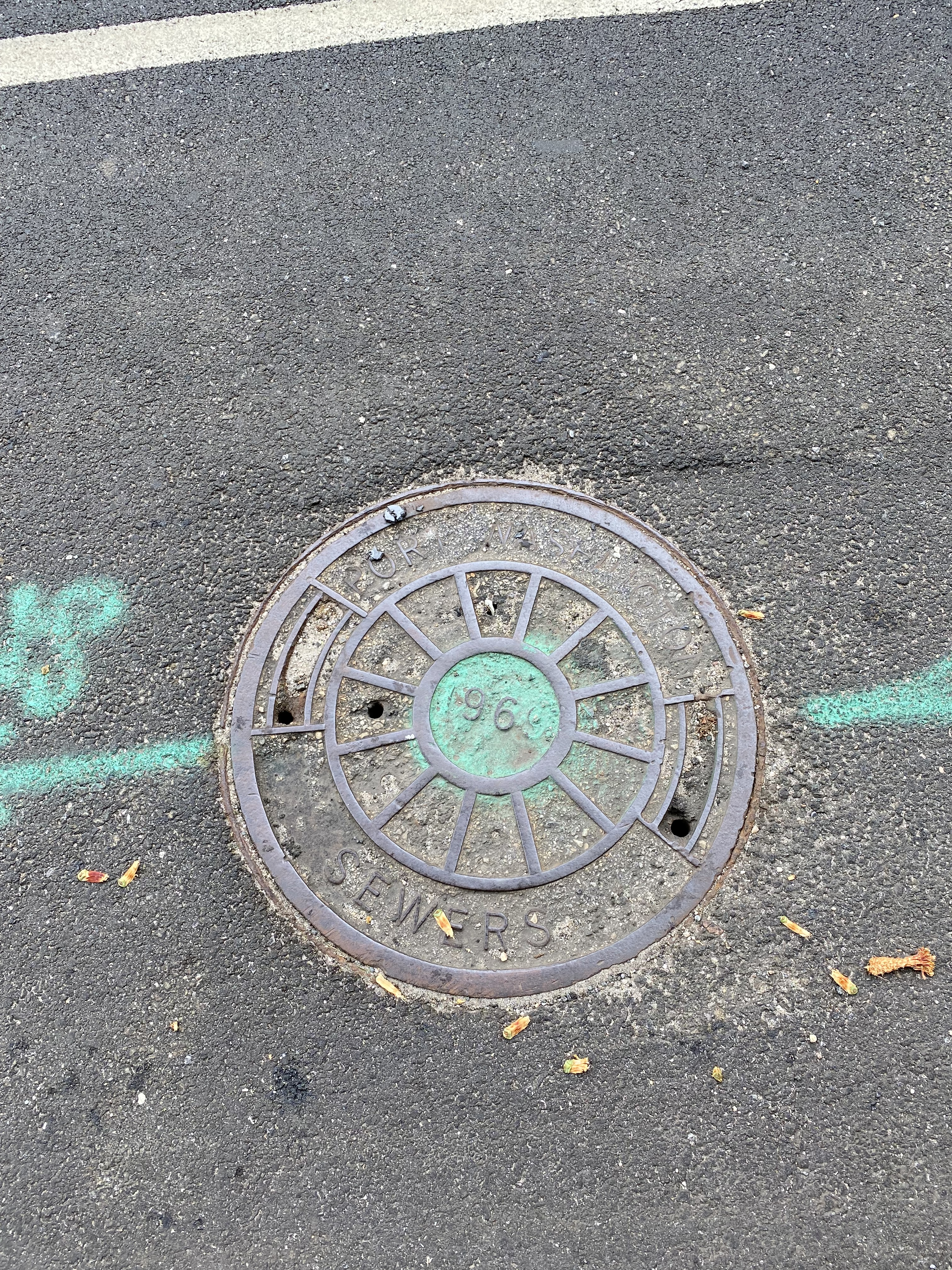
A PWWPCD manhole cover on Port Washington Boulevard in Flower Hill

- Sewer network length: approximately 75 miles (121 km).
- Sewer network type: gravity-based; activated sludge.
- Number of pumping stations: 17.
- Plant design capacity: 4.0 million gallons/day.
- Notable users: Notable non-residential users include the Pall Corporation Headquarters in Port Washington and St. Francis Hospital in Flower Hill.

Additionally, the Port Washington Water Pollution Control District is entirely separate – and disconnected – from the Nassau County Sewage District's sanitary sewer system.

== Administration ==
Being a special tax district, the Port Washington Water Pollution Control District is governed by a board of commissioners, consisting of a superintendent and elected commissioners; commissioners are elected to three-year terms, and the elections are staggered.

As of December 2025, the Superintendent of the Port Washington Water Pollution Control District is Windsor "Win" J. Kinney, and the Board of Commissioners consists of Brandon Kurz, Melanie Cassens, and Arduino "Eddy" Marinelli.

== See also ==
- Special districts in New York (state)
- Port Washington Water District
- Port Washington Police District
