= Jennifer DeSena =

American attorney and politician (born 1969)

Jennifer S. DeSena
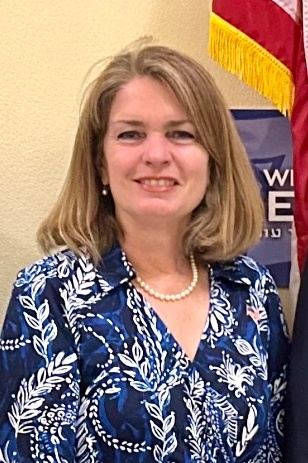
- DeSena in 2024

38th Town Supervisor of North Hempstead, New York
- Incumbent
- Assumed office January 1, 2022
- Preceded by: Judi Bosworth

Personal details
- Born: March 12, 1969 (age 57) The Bronx, New York, U.S.
- Spouse: Ralph DeSena
- Children: 2
- Education: Massapequa High School; Boston College; St. John's University School of Law (JD)

Jennifer DeSena (born March 12, 1969) is an American attorney and politician serving as the 38th Town Supervisor of North Hempstead, in Nassau County, New York, in the United States.

== Early life and education ==
DeSena was born on March 12, 1969, in the New York City borough of the Bronx. She moved to Massapequa, New York when she was two, and was raised there for the rest of her childhood, eventually graduating from Massapequa High School. She attended Boston College, where she earned her bachelor's degree, majoring in economics and English. She then attended the St. John's University School of Law, where she earned her Juris Doctor degree. She then began practicing litigation law, before serving as a Securities and Exchange Commission enforcement attorney in Manhattan.

== Political career ==
DeSena began her political career in 2021, when she ran for Town Supervisor upon the retirement of then-incumbent Judi Bosworth (D–Great Neck). DeSena won the election over her opponent, then-Town Clerk Wayne H. Wink Jr. (D–Roslyn). DeSena, a registered Democrat, ran on the Republican and Conservative tickets, and her 2021 victory marked the first time in over three decades that a Republican-backed candidate won the position.

DeSena was re-elected to a second term in November 2023, defeating her Democrat-backed opponent, former Town Supervisor Jon Kaiman, in a landslide victory. In November 2025, DeSena was re-elected to a third term, defeating Democratic challenger Dave Kerpen, an entrepreneur and author from Port Washington.

As Town Supervisor, DeSena has advocated for ending partisan politics in North Hempstead, reforming and improving the Town's building department, installing sanitary sewers along Plandome Road's business district in Manhasset, and improving services and maintaining the quality of life for residents. She has advocated against policies proposed by state lawmakers – including Governor Kathleen Hochul's attempts at overriding local control of zoning and cutting funds for schools, citing the unintended consequences from such policies, which would negatively impact the community and the environment.

DeSena was also vocally against George Santos, following the news being made known of his scandals, and called for him to resign. Although she initially endorsed him in the election before his scandals were known, she became one of the first Republican politicians in the district to publicly denounce and condemn him after the allegations were confirmed; DeSena publicly rescinded her endorsement of him and expressed her anger, stating how she and many others were betrayed and deceived by Santos, and condemning him for his lies about being Jewish and exploiting the Holocaust. DeSena banned him from North Hempstead events and was one of several Republican leaders who were vocally against him serving in Congress.

== Personal life ==
DeSena resides in the Strathmore section of Manhasset, New York, having moved there with her husband, Ralph, in 2000; her husband is also an attorney. She and her husband have two children.

Prior to being elected as Town Supervisor, DeSena had long been heavily involved in Manhasset's civic associations and with other local community organizations in the area. She also lead the Manhasset Coalition Against Substance Abuse and was the President of the Women's Club of Strathmore, Manhasset's North Strathmore Civic Association.

== See also ==
- May W. Newburger, a previous North Hempstead Town Supervisor
- Norman Penny
- Michael J. Tully Jr.
