= Henry Aspinwall =

Architect, World War I veteran, and politician (1895–1979)

Henry Titus Aspinwall

Village Trustee of Baxter Estates, New York
- In office 1941–1958

Personal details
- Born: September 15, 1895 Pittsburgh, Allegheny County, Pennsylvania
- Died: May 18, 1979 (aged 83) Seattle, King County, Washington
- Spouse: Winifred Cramp (m. 1923)
- Relations: William Henry Aspinwall (great-grandfather); Lloyd Aspinwall (granduncle)
- Children: 2
- Education: Carnegie Mellon University
- Occupation: Architect, politician

Henry Aspinwall (September 15, 1895 – May 18, 1979) was an American World War I veteran, politician, and architect, best known for his work in the New York metropolitan area.

== Biography ==
=== Early life ===
Henry Aspinwall was born on September 15, 1895, in Pittsburgh, Allegheny County, Pennsylvania, to Louis Miniturn Aspinwall – the grandson of businessman William Henry Aspinwall.

During World War I, Aspinwall served in the United States Armed Forces, as a Second Lieutenant in the 26th Division, stationed in France. Subsequently, he attended Carnegie Mellon University, graduating in 1921.

In 1923, Aspinwall married Winifred Cramp, and the couple relocated to West Virginia, before moving again – this time to Port Washington, New York – circa 1926.

=== Career ===
==== Architectural career ====
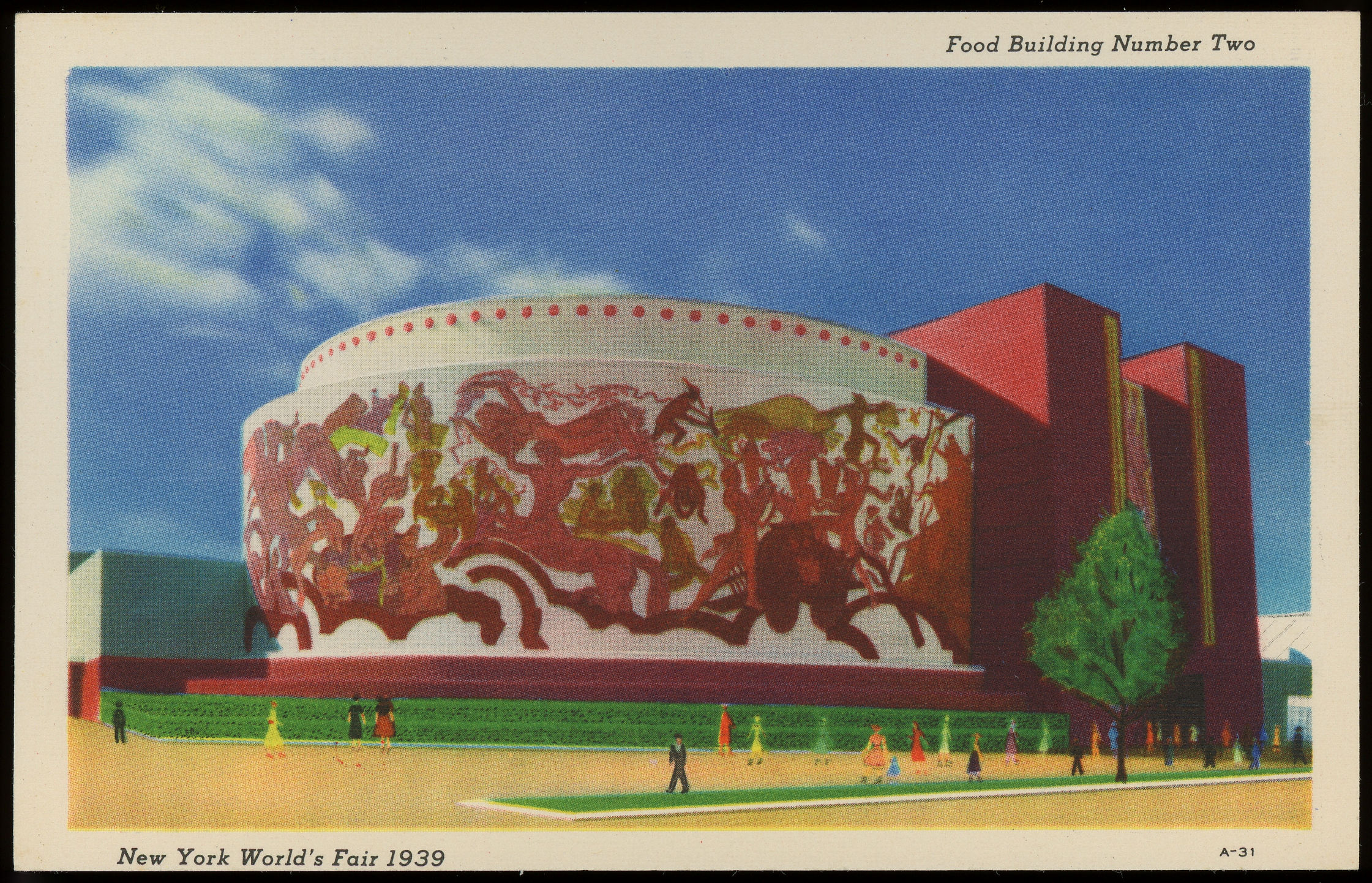
Postcard of the Aspinwall-designed Food Building Number 2, from the 1939 New York World's Fair

Upon moving to New York, Aspinwall began working as an architect as a sole practitioner. By the early 1930s, Aspinwall met fellow architect Paul F. Simpson. Together, they formed a Great Neck, New York-based partnership, Aspinwall & Simpson in 1935, with offices at South Station Plaza in Great Neck Plaza. Through their firm, Aspinwall was responsible for designing several residential homes and apartments, factory buildings, car dealerships and other businesses, and other structures throughout the New York metropolitan area – including for the 1939 New York World's Fair, in collaboration with M. W. Del Gaudio. The firm, furthermore, designed several homes in and around the Nassau County communities of Flower Hill, Munsey Park, Roslyn Estates, and Russell Gardens – and across the Port Washington and Great Neck peninsulas – during this era, on Long Island's North Shore. Aspinwall, through this partnership, also worked with major local developers of the era, such as the Callan Brothers, in designing the homes for large-scale developments, including the Callan-developed Wyngate section of Great Neck. Other major developments for which he was responsible for designing the homes was Broadlawn Harbour in Kings Point, New York.

Following the 1941 dissolution of his partnership with Simpson, Aspinwall formed the Port Washington, New York-based firm of Henry T. Aspinwall and Associates. During this time, Aspinwall's firm designed various residential, commercial, and civic buildings – including the John Philip Sousa Memorial Bandshell and the North Hempstead Town Dock Administration Building in Port Washington, and the swimming pavilion and facilities at Manorhaven Beach Park in Manorhaven, New York. Aspinwall and his firm additionally designed structures for the 1964 New York World's Fair.

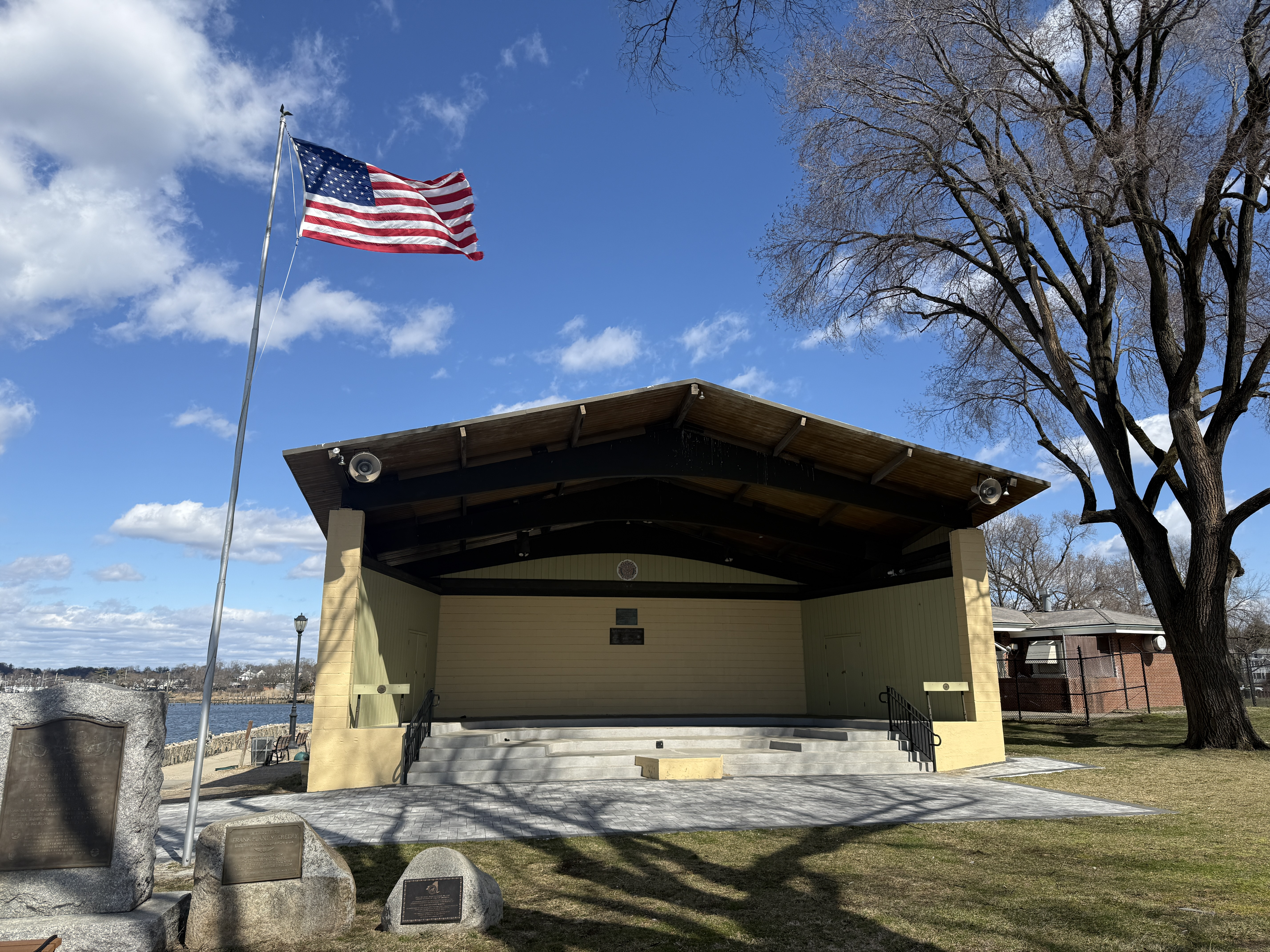
The Sousa Bandshell in 2026

A number of structures designed by Aspinwall have been designated as historic landmarks – including various residences in the Addisleigh Park Historic District in Queens, New York City.

Aspinwall also served for a number of years as the Building Inspector of the Village of Russell Gardens.

==== Public service ====
In addition to his work as an architect, Aspinwall was a local politician, serving as a Village Trustee in the Village of Baxter Estates, New York, where he resided. He held this office for 17 years, between 1941 and 1958, when he retired from that position.

=== Later life ===
In 1969, Aspinwall retired as an architect and moved to Seattle, Washington, where he would live for the rest of his life. Aspinwall Associates continued to operate, with his practice's partners, Eugene Gerbereux and Joseph E. Hnatov, subsequently talking over.

=== Death ===
Aspinwall died on May 18, 1979, in Seattle, Washington, following an illness. He was aged 83.

=== Personal life ===
For most of his adult life, Aspinwall resided on North Washington Street in the Village of Baxter Estates, near Port Washington, New York, prior to moving to Seattle.

Aspinwall was married to Winifred Cramp. They had two children and several grandchildren. One of his sons, Peter Grosvenor Aspinwall, died in battle in World War II. The couple were longtime members of St. Stephen's Episcopal Church in Port Washington.

== Notable projects ==
- Food Building No. 2, 1939 New York World's Fair (Queens, New York City)
- Manorhaven Beach Park Pavilions (Manorhaven, New York)
- Sands Point Village Hall (Sands Point, New York)

== See also ==
- William Landsberg
- Addison Mizner
