= Hillside Manor, New York =

- Hamlet
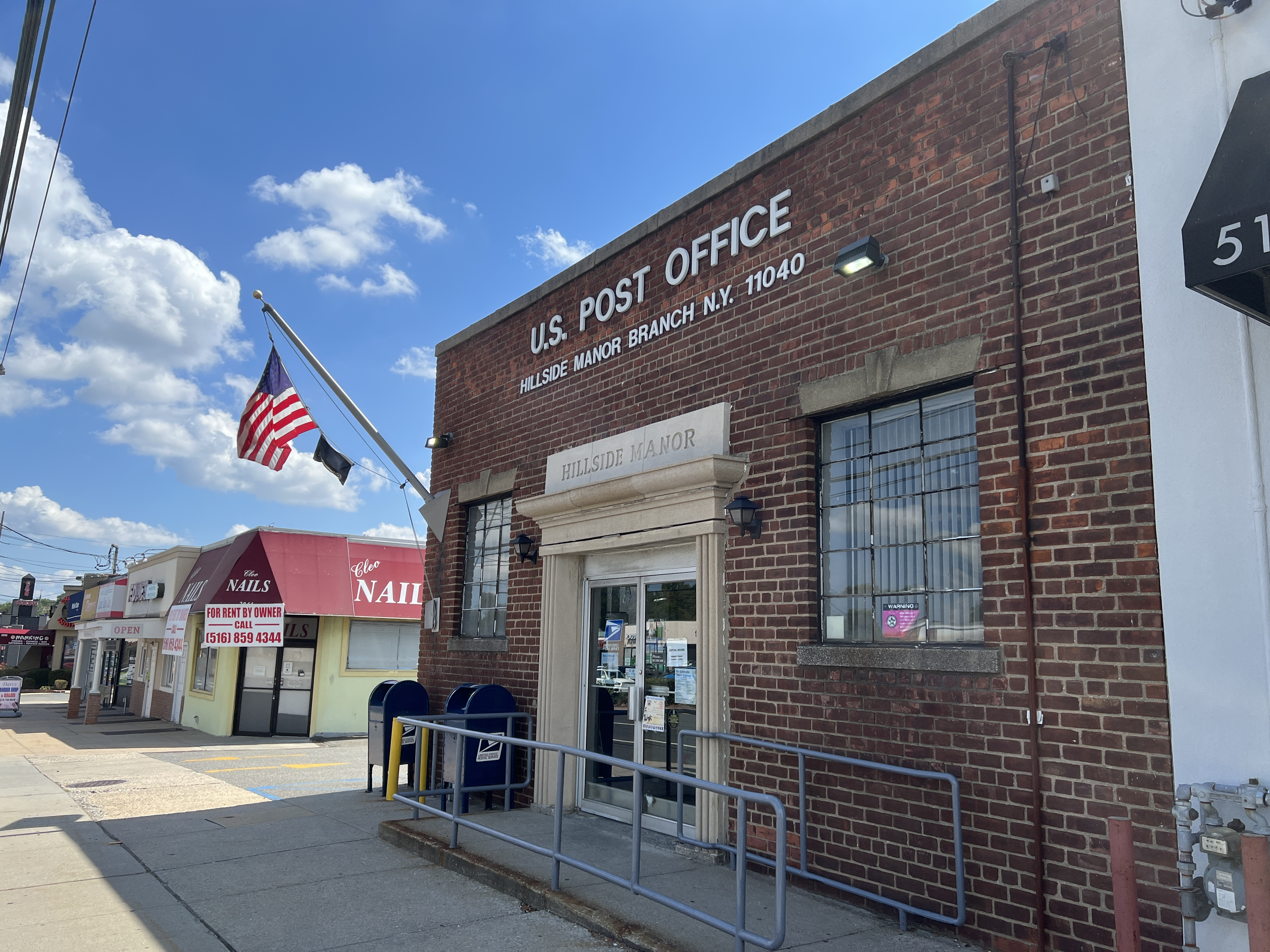
- The Hillside Manor Branch Post Office in 2022

- Location on Long Island Location within the state of New York
- Coordinates: 40°45′1.37″N 73°40′22.37″W
- Country: United States
- State: New York
- County: Nassau
- Town: North Hempstead
- Demonym: Manorite
- Time zone: UTC−5 (Eastern (EST))
  - Summer (DST): UTC−4 (EDT)
- Zip Code: 11040
- Area codes: 516, 363
- FIPS code: 36059
- GNIS feature ID: 971935

Hillside Manor is an unincorporated hamlet in the Town of North Hempstead in Nassau County, on Long Island, in New York, United States, within the census-designated place (CDP) of Garden City Park.

Although presently considered part of the Garden City Park CDP, the name continues to be widely used and accepted both socially and politically – most notably by the Hillside Manor Post Office.

== History ==
The name Hillside Manor was chosen as the name of the hamlet by residents in 1946 when proposing names for a new post office to be located within the hamlet.

On December 1, 1948, the Hillside Manor Post Office opened, functioning as a branch of the New Hyde Park Post Office. At the time, there were approximately 9,000 people residing in Hillside Manor. When the post office was first unveiled in November 1948, the stone nameplate on the building erroneously said "Garden City Park" due to an error on the blueprints, causing a massive uproar from local residents as well as from the press; the engraving on the nameplate was soon corrected to display the name "Hillside Manor."

== Geography ==
According to the United States Geological Survey, Hillside Manor has an elevation of 98 feet (30 m).

Hillside Manor is located within the Garden City Park CDP.

== See also ==
- Strathmore, New York – Another non-CDP hamlet in North Hempstead.
