= Sunset Park (Port Washington, New York) =

Public park in New York, United States

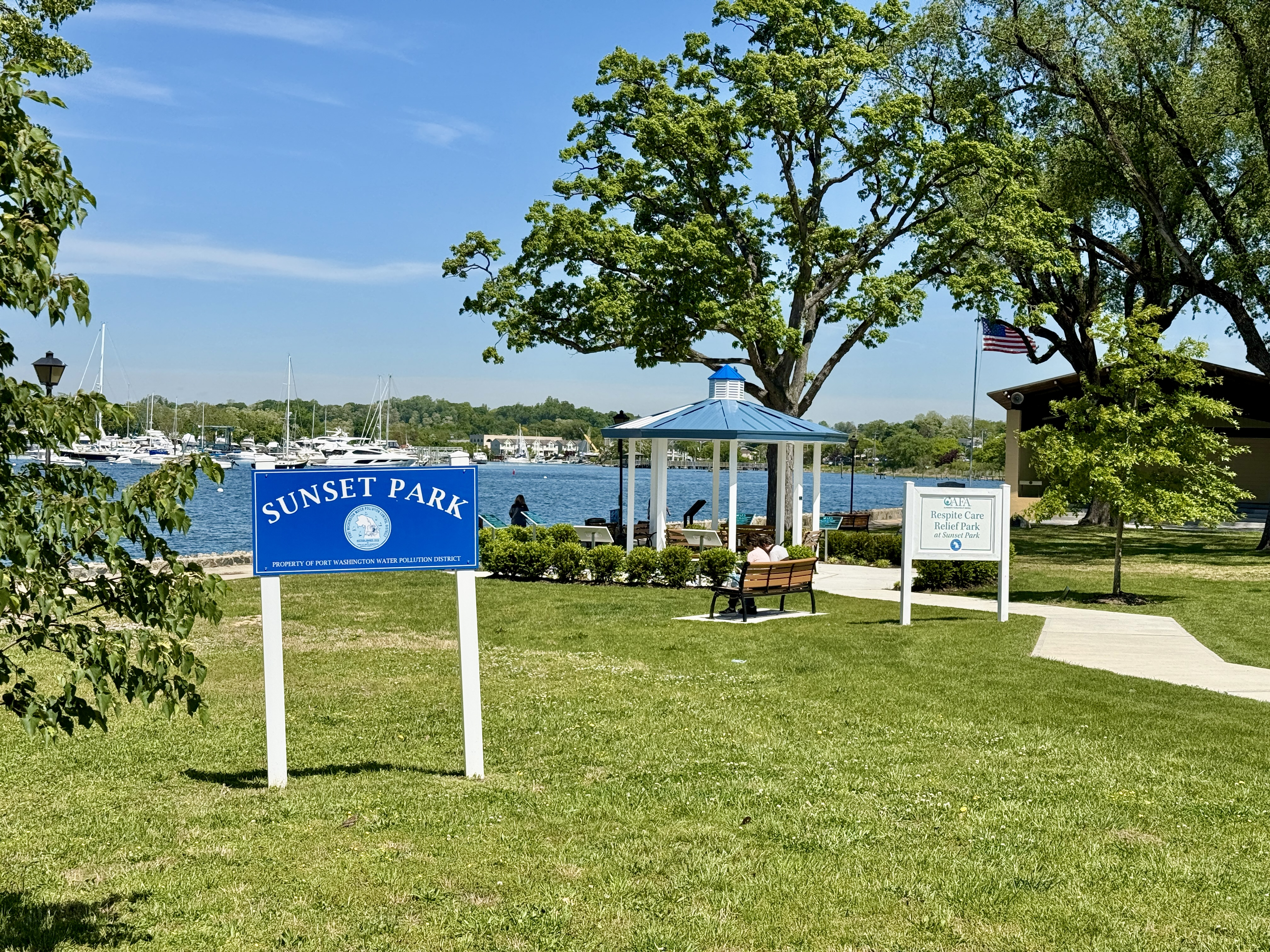
- Sunset Park in 2026, as seen from Main Street
- Interactive map of Sunset Park
- Location: Port Washington and Baxter Estates, New York, United States
- Area: 5.2 acres (2.1 ha)
- Opened: 1916
- Founder: 40°49′58″N 73°42′4″W
- Owner: Port Washington Water Pollution Control District
- Operator: Port Washington Water Pollution Control District

Sunset Park is a major park owned by the Port Washington Water Pollution Control District, located within both the hamlet of Port Washington and the Village of Baxter Estates in Nassau County, on Long Island, in New York, United States.

== Description ==
Sunset Park is located along Manhasset Bay (which forms its northern and western boundaries), and is bordered to its south and east by Main Street and Shore Road (CR E25), respectively. The park, additionally, is adjoined to its south by the North Hempstead Town Dock.

The park is owned and operated by the Port Washington Water Pollution Control District, which also operates a sewage pump station in the park. It has a total area of 5.2 acres (2.1 ha).

Sunset Park contains ballfields, multiple memorials, a waterfront promenade, the John Philip Sousa Memorial Bandshell, and the former headquarters of the Port Washington Police Athletic League.

== History ==
In 1915, the Port Washington Water Pollution Control District was created. That November, it was announced that this new district would construct its first treatment plant on a site along Manhasset Bay, between the North Hempstead Town Dock and the property of Mary Baxter along Main Street, signing a 99-year lease with the Town of North Hempstead for the property. As part of this agreement, a new public park facility on the plant's grounds, surrounding the plant and along the waterfront – to eventually become known as Sunset Park – was to be constructed and operated by the district; these facilities were built in 1916. Much of the parkland – and the plant facilities – were constructed on landfill over the bay, extending out into the existing cove, with new bulkheads being installed along the waterfront.

In 1967, the John Philip Sousa Memorial Bandshell – a major, outdoor performing arts venue at the park – was formally dedicated. Its erection was the product of a fundraising campaign executed by the local chapter of the American Legion and its auxiliaries starting in 1963, who wished to create a performing arts venue there in honor of the late composer and Port Washington resident.

In the early 2020s, concerns arose over a plan for a potential sale of the park to the Alzheimer's Foundation of America. However, these plans never materialized, due to community opposition to any sale – including from the Town of North Hempstead, which repeatedly insisted that the park is to remain public. The Port Washington Water Pollution Control District had also considered offering the park to the Town of North Hempstead, but town officials expressed no interest in a transfer, leading to the district ending all sale negotiations and continuing to operate the park.

In 2025, a controversy arose, in which then-district commissioner Brandon Kurz was suspected of a conflict-of-interest by the district's ethics counsel and by the other commissioners, given that he was also the executive director of the Port Washington Police Activity League, which plays at the park; Kurz subsequently stepped down from his paid position with the PAL that July, but remained in the role as a volunteer and did not provide the proof requested that there was no ongoing financial conflict. However, Kurz also made public allegations that the district was again negotiating to transfer the park to the town, and further falsely alleged that the PAL's ability to play at the park was at risk; there was a board resolution that August to seek a nonprofit – a bid open to the PAL – to pay rent and operate the ballfields on the district's behalf. The RFP resolution came after the revocation of a contract, on the basis of ethics concerns, that had given Kurz exclusive control over the park's youth athletic programs. In light of this – and after Kurz launched a petition to stop what he claimed was a proposed transfer to the town, the other sewer commissioners, the district's counsel, and Town of North Hempstead officials reiterated that there were no renewed plans to transfer or sell the park, and that the negotiations on the matter ceased in 2023; no sale negotiations had occurred since. The controversy led to reprimands against Kurz for misconduct. The controversy also coincided with Kurz being challenged in that autumn's district elections, in which he was defeated by Joseph D'Alonzo; D'Alonzo received 947 votes, while Kurz received 303. That same month, the district again reiterated has it has no renewed interest in selling the park.

2025 also saw the opening of a new educational and recreational space at the park. Constructed in a partnership between the district and the Alzheimer's Foundation of America, the new space includes a gazebo, walking paths, benches, landscaping, and educational displays on Alzheimer's and how to help support individuals with the illness. A formal ribbon-cutting ceremony occurred that October.

=== Etymology ===
Sunset Park's name was chosen due to its westerly, shorefront location providing for good views of the sunset.

== John Philip Sousa Memorial Bandshell ==
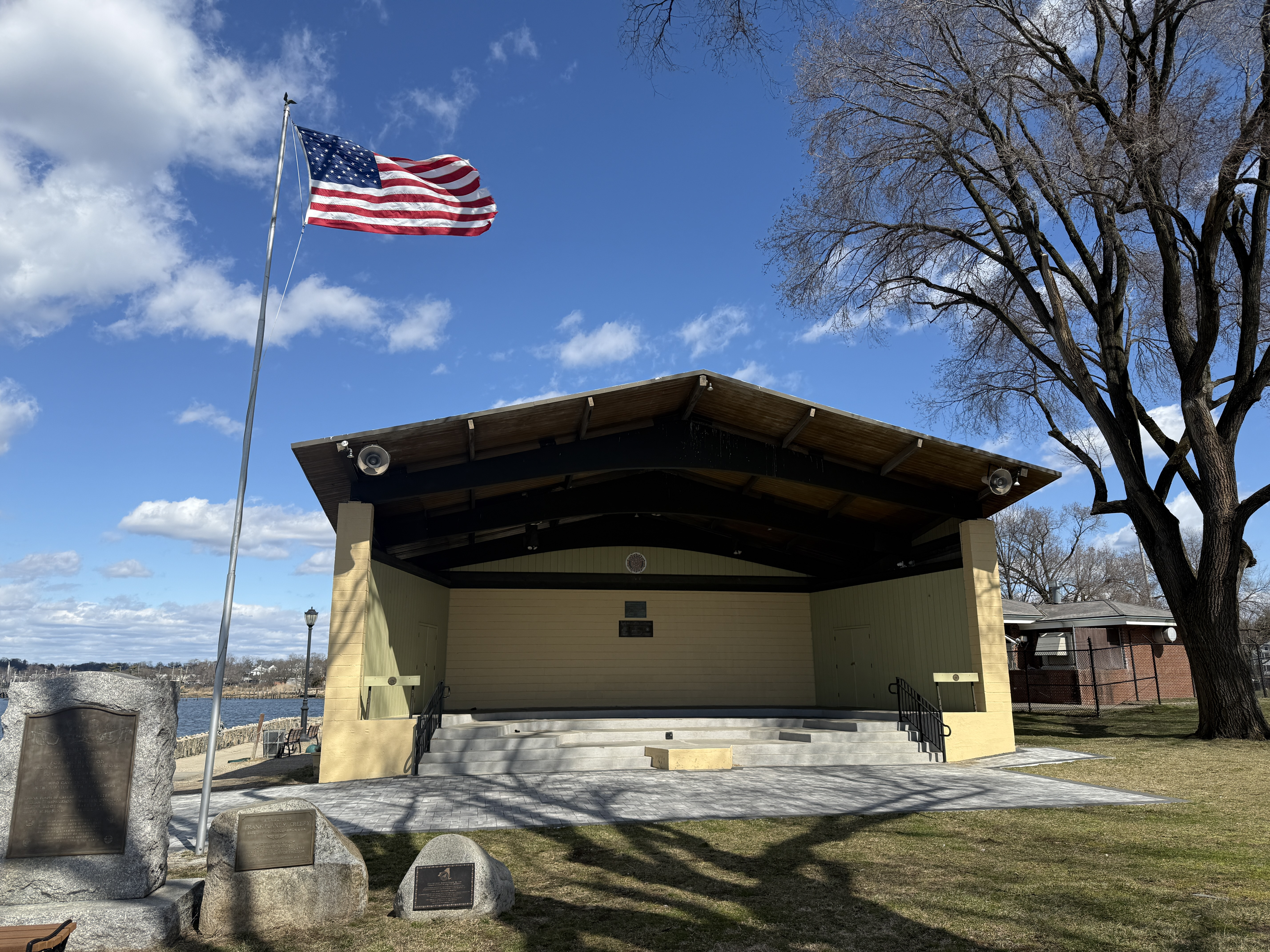
The Sousa Bandshell in 2026

The John Philip Sousa Memorial Bandshell is a bandshell and memorial located within Sunset Park in Port Washington, New York, United States.

=== Description ===
Constructed in the 1960s and designed by Port Washington-based architect Joseph Hnatov, the Sousa Memorial Bandshell was constructed to provide the Greater Port Washington area with an outdoor performing arts venue and to serve as a memorial to American composer and longtime Port Washington resident John Philip Sousa; Sousa resided at his estate in what would become the Village of Sands Point.

During the facility's planning, several sites were considered. Ultimately, the waterfront location in Sunset Park was selected as the winning location.

The bandshell was formally dedicated on June 11, 1967, sponsored by the local chapter of the American Legion and with funds raised by it and local residents. The Sousa Memorial Bandshell – overseen by Sousa Bandshell Committee – curates a series of free concerts each summer, which are open to the general public. Additionally, the committee and the Port Washington Public Library, furthermore, partner to create a separate, annual concert series at the Sousa Bandshell.

== See also ==
- Manorhaven Beach Park
- North Hempstead Beach Park
