= Port Washington North, New York =

- Village
- Incorporated Village of Port Washington North
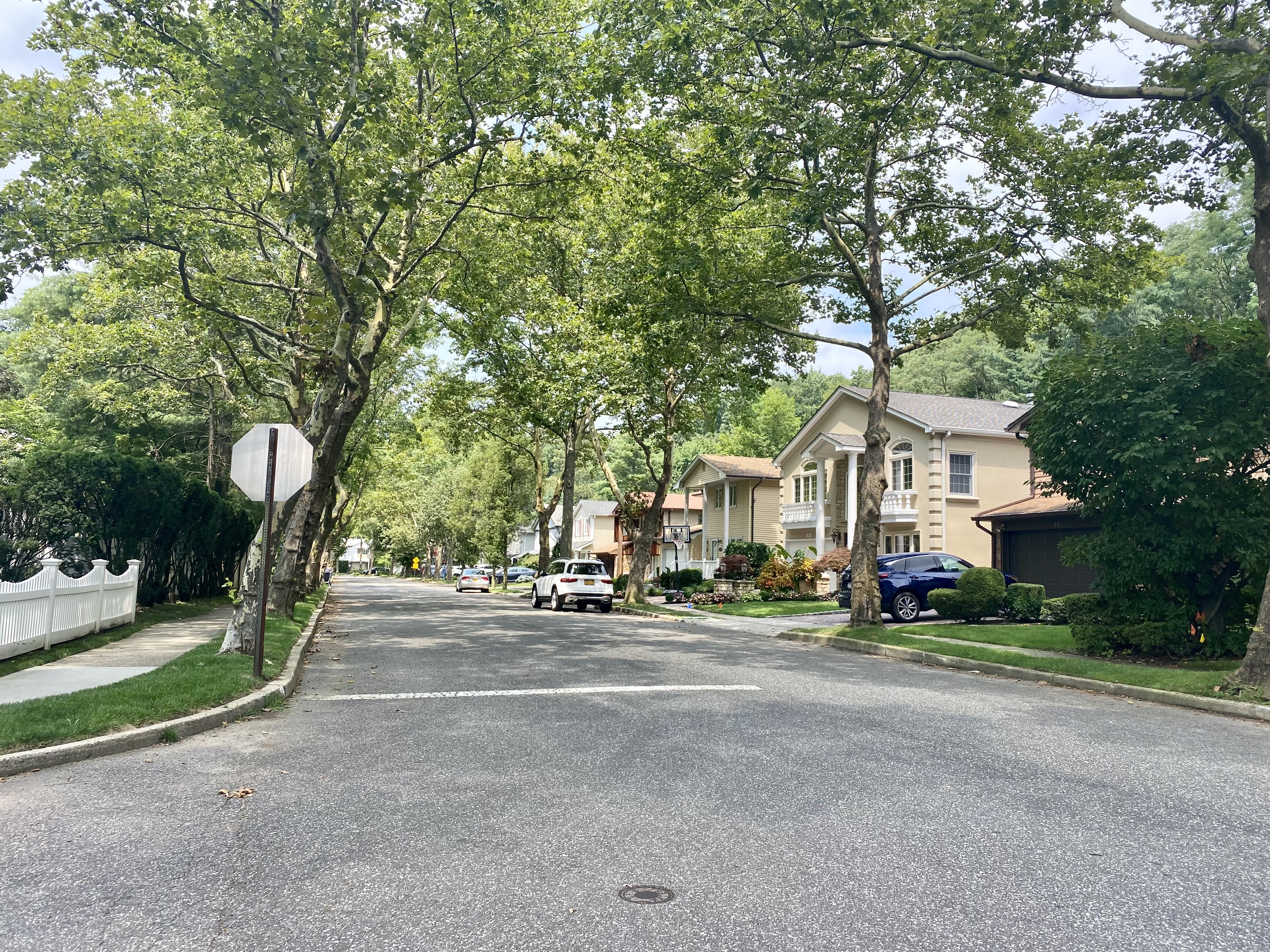
- Soundview Drive in the Soundview Village section of Port Washington North in 2021

- Official Emblem of Port Washington North
- Nicknames: Port North, Soundview, VOPN
- Location in Nassau County and the state of New York

- Location on Long Island Location within the state of New York
- Coordinates: 40°50′41″N 73°42′7″W
- Country: United States
- State: New York
- County: Nassau
- Town: North Hempstead
- Incorporated: May 16, 1932
- Founder: John Cocks
- Named for: Its geographic location north of Port Washington

Government
  - Mayor: Robert S. Weitzner
  - Trustees: List of Trustees: • Steven Cohen; • Matthew Kepke; • Michael Malatino; • Andrea Scheff

Area
  - Total: 0.50 sq mi (1.29 km^{2})
  - Land: 0.48 sq mi (1.24 km^{2})
  - Water: 0.019 sq mi (0.05 km^{2})
- Elevation: 26 ft (8 m)

Population (2020)
  - Total: 3,160
  - Density: 6,602.7/sq mi (2,549.32/km^{2})
- Demonym(s): Port Northern; Port Washingtonian
- Time zone: UTC-5 (Eastern (EST))
  - Summer (DST): UTC-4 (EDT)
- ZIP Code: 11050 (Port Washington)
- Area codes: 516, 363
- FIPS code: 36-59531
- GNIS feature ID: 0960980
- Website: portwashingtonnorth.gov

Port Washington North is a village in Nassau County, on the North Shore of Long Island, in New York, United States. It is considered part of the Greater Port Washington area, which is anchored by Port Washington. The population was 3,160 at the time of the 2020 census.

The Incorporated Village of Port Washington North is located on the Cow Neck Peninsula and is the youngest village in the Town of North Hempstead.

== History ==
The area now consisting of the Port Washington North was initially settled by European colonists – mainly Dutchmen and Englishmen – in 1644, after they purchased land from the people of the Matinecock Nation.

Port Washington North incorporated on May 16, 1932, after residents of the area unanimously voted in favor of incorporating that year. In doing so, it became the youngest village in North Hempstead – a title it retains. Its first Mayor, John Cocks, led the movement to incorporate; he was elected on August 2, 1932.

In 1931, one year prior to the incorporation of Port Washington North as a village, the adjacent village, Manorhaven, unsuccessfully attempted to annex the area – in addition to both the Port Washington Terrace neighborhood and what is now the Morewood Oaks neighborhood in unincorporated Port Washington. Manorhaven's annexation bid was unsuccessful due to legal disputes and how the residents in what would ultimately become Port Washington North preferred to incorporate as a separate village. When Port Washington North incorporated one year later, in 1932, the new village's territory effectively separated the two unincorporated areas – excluded from the territory of the newly-incorporated village of Port Washington North – from the rest of unincorporated Port Washington, in turn creating two exclaves.

In 1944, Nassau County announced that it would reconstruct Shore Road through the village, widening it to 70 feet (21 m) and eliminating dangerous curves. The project involved the use of eminent domain, and some structures – including the historic, 1890-built Gildo's Hotel at the corner of Shore Road and Mill Pond Drive – were moved further back to accommodate the widened road while ensuring the structure's preservation.

In 1952, after holding a one regular board meeting per year for two decades, the Board of Trustees – the village's governing body – began holding its regular meetings once each month. One year later, in 1953, the village annexed an uninhabited area occupied by a sand mine along Cow Neck Road.

By the late 1950s, the Colonial Sand and Gravel Company began selling tracts of their land to developers. In 1959, approval was given by the village for developers to begin constructing the first section of Port Washington North's Soundview Village subdivision.

In 1973, after the village enacted a landmarks preservation ordinance and established a landmarks preservation commission, the Mill Pond Historic District was officially created by the village. This historic district is located along Mill Pond Road, overlooking Mill Pond.

On May 16, 1982, the Village of Port Washington North celebrated its 50th anniversary. In honor of the occasion, village officials officially designated eleven historical sites within the village as Village of Port Washington North Historic Landmarks.

In 2005, the Port Washington North Village Justice Court was established.

=== Etymology ===
The name of the village reflects its geographic location in the northern part of the Greater Port Washington area. Furthermore, the village's name reflects its location north of downtown Port Washington.

== Geography ==
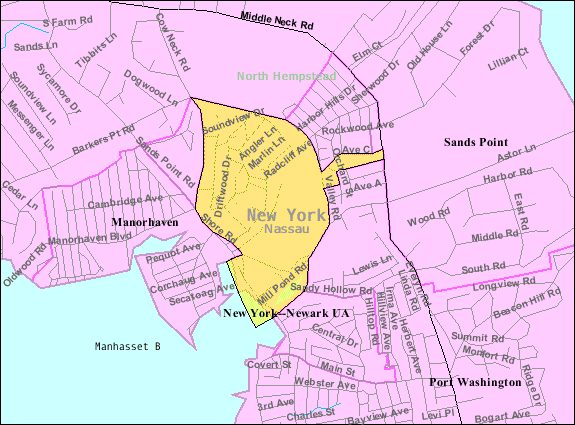
U.S. Census map of Port Washington North

According to the United States Census Bureau, the village has a total area of 0.5 square miles (1.3 km^{2}), of which 0.5 square miles (1.3 km^{2}) is land and 0.04 square miles (0.10 km^{2}), or 4.00%, is water.

Additionally, Port Washington North is located on the northern half of the Cow Neck Peninsula.

Port Washington North is located within the Manhasset Bay Watershed, which in turn is located within the larger Long Island Sound/Atlantic Ocean Watershed.

=== Topography ===
Like the rest of Long Island's North Shore, Port Washington North is situated on a terminal moraine, known as the Harbor Hill Moraine. This moraine was formed by glaciers during the Wisconsin Glacial Episode, and is named for Harbor Hill in Roslyn; Harbor Hill is the highest geographic point in Nassau County.

According to the United States Environmental Protection Agency and the United States Geological Survey, the highest point in Port Washington North is located at the Port Washington North–Sands Point border on Middle Neck Road, at approximately 100–110 feet (30–34 m), and the lowest point is Manhasset Bay, which is at sea level.

=== Land use and zoning ===
The housing stock in the village is diverse, with a mixture of single-family, multifamily, and townhome-type housing. The majority of the housing stock is single-family residential. Two garden apartment complexes are located in the Soundview Village section of the village. One townhome-type development is located adjacent to the Stop & Shop Plaza, while another – the gated Mill Pond Acres development – is located towards the east end of the village, and is zoned for residents aged 55 and over.

The industrial areas – officially designated as "Economic Development" and "Maritime Business" districts, consist of light manufacturing, offices, warehouses, and production studios. The waterfront district, meanwhile, consists of the Bay Walk Park and boat launch & docking areas.

The business district consists of several commercial businesses. The district also contains two large shopping centers: the Soundview Marketplace and the Stop & Shop Plaza.

=== Climate ===
Port Washington North has a humid subtropical climate (Cfa), bordering on a hot-summer humid continental climate (Dfa). Average monthly temperatures in the village range from 31.8 °F in January to 75.3 °F in July.

Climate data for Port Washington North, New York, 1991–2020 normals, extremes 1999–present
Month	Jan	Feb	Mar	Apr	May	Jun	Jul	Aug	Sep	Oct	Nov	Dec	Year
Record high °F (°C)	71 (22)	73 (23)	87 (31)	94 (34)	96 (36)	101 (38)	108 (42)	105 (41)	97 (36)	89 (32)	83 (28)	76 (24)	108 (42)
Mean daily maximum °F (°C)	39.8 (4.3)	41.9 (5.5)	48.7 (9.3)	59.7 (15.4)	69.4 (20.8)	78.6 (25.9)	84.0 (28.9)	82.6 (28.1)	76.4 (24.7)	65.2 (18.4)	54.5 (12.5)	45.0 (7.2)	62.2 (16.7)
Daily mean °F (°C)	33.0 (0.6)	34.5 (1.4)	41.0 (5.0)	51.2 (10.7)	60.8 (16.0)	70.2 (21.2)	75.9 (24.4)	74.8 (23.8)	68.3 (20.2)	57.3 (14.1)	47.1 (8.4)	38.6 (3.7)	54.4 (12.5)
Mean daily minimum °F (°C)	26.1 (−3.3)	27.1 (−2.7)	33.2 (0.7)	42.6 (5.9)	52.2 (11.2)	61.8 (16.6)	67.8 (19.9)	66.9 (19.4)	60.3 (15.7)	49.5 (9.7)	39.8 (4.3)	32.1 (0.1)	46.6 (8.1)
Record low °F (°C)	−4 (−20)	−5 (−21)	5 (−15)	13 (−11)	34 (1)	43 (6)	50 (10)	46 (8)	38 (3)	27 (−3)	18 (−8)	−2 (−19)	−5 (−21)
Average precipitation inches (mm)	3.86 (98)	3.06 (78)	4.30 (109)	4.02 (102)	3.75 (95)	4.31 (109)	4.06 (103)	4.33 (110)	4.22 (107)	4.20 (107)	3.42 (87)	4.31 (109)	47.84 (1,214)
Average snowfall inches (cm)	1.85 (4.7)	7.8 (20)	3.7 (9.4)	0.3 (0.76)	0 (0)	0 (0)	0 (0)	0 (0)	0 (0)	0 (0)	0.2 (0.51)	5.7 (14)	19.55 (49.37)
Average relative humidity (%)	73	75	72	72	75	74	73	71	73	73	71	75	73
Average dew point °F (°C)	22.0 (−5.6)	22.3 (−5.4)	27.3 (−2.6)	37.0 (2.8)	48.2 (9.0)	58.9 (14.9)	64.4 (18.0)	64.2 (17.9)	58.1 (14.5)	47.2 (8.4)	36.5 (2.5)	27.9 (−2.3)	42.8 (6.0)
Mean monthly sunshine hours	177	153	172	167	202	213	237	241	215	190	210	171	2,348
Mean daily daylight hours	9.6	10.7	12.0	13.3	14.5	15.1	14.8	13.7	12.4	11.1	9.9	9.3	12.2
Average ultraviolet index	2	2	2	4	5	6	6	6	5	3	2	2	4
Source 1: NOAA, PRISM, The Weather Channel (temperatures, average dew points, and average precipitation)
Source 2: Weather Atlas (all other data)

==== Plant zone ====
According to the United States Department of Agriculture (USDA), the village is located within hardiness zone 7b.

== Demographics ==
Historical population
Census	Pop.	Note	%±
1940	628		—
1950	650		3.5%
1960	722		11.1%
1970	2,883		299.3%
1980	3,147		9.2%
1990	2,736		−13.1%
2000	2,700		−1.3%
2010	3,154		16.8%
2020	3,160		0.2%
U.S. Decennial Census

=== 2020 census ===
As of the 2020 census, Port Washington North had a population of 3,160. The median age was 48.6 years. 20.6% of residents were under the age of 18 and 27.7% were 65 years of age or older. For every 100 females there were 85.4 males, and for every 100 females age 18 and over there were 81.9 males. The population density was 6,502.9 inhabitants per square mile (2,510.8/km^{2}).

100.0% of residents lived in urban areas, while 0.0% lived in rural areas.

There were 1,324 households in the village, of which 28.9% had children under the age of 18. Of all households, 56.6% were married-couple households, 12.2% were households with a male householder and no spouse or partner present, and 28.1% were households with a female householder and no spouse or partner present. About 30.2% of all households were made up of individuals, and 19.2% had someone living alone who was 65 years of age or older.

There were 1,377 housing units, of which 3.8% were vacant. The homeowner vacancy rate was 1.8% and the rental vacancy rate was 1.8%.

Racial composition as of the 2020 census
Race	Number	Percent
White	2,482	78.5%
Black or African American	30	0.9%
American Indian and Alaska Native	44	1.4%
Asian	296	9.4%
Native Hawaiian and Other Pacific Islander	1	0.0%
Some other race	129	4.1%
Two or more races	178	5.6%
Hispanic or Latino (of any race)	297	9.4%

=== Income and poverty ===
The median income for a household in the village was $137,679. The per capita income for the village was $79,557. About 6.3% of the population were below the poverty line, including 9.5% of those under age 18 and 6.7% of those age 65 or over.

=== 2010 census ===
As of the 2010 census, there were 3,154 people residing in the village. The racial makeup of the village was 86.43% White, 1.62% African American, 8.34% Asian, 2.12% from other races, and 1.40% from two or more races. Hispanic or Latino of any race were 6.34% of the population.

=== 2000 census ===
As of the census of 2000, there were 2,700 people, 1,063 households, and 767 families residing in the village. The population density was 5,624.8 inhabitants per square mile (2,171.7/km^{2}). There were 1,071 housing units at an average density of 2,231.2 per square mile (861.5/km^{2}). The racial makeup of the village was 86.78% White, 1.15% African American, 0.04% Native American, 9.15% Asian, 1.00% from other races, and 1.89% from two or more races. Hispanic or Latino of any race were 6.30% of the population.

There were 1,063 households, out of which 31.7% had children under the age of 18 living with them, 61.8% were married couples living together, 7.6% had a female householder with no husband present, and 27.8% were non-families. 24.4% of all households were made up of individuals, and 10.3% had someone living alone who was 65 years of age or older. The average household size was 2.53 and the average family size was 2.99.

In the village, the population was spread out, with 22.7% under the age of 18, 4.8% from 18 to 24, 28.8% from 25 to 44, 29.0% from 45 to 64, and 14.7% who were 65 years of age or older. The median age was 41 years. For every 100 females, there were 94.9 males. For every 100 females age 18 and over, there were 92.1 males.

The median income for a household in the village was $89,287, and the median income for a family was $100,730. Males had a median income of $75,427 versus $52,315 for females. The per capita income for the village was $46,378. About 4.1% of families and 5.5% of the population were below the poverty line, including 4.5% of those under age 18 and 2.1% of those age 65 or over.

== Economy ==
Port Washington North is a bedroom community of the City of New York. Accordingly, a significant number of village residents commute to/from New York for work. From a land use perspective, the village consists of a relatively-balanced mix of residential, business, waterfront, and industrial districts.

Grumman Studios has a studio space in the industrial section of the village. Additionally, Publishers Clearing House was headquartered within the village until it moved to Jericho in the 2010s; the property was redeveloped into the Grumman Studios at Port Washington North facility.

Multiple shopping centers and standalone businesses exist within the section of the village zoned for business, primarily along Shore Road – including two large shopping centers: the Soundview Marketplace and the Stop & Shop Plaza. Light manufacturing, offices, warehouses, and production studios are located within the areas zoned for industrial uses – namely, within the "Economic Development" and "Maritime Business" districts.

Furthermore, the entire village is located within the Greater Port Washington Business Improvement District's boundaries.

== Government ==
=== Village government ===
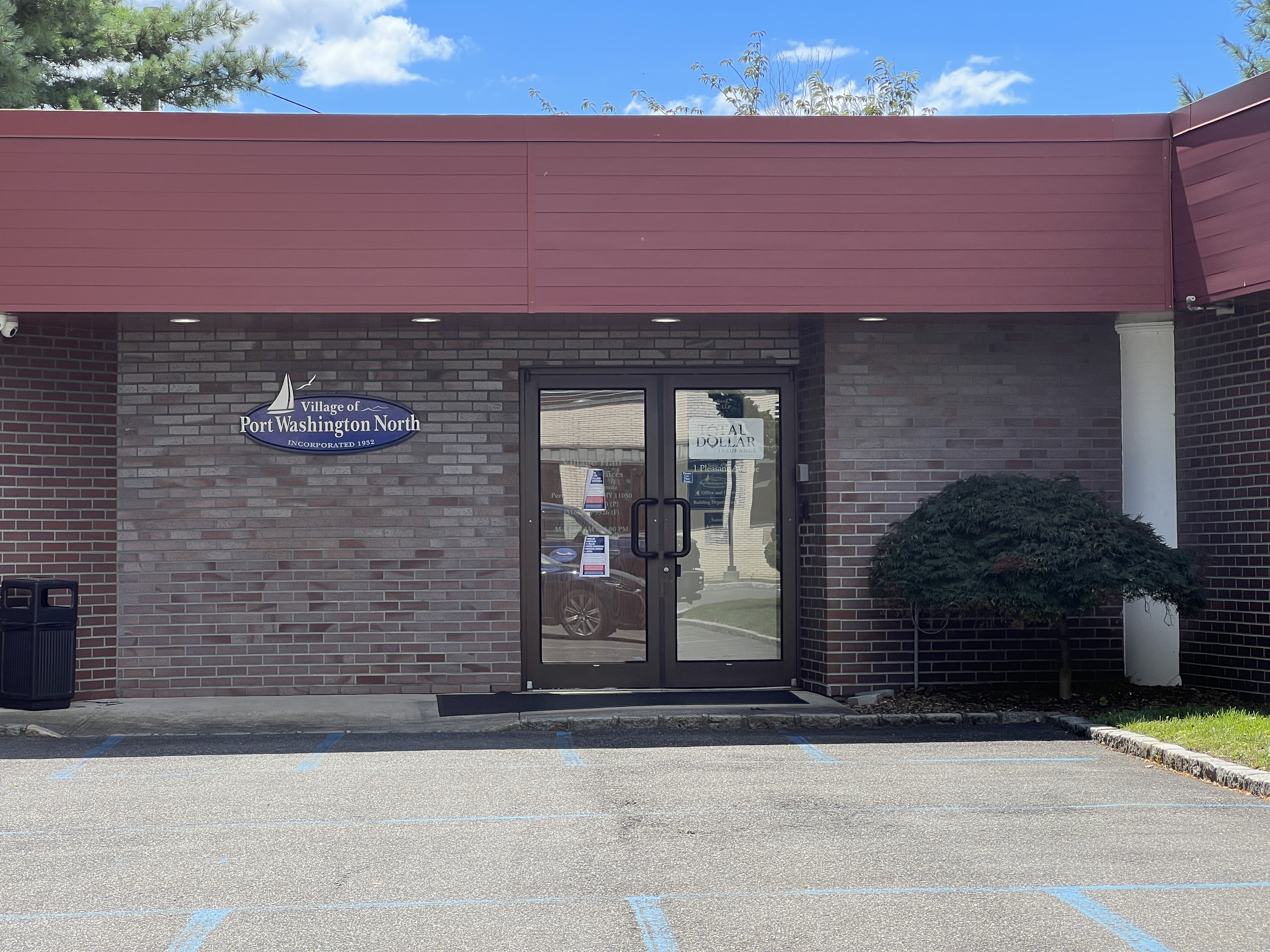
The entrance to Port Washington North's village office in 2022

The Village of Port Washington North is governed by the five-member Village of Port Washington North Board of Trustees, which consists of a mayor and four village trustees. The mayor and trustees are elected at-large every two years by residents.

As of May 2026, the Mayor of Port Washington North is Robert S. Weitzner and the Village Trustees are Steven Cohen, Matthew Kepke, Michael Malatino, and Andrea Scheff.

The following is a list of Port Washington North's mayors, from 1932 to present:

Mayors of Port Washington North:
Mayor's name	Year(s) in office
Jacob Cocks	1932–1936
Martin Cocks	1936–1957
Henry Zebroski	1957–1963
John L. Bauer, Jr.	1963–1964
Summer Berkman	1964–1965
Joel H. Joseph	1965–1971
Thomas J. Pellegrino	1971–2005
Robert S. Weitzner	2005–Present

=== Representation in higher government ===
On the town level, Port Washington North is located in the Town of North Hempstead's 6th council district, which as of June 2026 is represented on the North Hempstead Town Council by Mariann Dalimonte (D–Port Washington).

On the county level, Port Washington North is located in Nassau County's 11th Legislative district, which as of June 2026 is represented in the Nassau County Legislature by Delia DiRiggi-Whitton (D–Glen Cove).

On the state level, Port Washington North is located within the New York State Assembly's 16th State Assembly district and the New York State Senate's 7th State Senate district, which as of June 2026 are represented by Daniel J. Norber (R–Great Neck) and Jack M. Martins (R–Old Westbury), respectively.

On the federal level, Port Washington North is located in New York's 3rd congressional district, which as of June 2026 is represented by Thomas R. Suozzi (D–Glen Cove). Like the rest of New York, it is represented in the United States Senate by Charles E. Schumer (D) and Kirsten E. Gillibrand (D).

=== Politics ===
In the 2024 U.S. presidential election, the majority of Port Washington North voters voted for Kamala D. Harris (D).

== Parks and recreation ==
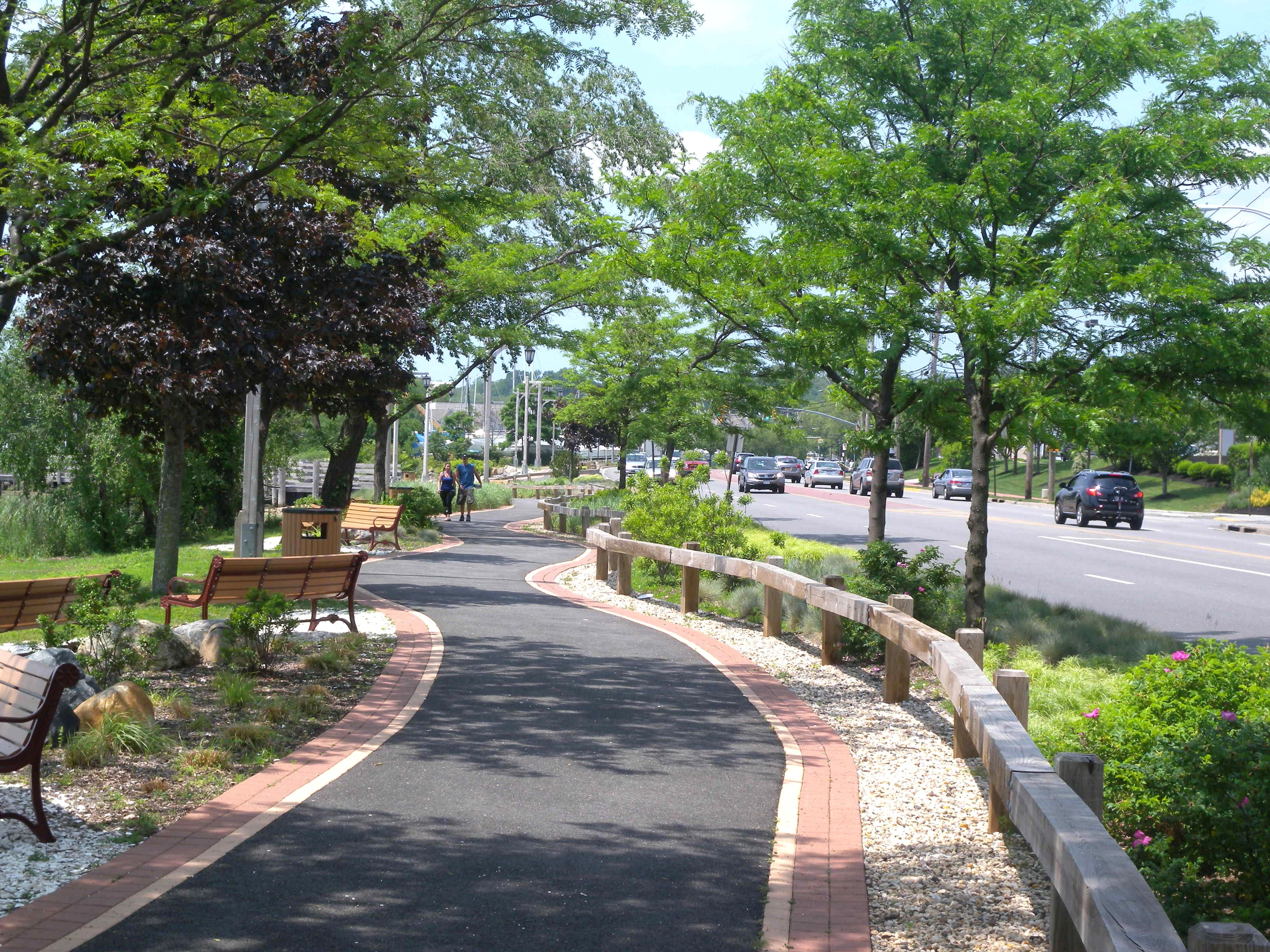
Bay Walk Park in 2011

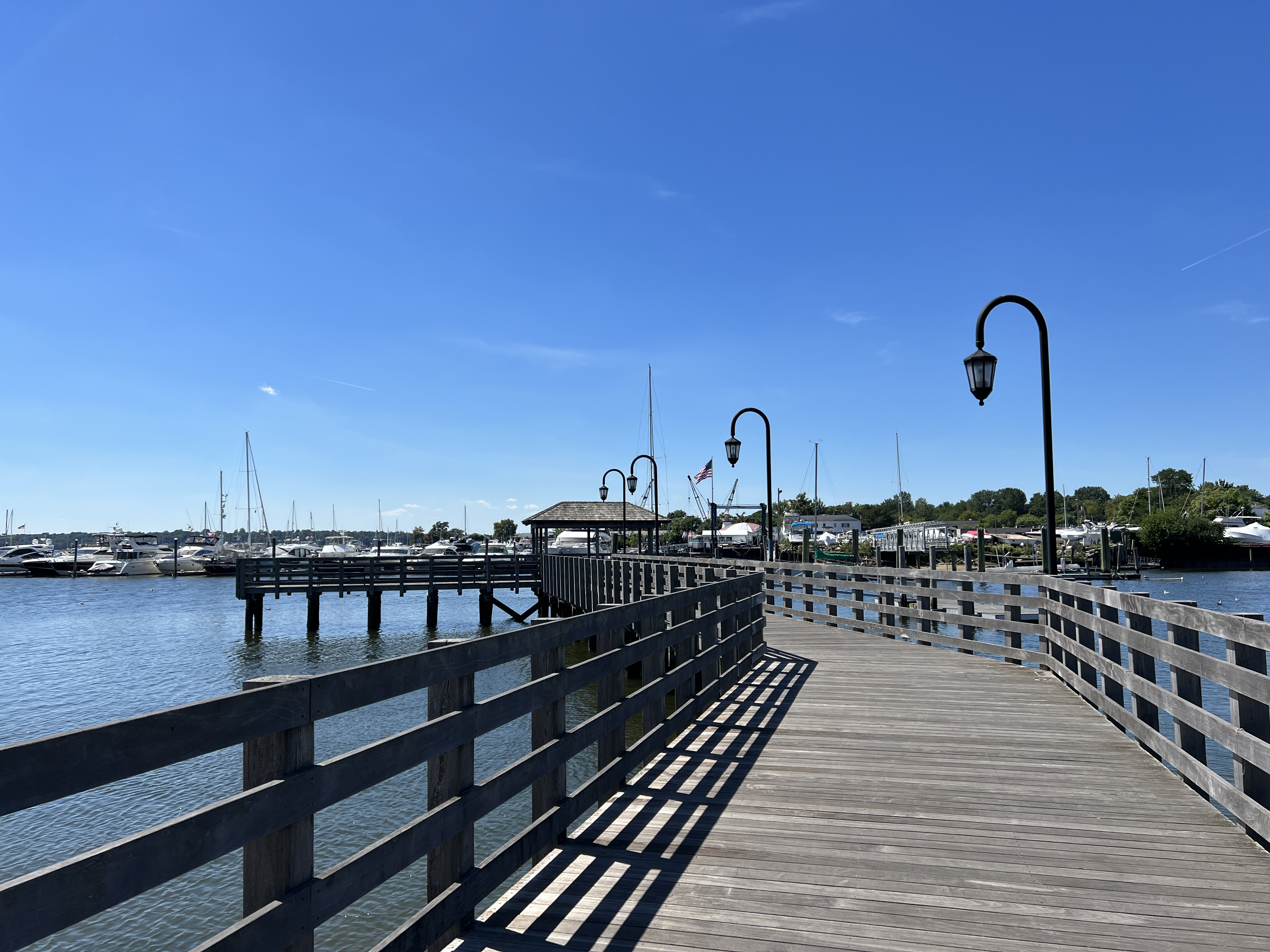
The Port Washington North Village Pier in 2022

The Village of Port Washington North owns and maintains a park along Manhasset Bay, known as Bay Walk Park. This village-operated park, which was constructed and opened in phases, also contains the village's Nautical Art Museum and the Port Washington North Village Pier.

Additionally, the Town of North Hempstead's Mill Pond Park is located within the village. This town-operated park, which contains Mill Pond, is located at the south end of the village and connects to Bay Walk Park. North Hempstead's Robert H. Dayton Park is also located within the village, across from Mill Pond Park, and is connected to Bay Walk Park.

== Education ==
=== School district ===
Port Washington North is located entirely within the boundaries of the Port Washington Union Free School District.

=== Library district ===
Port Washington North is located within the boundaries of the Port Washington Library District, which is served by the Port Washington Public Library in Baxter Estates.

== Infrastructure ==
=== Transportation ===
==== Road ====
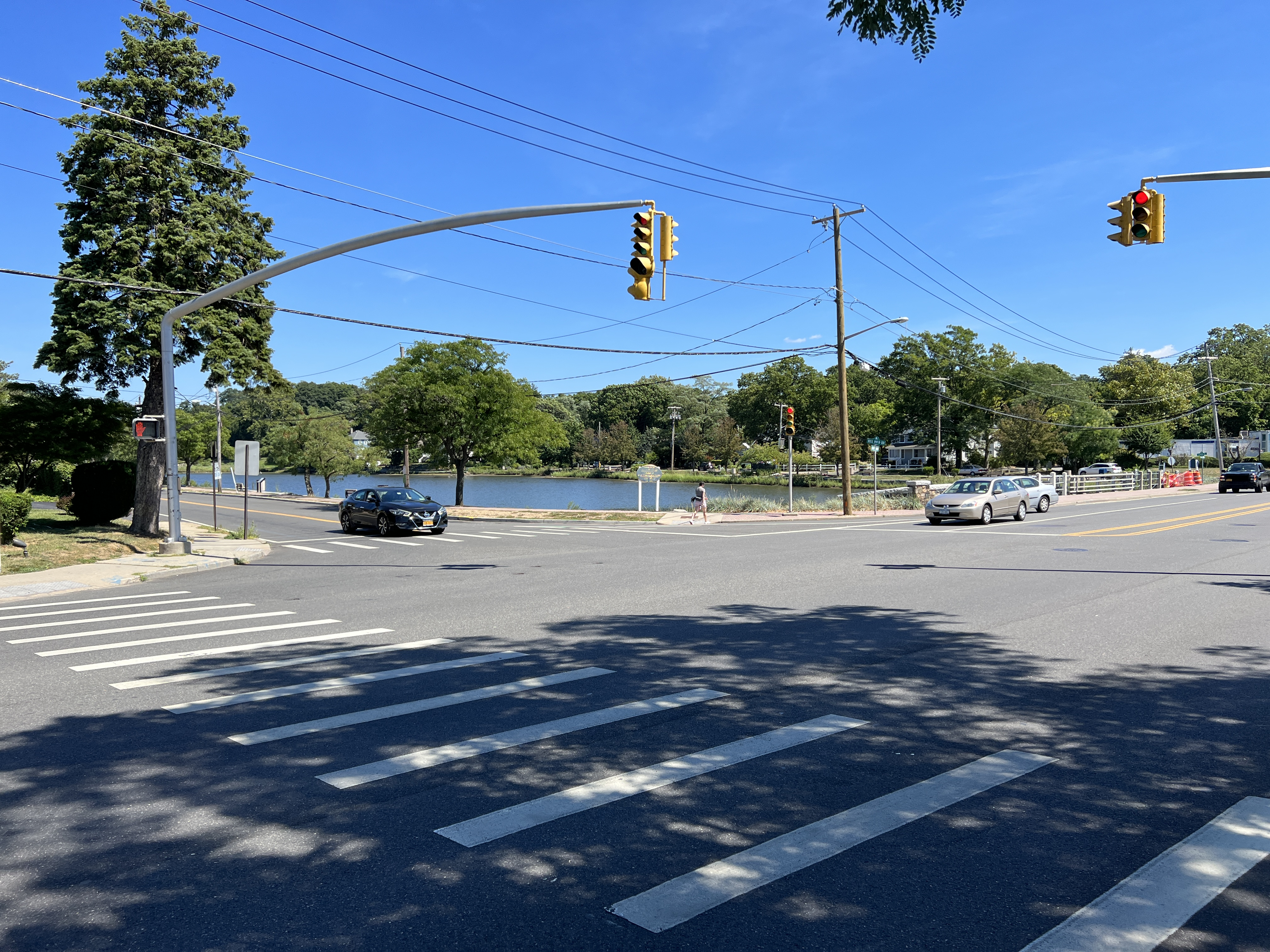
The intersection of Shore Road and Mill Pond Road in the village in 2022

Major roads in Port Washington North include Cow Neck Road (CR C53), Harbor Road (CR D07), Middle Neck Road (CR D55), Mill Pond Road (CR D57), and Shore Road (CR E25).

==== Bus ====
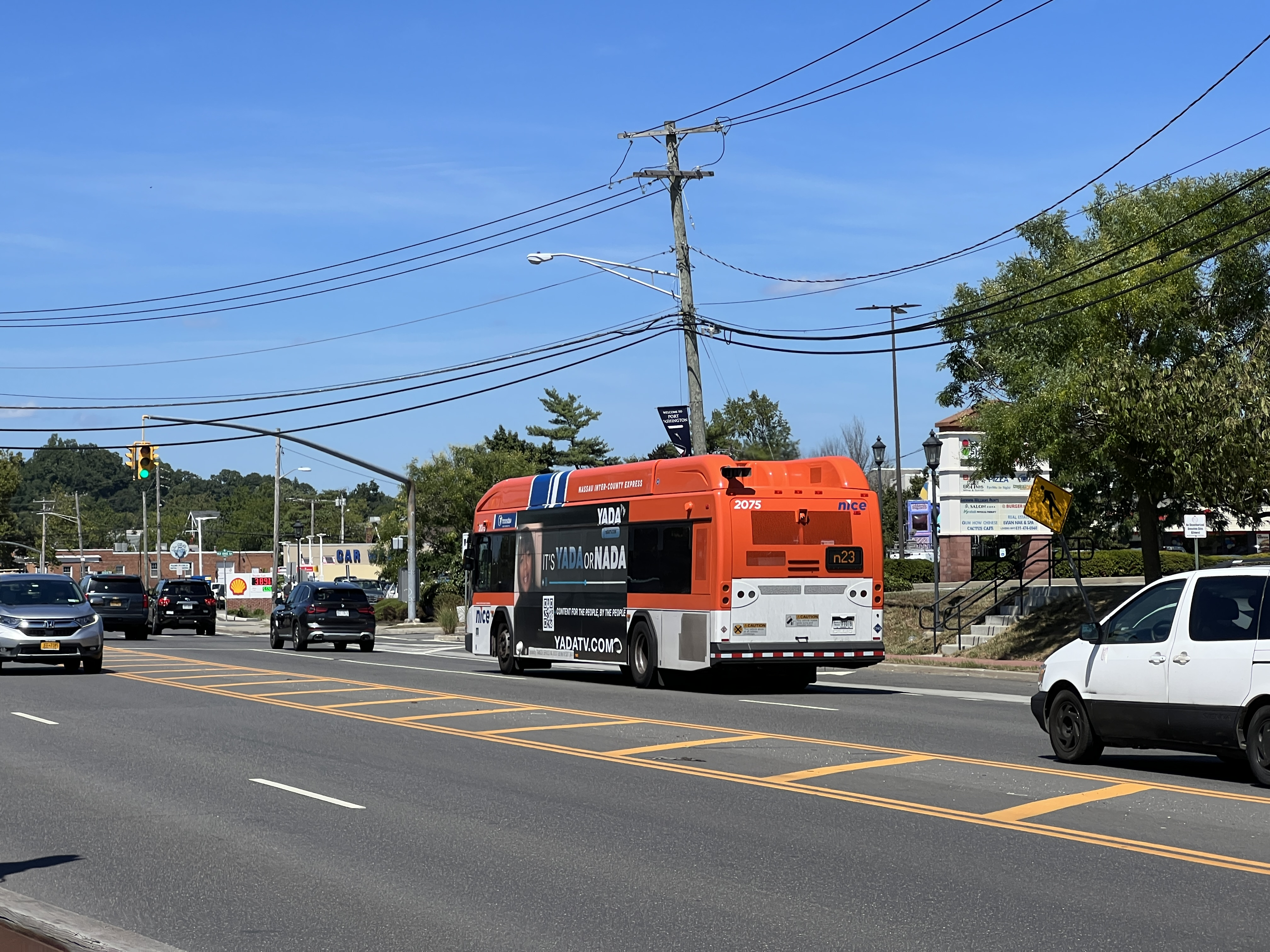
A Manorhaven-bound n23 bus on Shore Road within Port Washington North in 2022

As of June 2026, Port Washington North is served by two Nassau Inter-County Express bus routes: the n23 and the Port Washington Shuttle.

=== Utilities ===
==== Natural gas ====
National Grid USA provides natural gas to properties within Port Washington North that are hooked up to natural gas lines.

==== Power ====
PSEG Long Island provides power to all homes and businesses within Port Washington North, on behalf of the Long Island Power Authority.

==== Sewage ====
Port Washington North is located within the Port Washington Water Pollution Control District, which operates the sanitary sewer system serving the village.

==== Water ====
Port Washington North is located within the boundaries of the Port Washington Water District, which provides the entirety of the village with water.

=== Healthcare and emergency services ===
==== Healthcare ====
Although no hospitals are located within Port Washington North, a GoHealth urgent care center is located within the village, at the Stop & Shop Plaza; this facility is operated by Northwell Health.

==== Fire ====
Port Washington North, in its entirety, is located within the boundaries of (and is thus served by) the Port Washington Fire District.

==== Police ====
Port Washington North is served by the Port Washington Police District.

== Notable people ==
- Anthony D'Urso – Former New York State Assemblyman.

== See also ==
- List of municipalities in New York
- Port Washington, New York
