= Grumman Studios =

Sound stage complexes in Nassau County, New York, United States

Coordinates: 40.749147°N 73.50001370°W

- Industry: Film production
- Founded: 2007
- Founder: Parviz Farahzad
- Headquarters: Bethpage, New York; Port Washington North, New York
- Number of locations: 2 (2025)
- Owner: Parviz Farahzad
- Website: grummanstudios.com

Grumman Studios are two sound stage complexes in Nassau County, on Long Island, New York, United States. Its primary studio in Bethpage has an area of 160,000 square feet (15,000 m^{2}), seven sound stages, and 30 acres (12 ha) of paved outdoor space. It also operates an additional, 100,000-square-foot (9,300 m^{2}) studio – Grumman Studios at Port Washington North – in the Village of Port Washington North.

== Description ==
The project's principal owner is Parviz Farahzad, whose Bethpage production company is Lunar Module Park, LLC. The Bethpage studios are in the former Apollo Lunar Module assembly plant at the massive Grumman aircraft works and airport in Bethpage. Farahzad founded the company in 2007. The original blue Grumman landmark dome atop the facility has been repainted red for the new studio.

The Grumman Studios facility in Bethpage is one of two large sound stage complexes in Bethpage related to the original Grumman operation. The other is Gold Coast Studios, which has six sound stages totaling 105,000 sq ft (9,800 m^{2}) in the Steel Equities Bethpage Business Park.

The Bethpage studio is at 500 Grumman Road West. Its other location – Grumman Studios at Port Washington North – is at 382 Channel Drive in Port Washington North. Also owned by Farahzad, the Port Washington North studio has an area of 100,000 square feet (9,300 m^{2}).

== Notable productions ==
- The Wiz Live! (broadcast live on NBC from the studios on December 3, 2015.)
- Peter Pan Live! (broadcast live on NBC from the studios on December 4, 2014.)
- Annie filmed in 2013–2014
- The Sound of Music Live! (broadcast live on NBC from the studios on December 5, 2013.)
- The Amazing Spider-Man 2 (also filmed at Gold Coast), 2012.
- The Avengers (2012)
- The Dictator (2011); the United Nations sequence was filmed there.
- Salt (2009)

== See also ==
- Silvercup Studios – another film studio on Long Island.
