= North Hempstead, New York =

- Town
- Town of North Hempstead
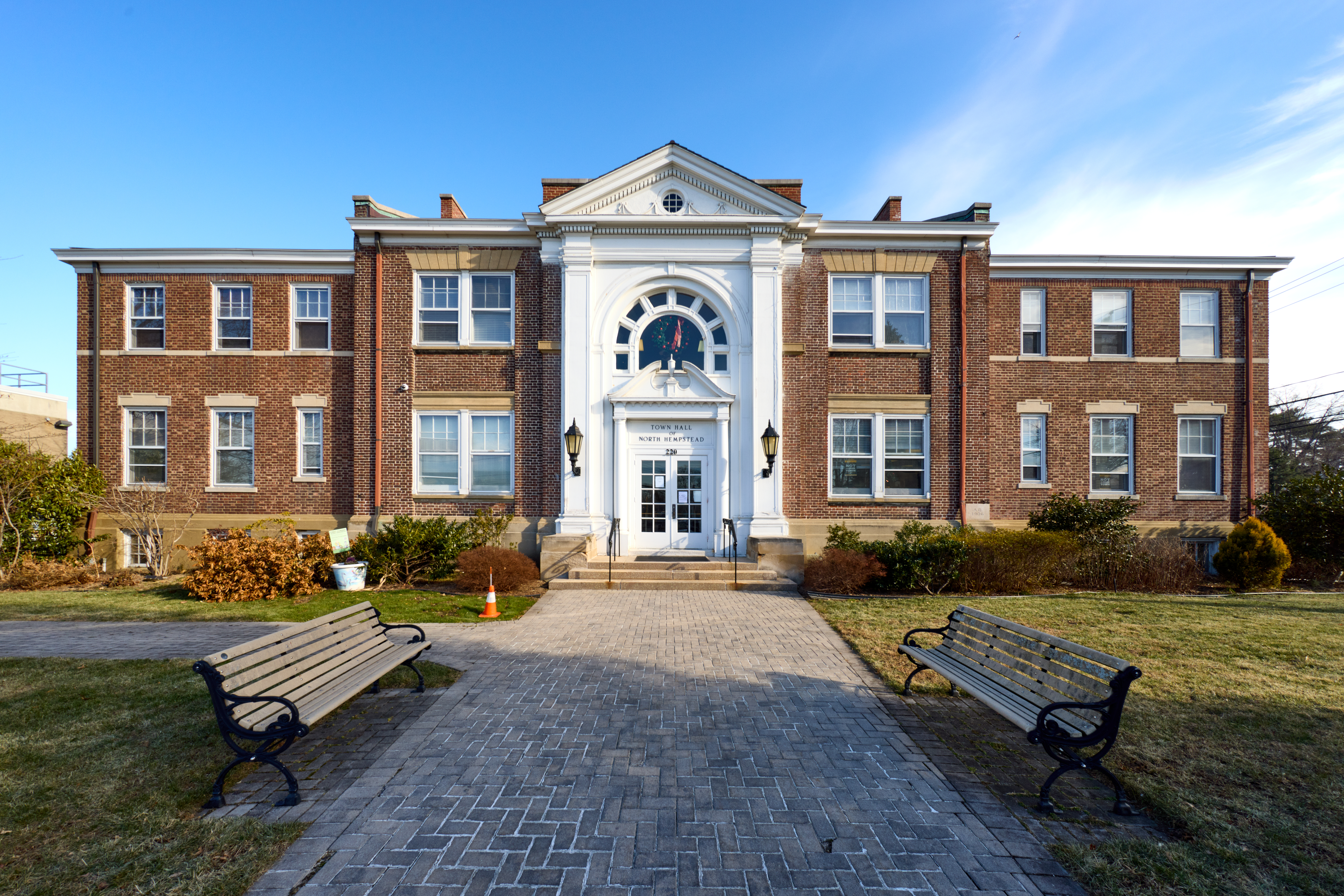
- North Hempstead Town Hall, located in Manhasset, the town seat

- Flag Seal
- Nicknames: TONH; TNH
- Location in Nassau County and the state of New York
- Coordinates: 40°45′32″N 73°35′17″W
- Country: United States
- State: New York
- County: Nassau
- First settled: 1643
- Incorporated as a town: 1784
- Named for: Location relative to Hempstead
- Town Seat: Manhasset

Government
  - Type: Town Council
  - Town Supervisor: Jennifer S. DeSena (R)
  - Town Council: Members' List: • D1: Robert Troiano, Jr. (D); • D2: Edward Scott (R), • D3: Dennis J. Walsh (R); • D4: Christine Liu (D); • D5: David A. Adhami (R); • D6: Mariann Dalimonte (D)

Area
  - Total: 69.19 sq mi (179.21 km^{2})
  - Land: 53.54 sq mi (138.68 km^{2})
  - Water: 15.65 sq mi (40.54 km^{2})
- Elevation: 102 ft (31 m)

Population (2020)
  - Total: 237,639
  - Rank: 3rd in Nassau County
  - Density: 4,438.3/sq mi (1,713.63/km^{2})
- Time zone: UTC-5 (Eastern (EST))
  - Summer (DST): UTC-4 (EDT)
- ZIP codes: 11001-11599
- Area codes: 516, 363
- FIPS code: 36-059-53000
- Website: www.northhempsteadny.gov

North Hempstead (officially known as the Town of North Hempstead) is one of three towns in Nassau County, on Long Island, in New York, United States. The population was 237,639 at the time of the 2020 census, making it the seventhmost populous city or town in New York.

== History ==
What is now the Town of North Hempstead was originally inhabited by Native Americans – specifically the Matinecock Nation. It was first settled by European explorers around 1643, as part of the Town of Hempstead.

The Census of Slaves, conducted in the Province of New York in 1755, contains a long list of enslaved individuals in Oyster Bay, including the hamlets of Jericho and what is now North Hempstead. It is followed by an additional list of "free Negroes Melattoes [people of Afro-European ancestry] and Mustees [people of Afro-Indigenous ancestry] Resideing within ye Township of Oysterbay that may probably Be Likely In case of Insurrections To be as Mischevious as ye Slaves." Free individuals were not supposed to be reported for the Census; a local militia captain supplied it on his own initiative, with the expectation "that ye Other Captains in Oysterbay will acquaint Your Honour [governor of New York] of those Resideing in ye Other parts of ye Township.")

During the American Revolution, the southern part of Hempstead was primarily Tory, while the northern part, having been settled by Yankees, supported the revolution. The town’s Montfort Cemetery in Port Washington contains the remains of around 150 early Dutch settlers and 100 grave markers of the colonial and post-revolutionary era, including its first supervisor, Adrian Onderdonk. In 1784 – following the war, the Town of North Hempstead was formed, after splitting off from the rest of Hempstead.

During the 19th century, North Hempstead became more affluent with the opening of the Long Island Rail Road through to Great Neck, and the inauguration of steamboat service from Manhattan in 1836.

During the first three decades of the 20th century, several North Hempstead communities incorporated themselves as villages, in turn assuming the power to set zoning restrictions to protect their rights and resources through municipal home rule. As of 2026, the Town of North Hempstead is made up of 31 incorporated villages. No new villages have been created within the Town of North Hempstead since Port Washington North in May 1932, and prospective villages were further discouraged from incorporating when the county charter was revised in 1936, which denied zoning powers to future villages in the county. Every village incorporation attempt within North Hempstead made following the county charter revision – most notably a mid-20th century push to incorporate all of Strathmore south of Northern Boulevard (NY 25A) – has been unsuccessful. There are also several unincorporated areas in the Town of North Hempstead that are not part of villages – such as Carle Place, Hillside Manor, Manhasset, Port Washington, and Roslyn Heights; these areas are instead governed directly by the Town of North Hempstead.

On September 11, 2025, the Town of North Hempstead formally dedicated its 9/11 memorial in Manhasset Valley Park; the memorial had been planned for over 10 years, and construction work had been completed earlier that year.

=== Etymology ===
North Hempstead's name reflects its geographical location immediately north of the Town of Hempstead, which – about the time of its secession therefrom – was also known as "South Hempstead."

== Geography ==
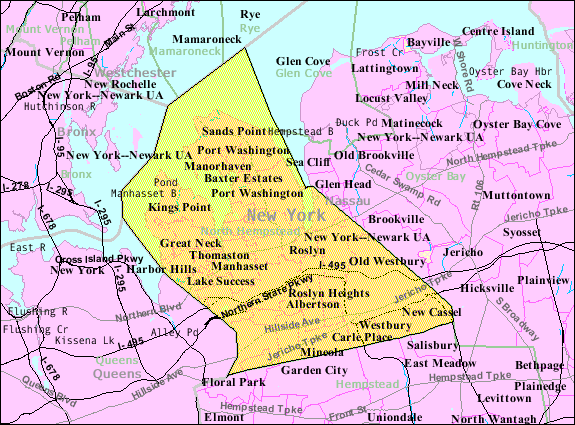
U.S. Census map of North Hempstead

According to the U.S. Census Bureau, the town has a total area of 69.2 square miles (179 km^{2}), of which 53.5 square miles (139 km^{2}) is land and 15.7 square miles (41 km^{2}), or 22.62%, is water.

The western town line is the border of Queens County, New York, part of New York City. The northern town line, delineated by the Long Island Sound, is the border of Bronx County (also part of New York City) and Westchester County. The Town of Oyster Bay and the City of Glen Cove are its eastern neighbors, and the Town of Hempstead is its southern neighbor.

North Hempstead is the only town on Long Island that does not have a corresponding hamlet or village in its borders with the same name; Hempstead and Oyster Bay in Nassau County and the towns of Huntington, Babylon, Islip, Smithtown, Brookhaven, Riverhead, Southold, Southampton, Shelter Island and East Hampton in Suffolk County all have smaller neighborhoods with the same name.

=== Climate ===
The Town of North Hempstead features a humid subtropical climate (Cfa) under the Köppen climate classification and is located near the transitional zone between humid subtropical and humid continental (Dfa) climates. Accordingly, the hamlet experiences hot, humid summers and cold winters, and experiences precipitation throughout the entirety of the year.

Climate data for Manhasset CDP, New York
| Month | Jan | Feb | Mar | Apr | May | Jun | Jul | Aug | Sep | Oct | Nov | Dec | Year |
|---|---|---|---|---|---|---|---|---|---|---|---|---|---|
| Record high °F (°C) | 71 (22) | 73 (23) | 87 (31) | 94 (34) | 96 (36) | 101 (38) | 108 (42) | 105 (41) | 97 (36) | 89 (32) | 83 (28) | 76 (24) | 108 (42) |
| Mean daily maximum °F (°C) | 40.4 (4.7) | 42.9 (6.1) | 51.1 (10.6) | 61.2 (16.2) | 70.6 (21.4) | 79.6 (26.4) | 84.5 (29.2) | 83.3 (28.5) | 76.0 (24.4) | 65.4 (18.6) | 55.7 (13.2) | 45.1 (7.3) | 63.0 (17.2) |
| Daily mean °F (°C) | 33.4 (0.8) | 35.0 (1.7) | 42.0 (5.6) | 51.8 (11.0) | 60.8 (16.0) | 70.1 (21.2) | 75.2 (24.0) | 74.1 (23.4) | 67.2 (19.6) | 56.5 (13.6) | 47.8 (8.8) | 38.2 (3.4) | 54.3 (12.4) |
| Mean daily minimum °F (°C) | 26.4 (−3.1) | 27.1 (−2.7) | 33.5 (0.8) | 42.4 (5.8) | 51.0 (10.6) | 60.6 (15.9) | 65.8 (18.8) | 65.0 (18.3) | 58.3 (14.6) | 47.6 (8.7) | 39.9 (4.4) | 31.2 (−0.4) | 45.7 (7.6) |
| Record low °F (°C) | −4 (−20) | −5 (−21) | 5 (−15) | 13 (−11) | 34 (1) | 43 (6) | 50 (10) | 46 (8) | 38 (3) | 27 (−3) | 18 (−8) | −2 (−19) | −5 (−21) |
| Average precipitation inches (mm) | 3.56 (90) | 2.87 (73) | 4.47 (114) | 3.85 (98) | 3.23 (82) | 3.54 (90) | 3.97 (101) | 4.26 (108) | 4.31 (109) | 4.08 (104) | 3.18 (81) | 3.99 (101) | 45.31 (1,151) |
| Average snowfall inches (cm) | 5.5 (14) | 7.8 (20) | 3.7 (9.4) | 0.3 (0.76) | 0 (0) | 0 (0) | 0 (0) | 0 (0) | 0 (0) | 0 (0) | 0.2 (0.51) | 5.7 (14) | 23.2 (58.67) |
| Average relative humidity (%) | 73 | 75 | 72 | 72 | 75 | 74 | 73 | 71 | 73 | 73 | 71 | 75 | 73 |
| Mean monthly sunshine hours | 177 | 153 | 172 | 167 | 202 | 213 | 237 | 241 | 215 | 190 | 210 | 171 | 2,348 |
| Average ultraviolet index | 2 | 2 | 2 | 3 | 5 | 6 | 6 | 6 | 5 | 3 | 2 | 2 | 4 |
Source: NOAA; Weather Atlas; The Weather Channel

=== Communities ===
==== Villages (incorporated) ====
The Town of North Hempstead contains 31 villages:

1. Baxter Estates
2. East Hills (part; small section in the Town of Oyster Bay)
3. East Williston
4. Floral Park (part; mostly in the Town of Hempstead)
5. Flower Hill
6. Garden City (part; mostly in the Town of Hempstead)
7. Great Neck
8. Great Neck Estates
9. Great Neck Plaza
10. Kensington
11. Kings Point
12. Lake Success
13. Manorhaven
14. Mineola (part; small section in the Town of Hempstead)
15. Munsey Park
16. New Hyde Park (part; southern half in the Town of Hempstead)
17. North Hills
18. Old Westbury (part; northeastern section in the Town of Oyster Bay)
19. Plandome
20. Plandome Heights
21. Plandome Manor
22. Port Washington North
23. Roslyn
24. Roslyn Estates
25. Roslyn Harbor (part; small section in the Town of Oyster Bay)
26. Russell Gardens
27. Saddle Rock
28. Sands Point
29. Thomaston
30. Westbury
31. Williston Park

==== Hamlets (unincorporated) ====
The Town of North Hempstead includes the following unincorporated hamlets, which are governed by North Hempstead:

1. Albertson
2. Carle Place
3. Floral Park Centre
4. Garden City Park
5. Glenwood Landing (part; mostly in Oyster Bay)
6. Great Neck Gardens
7. Greenvale (part; northeast section in Oyster Bay)
8. Harbor Hills
9. Herricks
10. Hillside Manor
11. Lakeville Estates
12. Manhasset (town seat)
13. Manhasset Hills
14. New Cassel
15. North New Hyde Park
16. Port Washington
17. Roslyn Heights
18. Saddle Rock Estates
19. Searingtown
20. Strathmore
21. University Gardens

==== Other locations ====
- Cow Neck, or Manhasset Neck – A peninsula into the Long Island Sound.
- Great Neck – A peninsula into the Long Island Sound.
- Hempstead Harbor – A bay of the Long Island Sound.
- Lake Success – A lake near the western town line.
- Little Neck Bay – A bay of the Long Island Sound.
- Manhasset Bay – A bay of the Long Island Sound.
- United States Merchant Marine Academy – located in Kings Point.

== Demographics ==
Historical population
| Census | Pop. | Note | %± |
|---|---|---|---|
| 1790 | 2,696 | | — |
| 1800 | 2,413 | | −10.5% |
| 1810 | 2,700 | | 11.9% |
| 1830 | 3,062 | | — |
| 1840 | 3,891 | | 27.1% |
| 1850 | 4,291 | | 10.3% |
| 1860 | 5,419 | | 26.3% |
| 1870 | 6,540 | | 20.7% |
| 1880 | 7,560 | | 15.6% |
| 1890 | 8,134 | | 7.6% |
| 1900 | 12,048 | | 48.1% |
| 1910 | 17,831 | | 48.0% |
| 1920 | 26,370 | | 47.9% |
| 1930 | 62,202 | | 135.9% |
| 1940 | 83,385 | | 34.1% |
| 1950 | 142,613 | | 71.0% |
| 1960 | 219,088 | | 53.6% |
| 1970 | 235,007 | | 7.3% |
| 1980 | 218,624 | | −7.0% |
| 1990 | 211,393 | | −3.3% |
| 2000 | 221,372 | | 4.7% |
| 2010 | 226,322 | | 2.2% |
| 2020 | 237,639 | | 5.0% |
U.S. Decennial Census

=== Racial and ethnic composition ===
North Hempstead town, New York – Racial and ethnic composition Note: the US Census treats Hispanic/Latino as an ethnic category. This table excludes Latinos from the racial categories and assigns them to a separate category. Hispanics/Latinos may be of any race.
| Race / Ethnicity (NH = Non-Hispanic) | Pop 2000 | Pop 2010 | Pop 2020 | % 2000 | % 2010 | % 2020 |
|---|---|---|---|---|---|---|
| White alone (NH) | 162,762 | 146,760 | 128,168 | 73.11% | 64.85% | 53.93% |
| Black or African American alone (NH) | 13,651 | 11,971 | 11,312 | 6.13% | 5.29% | 4.76% |
| Native American or Alaska Native alone (NH) | 173 | 183 | 253 | 0.08% | 0.08% | 0.11% |
| Asian alone (NH) | 20,209 | 33,747 | 54,700 | 9.08% | 14.91% | 23.02% |
| Native Hawaiian or Pacific Islander alone (NH) | 42 | 24 | 50 | 0.02% | 0.01% | 0.02% |
| Other race alone (NH) | 414 | 691 | 1,649 | 0.19% | 0.31% | 0.69% |
| Mixed race or Multiracial (NH) | 3,488 | 3,872 | 6,424 | 1.57% | 1.71% | 2.70% |
| Hispanic or Latino (any race) | 21,872 | 29,074 | 35,083 | 9.83% | 12.85% | 14.76% |
| Total | 222,611 | 226,322 | 237,639 | 100.00% | 100.00% | 100.00% |

=== 2020 census ===
As of the census of 2020, there were 237,639 people residing in 79,546 households in the town. There were 83,729 housing units, 76.5% of which were owner-occupied. The racial makeup of the town was 56% White, 23.1% Asian, 4.9% African American, 0.4% Native American, 7.8% from other races, and 7.7% from two or more races. Hispanic or Latino of any race were 14.8% of the population.

There were 79,546 households, out of which 35.1% had children under the age of 18 living with them, 60.6% were married couples living together, 23.5% had a female householder with no spouse or partner present, and 12.6% had a male householder with no spouse or partner present. 40.2% of all households had individuals 65 years of age or older.

In the town, the population was spread out, with 21.9% under the age of 18 and 21.7% who were 65 years of age or older. The median age was 42.8 years. The population was 51.6% female.

According to a 2007 estimate, the median income for a household in the town was $96,517, and the median income for a family was $115,697. Males had a median income of $60,094 versus $41,331 for females. The per capita income for the town was $41,621. About 3.1% of families and 4.8% of the population were below the poverty line, including 5.4% of those under age 18 and 5.1% of those age 65 or over.

Between the 1990 census and the 2000 census, North Hempstead lost some population growth to Queens.

== Government ==
=== Town government ===
The Town of North Hempstead is governed by a seven-member board – known as the North Hempstead Town Council, which is composed of six council members and the Town Supervisor. Council members are each elected by – and represent – a single councilmanic district within the Town. The Supervisor is elected at-large and represents the entirety of the Town.

In addition to Supervisor, there are two other town-wide positions elected at-large: the Town Clerk and the Receiver of Taxes.

==== Elected officials ====
===== Supervisor =====
As of January 2026, the Town Supervisor of North Hempstead is Jennifer S. DeSena (R–Manhasset).

The following is a list of North Hempstead's supervisors, from 1784 to present:

Town Supervisors of North Hempstead:
| Supervisor's name | Year(s) in office | Residence |
|---|---|---|
| Adrian Onderdonck | 1784–1786 | Manhasset |
| Richard Throne | 1786–1787 | Great Neck |
| Adries Hegeman Sr. | 1787–1809 | Flower Hill |
| Lawrence Denton | 1809–1819 | Herricks |
| John B. Kissam | 1819–1821 | Herricks |
| Singleton Mitchell | 1821–1829 | Manhasset |
| Henry I. Hagner | 1829–1830 | Herricks |
| William L. Mitchell | 1830–1838 | Great Neck |
| John Willis | 1838–1846 | Westbury |
| Silvanus S. Smith | 1846–1853 | East Herricks |
| John S. Wood | 1853–1854 | Westbury |
| John M. Clark | 1854–1855 | Westbury |
| Andrew J. Hegeman | 1855–1856 | Manhasset |
| John M. Clark | 1856–1868 | Westbury |
| Benjamin W. Allen | 1868–1870 | Great Neck |
| Henry D. Remsen | 1870–1873 | Great Neck |
| John M. Clark | 1873–1874 | Westbury |
| Henry D. Remsen | 1874–1875 | Great Neck |
| Samuel Willets | 1875–1877 | Westbury |
| John M. Clark | 1877–1882 | Westbury |
| Jacob S. Powell | 1882–1885 | Manhasset |
| Augustus Denton | 1885–1886 | New Hyde Park |
| Jacob S. Powell | 1886–1889 | Manhasset |
| John T. Woolley | 1889–1890 | Lake Success |
| John M. Clark | 1890–1892 | Westbury |
| Augustus Denton | 1892–1893 | New Hyde Park |
| Jacob S. Powell | 1893–1895 | Manhasset |
| Augustus Denton | 1895–1900 | New Hyde Park |
| Edwin C. Willets | 1900–1903 | Roslyn |
| Eugene V. Willis | 1903–1904 | Mineola |
| Edwin C. Willets | 1904–1907 | Roslyn |
| Philip J. Christ | 1907–1917 | New Hyde Park |
| Cornelius E. Remsen | 1917–1929 | Roslyn |
| Charles Snedeker | 1929–1938 | Manhasset |
| Dwight Rogers | 1938 | Mineola |
| Hartford N. Gunn Sr. | 1938–1950 | Port Washington |
| Henry A. Sahm | 1950–1960 | Great Neck |
| Clinton G. Martin | 1960–1965 | North New Hyde Park |
| Solomon Wachtler | 1965–1967 | Kings Point |
| Robert C. Meade | 1968–1970 | Great Neck |
| Michael J. Tully Jr. | 1971–1982 | North New Hyde Park |
| John B. Kiernan | 1982–1989 | Williston Park |
| Benjamin L. Zwirn | 1990–1993 | Port Washington |
| May W. Newburger | 1994–2003 | Great Neck |
| Jon Kaiman | 2004–2014 | Great Neck |
| Judi Bosworth | 2014–2021 | Harbor Hills |
| Jennifer S. DeSena | 2021–present | Strathmore |

===== Council members =====
As of January 2024, the North Hempstead Town Council consists of the following council members:

North Hempstead Town Council
| District | Legislator | Party | Residence |
|---|---|---|---|
| 1 | Robert J. Troiano | Democratic | Westbury |
| 2 | Edward Scott | Republican | Albertson |
| 3 | Dennis J. Walsh | Republican | Mineola |
| 4 | Christine Liu | Democratic | Herricks |
| 5 | Yaron Levy | Republican | Harbor Hills |
| 6 | Mariann Dalimonte | Democratic | Port Washington |

===== Clerk =====
As of January 2026, the Town Clerk of North Hempstead is Ragini Srivastava (R–Manhasset Hills).

===== Receiver of Taxes =====
As of January 2026, the Receiver of Taxes of North Hempstead is Mary Jo Collins (R–Flower Hill).

=== Politics ===
In the 2020 U.S. presidential election, Joseph R. Biden (D) carried the vote in the Town of North Hempstead, with 396,504 votes – 54.11% of the electorate. Donald J. Trump (R) received 326,716 votes, placing him at 44.59% of the vote.

== Economy ==
- Northwell Health, the largest employer on Long Island, is based in Great Neck.
- The Americana Manhasset (and the "Miracle Mile", as a whole) – one of Long Island's most famous shopping malls and areas – is located on Northern Boulevard (NY 25A) in Manhasset.
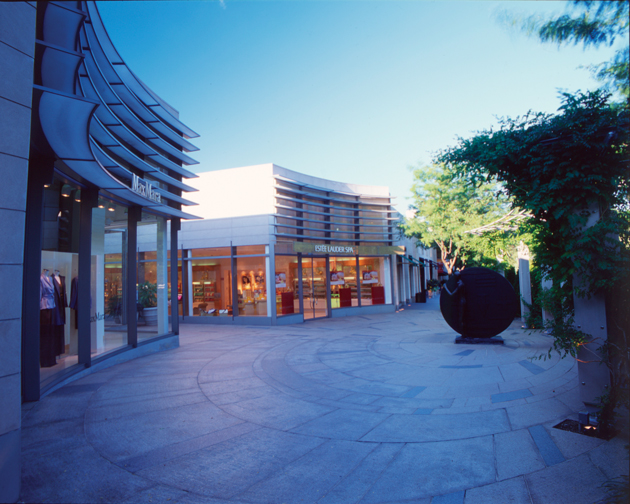
  Stores at the Americana Manhasset
- The North American headquarters of Sabena were located in a 36,000 square feet (3,300 m^{2}) office building in Manhasset in North Hempstead. In April 2002 Knightsbridge Properties Corp. bought the building for $4.9 million. Due to the bankruptcies of Sabena and Swissair, the real estate deal took over a year to finish. During that month, the building was 30% occupied. Sabena was scheduled to move out of the building on May 10, 2002. The buyer planned to spend an additional $2 million to convert the building into a multi-tenant, Class A office and medical facility. At one time, Servisair's Americas offices were in Great Neck.
- Sumitomo Corporation operates its Lake Success Shared Services Center in an area in the town of North Hempstead, south of Lake Success.
- Systemax, Pall, Publishers Clearing House and NPD Group are based in Port Washington.

=== Top employers ===
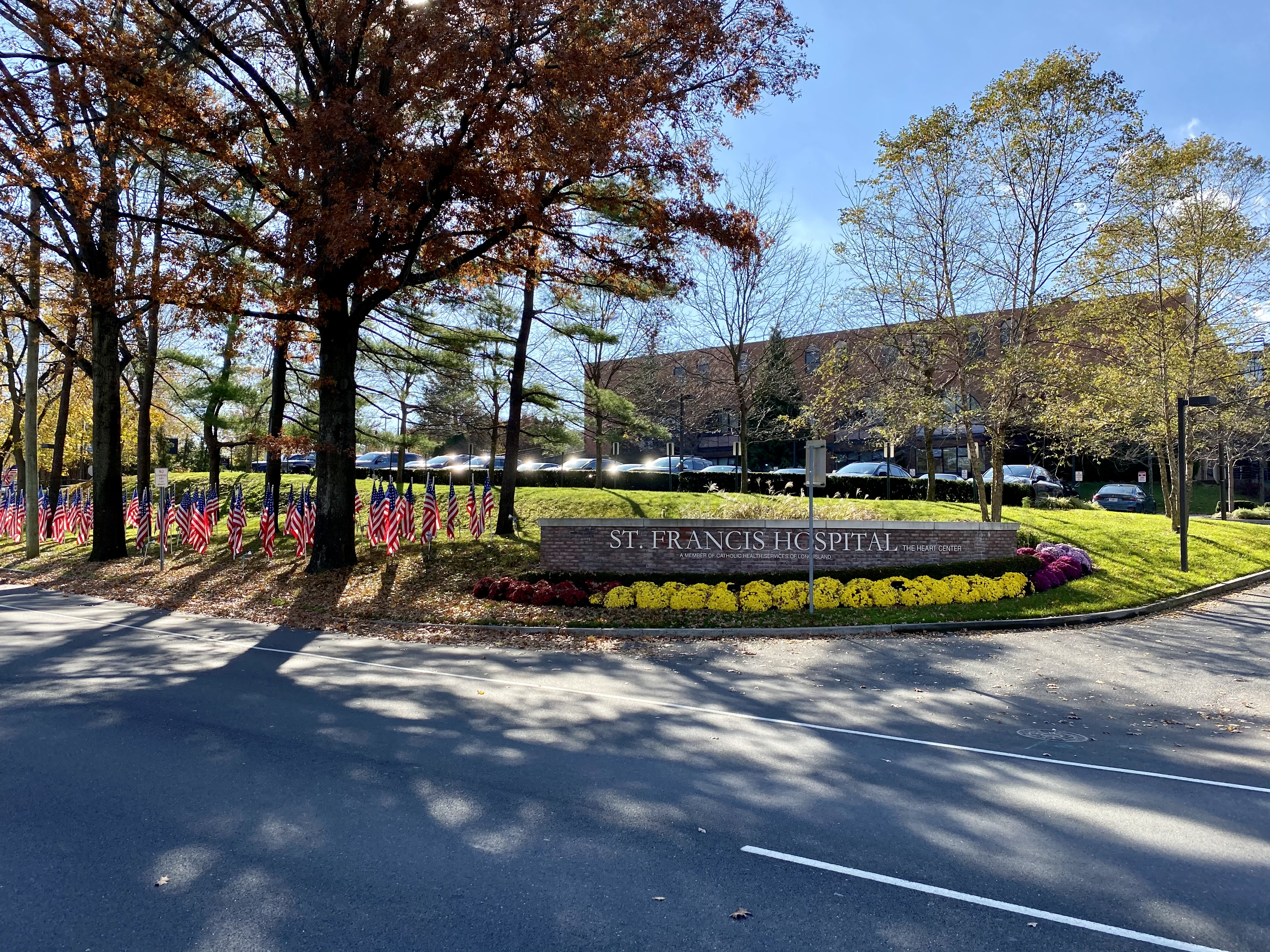
St. Francis Hospital, located in Flower Hill, was the third largest employer in North Hempstead in 2021

According to North Hempstead's 2021 Annual Comprehensive Financial Report, the top employers in the town are:

| # | Employer | # of Employees |
|---|---|---|
| 1 | North Shore University Hospital | 13,697 |
| 2 | NYU Langone Hospital – Long Island | 8,706 |
| 3 | St. Francis Hospital | 3,573 |
| 4 | Northwell Health Home Care | 1,001 |
| 5 | Daniel Gale Sotheby's International Realty | 950 |
| 6 | Northwell Health Stern Family Center | 576 |
| 7 | Laffey Real Estate | 560 |
| 8 | Coffee Distributing Corp | 390 |
| 9 | Sunharbor Manor | 220 |
| 10 | Sands Point Center for Health & Rehabilitation | 197 |

== Transportation ==
=== Rail ===
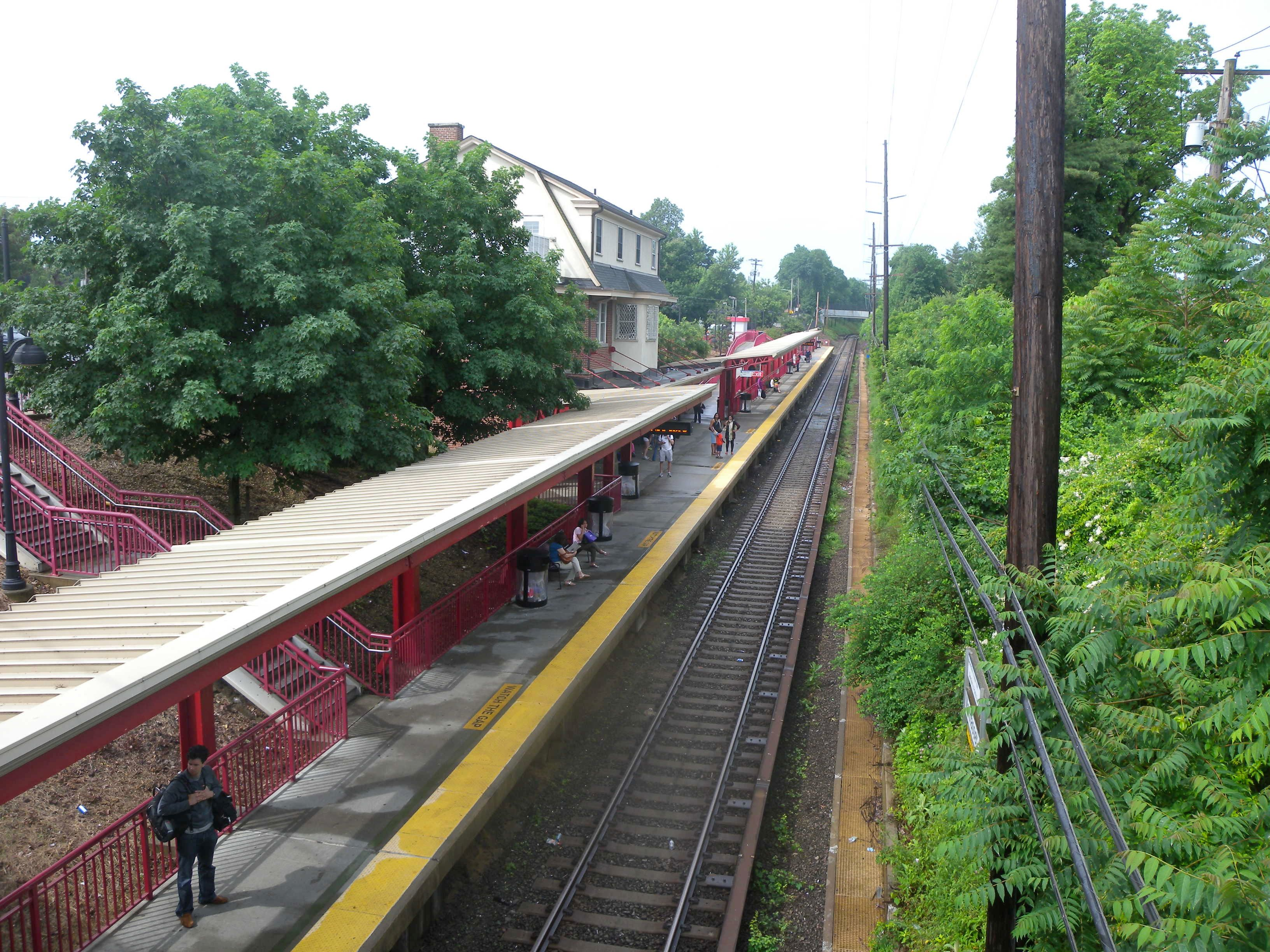
The Manhasset LIRR station

The Long Island Rail Road's Oyster Bay Branch serves the town's vicinity from Mineola to Greenvale. The Main Line runs through the southern parts of the town with stations at Merillon Avenue in Garden City Park through Westbury. The Port Washington Branch runs through the northern part of the town and uses stations from Great Neck across the Manhasset Viaduct into Port Washington.

=== Bus ===
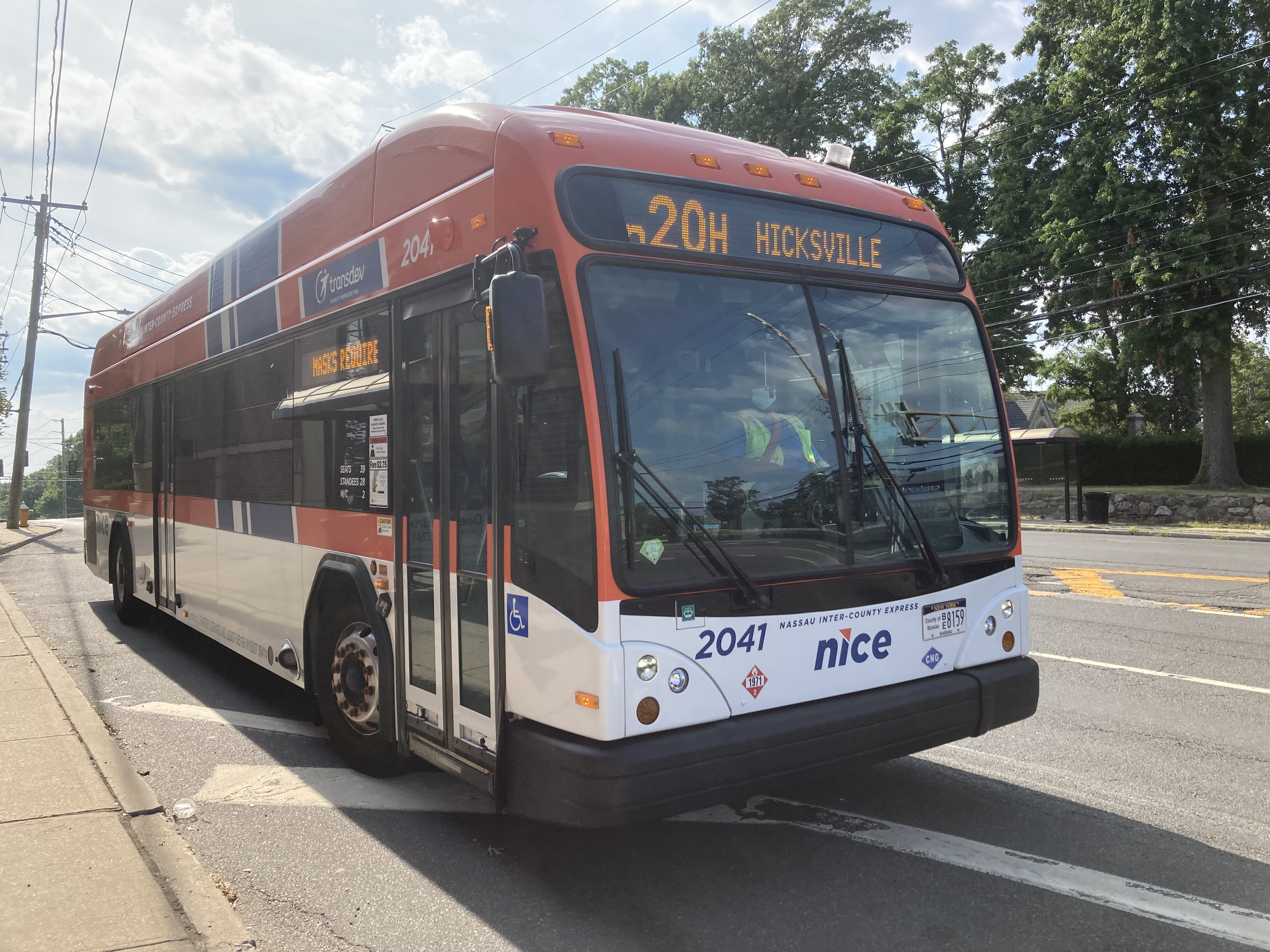
An eastbound n20H bus in Manhasset

The Town of North Hempstead is served primarily by Nassau Inter-County Express bus routes, though at least two of New York City's MTA Bus Routes enter Nassau County from Queens and travel within North Hempstead.

=== Major roads ===
- Interstate 495 is the Long Island Expressway, and the sole interstate highway in the Town of North Hempstead, with interchanges from Exit 33 in Lake Success to Exit 39 in Old Westbury.
- Northern State Parkway is a suburban continuation of the Grand Central Parkway that has interchanges from Exit 25 in Lake Success to Exit 34 in Westbury. The route runs along the south side of the Long Island Expressway. As a parkway, no trucks are allowed.
- Meadowbrook State Parkway runs south to north and only exists within the town between Old Country Road (Exits M1) and the Northern State Parkway, at the Westbury Interchange.
- Wantagh State Parkway only exists within the town between Old Country Rd (Exit W2) and Northern State Parkway.
- New York State Route 25A is the northernmost west–east route in the town, and is a suffixed route of NY 25.
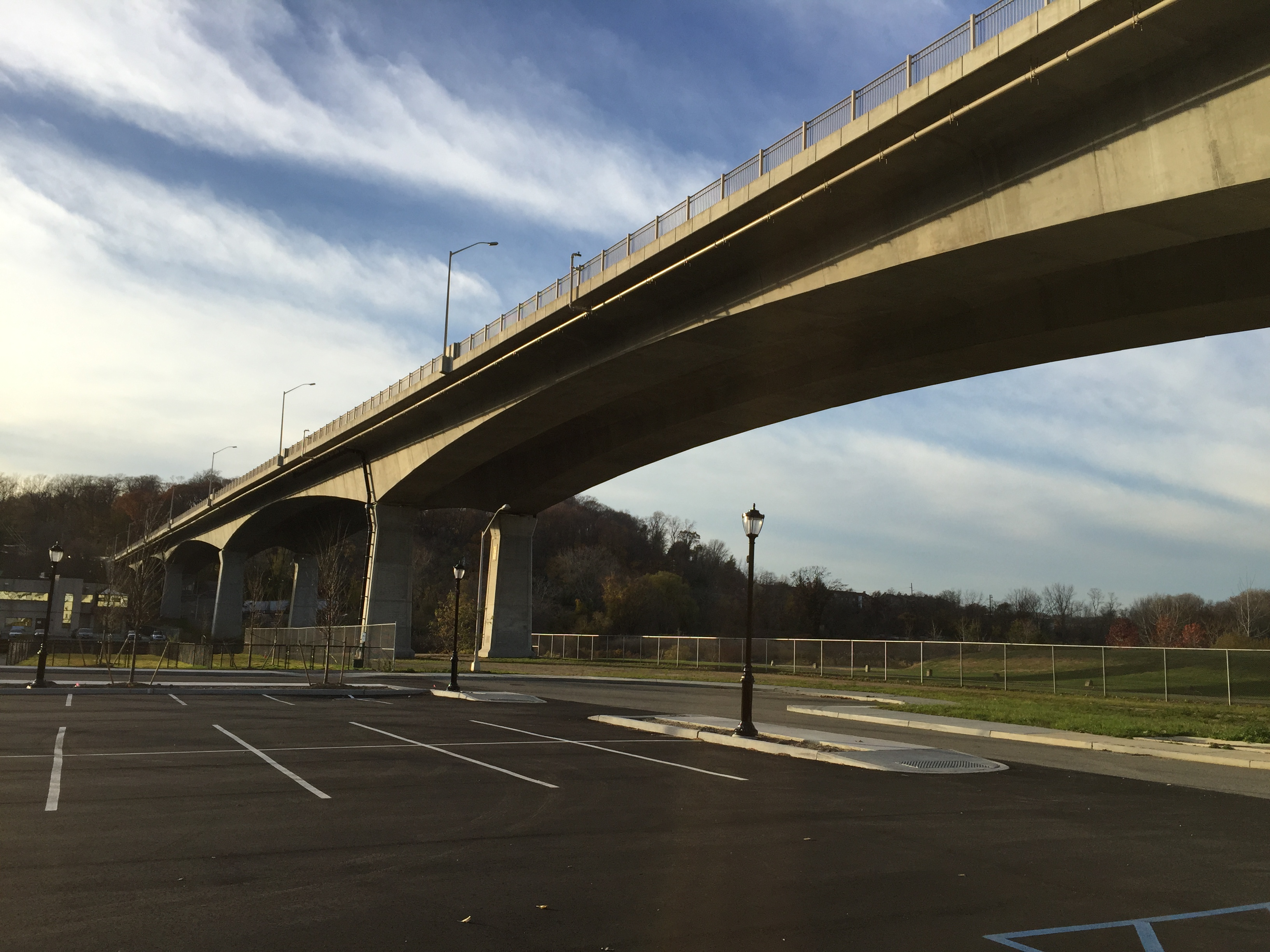
  The William Cullen Bryant Viaduct carries New York State Route 25A over Hempstead Harbor in Roslyn
- New York State Route 25B is another west–east suffixed route of NY 25 that runs from the Bellerose section of Queens into NY 25 in Westbury.
- New York State Route 25
- New York State Route 101 is a south–north state route that runs from Flower Hill, through downtown Port Washington, and eventually into Sands Point.
- Beacon Hill Road
- Bryant Avenue
- East Broadway
- Glen Cove Road
- Herricks Road
- Mineola Avenue
- Old Country Road
- Old Northern Boulevard
- Shelter Rock Road
- West Shore Road
- Willis Avenue

=== Airports ===
- Sands Point Seaplane Base

== Notable people ==
- Bloodgood Cutter (1817–1906) – Poet.
- Dino Klapija (born 2007) – Soccer player.
- Wright Post (1766–1828) – Surgeon.
- John A. Searing (1805–1876) – Politician.

== See also ==
- List of towns in New York
- National Register of Historic Places listings in North Hempstead (town), New York
