= Central Drive =

County highway in Nassau County, New York

- Central Drive (CR C36), highlighted in red

Route information
- Maintained by NCDPW
- Length: 0.52 mi (840 m)

Major junctions
- West end: Main Street in Baxter Estates
- East end: Shore Road (CR E25) in Baxter Estates

Location
- Country: United States
- State: New York
- County: Nassau

Highway system
- County routes in New York; County Routes in Nassau County

Central Drive is a street located entirely within – and is the main thoroughfare through – the Incorporated Village of Baxter Estates in Nassau County, on the North Shore of Long Island, in New York, United States. It is currently designated as one of two discontiguous segments of the unsigned Nassau County Route C36 (with Linden Boulevard / Central Avenue in Valley Stream being the other segment).

The road – in its entirety – is owned by Nassau County and maintained by the Nassau County Department of Public Works.

== Route description ==
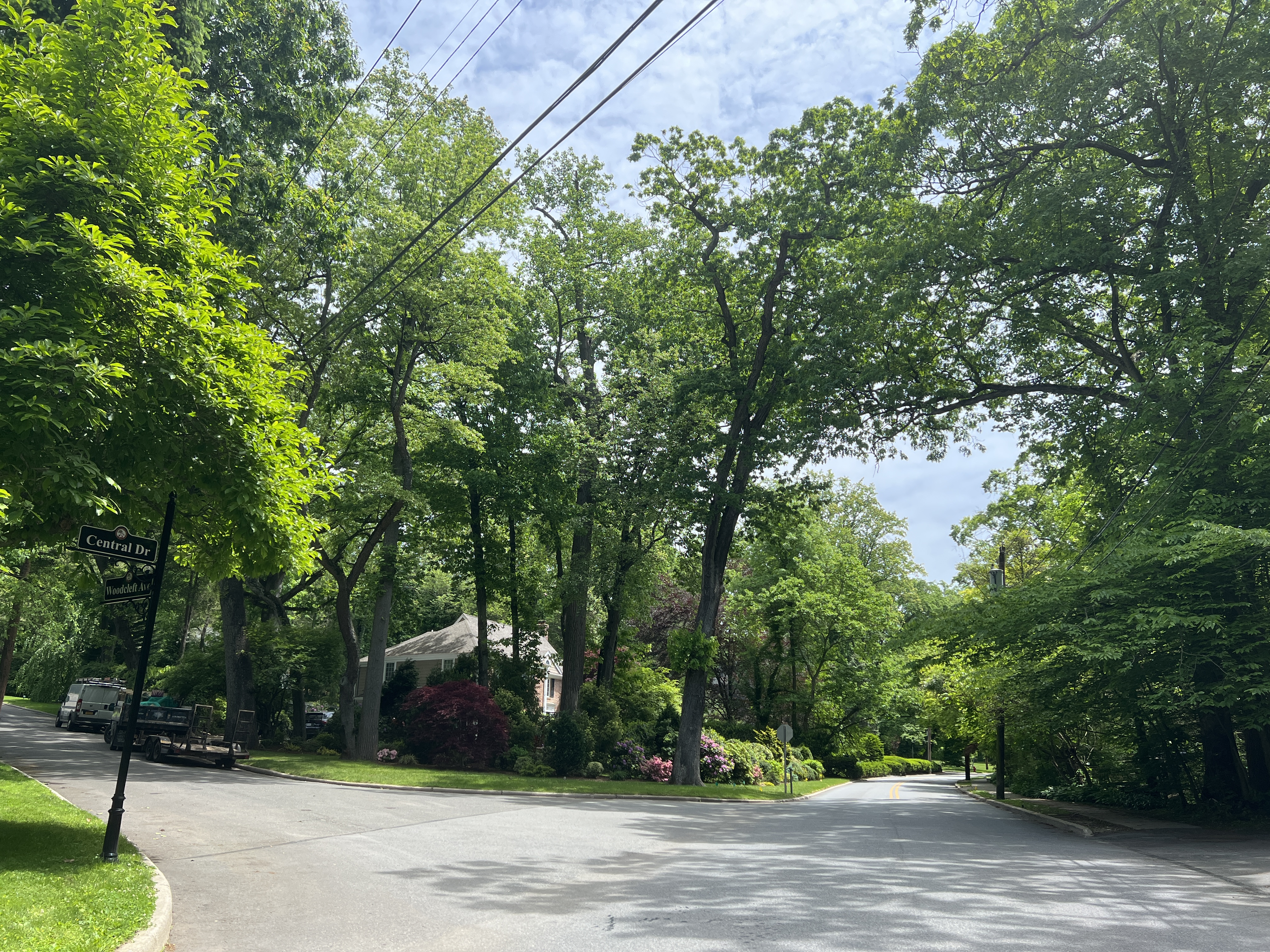
Central Drive at Woodcleft Avenue, 2022

Central Drive begins at Main Street, its eastern terminus. From there, it runs north, reaching Locust Avenue one block later. Central Drive then continues north and descends a steep hill, curving to the west. It crosses Baxter's Brook at the bottom of the hill, and the road then intersects Overlook Drive.

From Overlook Drive, Central Drive continues west while paralleling Baxter's Brook, winding its way through the heart of (and as the primary thoroughfare through) Baxter Estates, eventually reaching an intersection with Tianderah Road and Woodcleft Avenue. From this intersection, Central Drive continues meandering its way west through the village, forming the northern perimeter of Baxter's Pond County Park and Barbara Johnson County Preserve, to its intersection with Shore Road (CR E25); Central Drive and the CR C36 route designation terminate at this location.

The road is classified as a local road by the New York State Department of Transportation. The route is approximately 0.35 miles (0.56 km) in length.

== History ==
The former shield for CR 15A

In 1673, the "Cow Neck" homestead settlement – also known as the Baxter Homestead – was established by John Betts and Robert Hutchings. This settlement, located at the corner of Central Drive and Shore Road, was purchased by Oliver Baxter circa 1741, and it housed Hessian troops were during the American Revolutionary War.

In 2017, the Baxter Homestead – by then a designated local landmark – burned down in a major blaze after its owner announced plans to demolish the structure for a new house. The fire's cause was never determined.

=== Route number ===
In 1959, the Nassau County Department of Public Works created a numbered highway system as part of their "Master Plan" for the county highway system. As part of this plan, Central Drive was originally designated as County Route 15A – a child route to County Route 15, which then ran between Old Northern Boulevard in Roslyn and Manhasset Bay in Manorhaven via West Shore Road, Beacon Hill Road, Main Street, Shore Road, Manorhaven Boulevard, and Orchard Beach Road; Central Drive then intersected at both ends with CR 15.

As with all other county routes in Nassau County, CR 15A became unsigned in the 1970s, when Nassau County officials opted to remove the signs as opposed to allocating the funds for replacing them with new ones that met the latest federal design standards and requirements stated in the federal government's Manual on Uniform Traffic Control Devices.

After the route numbers in Nassau County were altered, Main Street (once part of CR 15) was purchased by the Town of North Hempstead, and County Route 15 was truncated at Port Washington Boulevard (NY 101). Central Drive was subsequently renumbered as one of two discontiguous segments of CR C36 – the other being Linden Boulevard / Central Avenue in Valley Stream.

== Major intersections ==
The entirety of Central Drive is located within the Village of Baxter Estates.

Location	mi	km	Destinations	Notes
Baxter Estates	0.00	0.00	Main Street	Eastern terminus
Baxter Estates	0.07	0.11	Locust Avenue	
Baxter Estates	0.2	0.32	Overlook Drive	
Baxter Estates	0.24	0.39	Tianderah Road / Woodcleft Avenue	
Baxter Estates	0.35	0.56	Shore Road (CR E25)	Western terminus
1.000 mi = 1.609 km; 1.000 km = 0.621 mi

== See also ==
- List of county routes in Nassau County, New York
- Middle Neck Road (Flower Hill, New York)
- Stonytown Road
