= Shore Road (Port Washington, New York) =

Road in the Greater Port Washington area of Nassau County, New York

- Shore Road (in red) and Old Shore Road (in blue)

Route information
- Maintained by NCDPW
- Length: 0.89 mi (1,430 m)

Major junctions
- South end: Main Street at the Baxter Estates–Port Washington border
- North end: Manorhaven Boulevard (CR D44); Cow Neck Road (CR C53); Sands Point Road intersection at the Manorhaven–Port Washington–Port Washington North border

Location
- Country: United States
- State: New York
- County: Nassau

Highway system
- County routes in New York; County Routes in Nassau County

Shore Road is a major north–south thoroughfare on the Cow Neck Peninsula in Nassau County, on the North Shore of Long Island, in New York, United States.

Owned by Nassau County and maintained by the Nassau County Department of Public Works as part of its county highway system, the entirety of the road is designated as of 2025 as a segment of the unsigned Nassau County Route E25.

== Route description ==
Shore Road begins at a signalized intersection with Main Street, at the border between Port Washington and the Incorporated Village of Baxter Estates. It then travels north–northwest along the coast of Manhasset Bay through Baxter Estates, passing Sunset Park, Baxter's Pond Park, and the Baxter Estates Village Beach, soon intersecting Central Drive (CR C36) at Baxter's Pond and thence Harbor Road (CR D07) at the Mill Pond. It then continues north–northwest along the shore, intersecting Mill Pond Road (CR D57) on the other side of the pond and entering the Incorporated Village of Port Washington North.

Upon entering Port Washington North, Shore Road – now separated from the shoreline by Bay Walk Park – continues north–northwest along the east edge of the park, until reaching Old Shore Road (CR D78). Shore Road then continues in the same direction, intersecting Pleasant Avenue (CR D93) one block later and briefly entering the Incorporated Village of Manorhaven. Continuing north–northwest, Shore Road passes the south end of Soundview Drive, straddles the border between Manorhaven and Port Washington North, and then intersecting Manhasset Avenue. Continuing north-northwest from there along the Manorhaven–Port Washington North border, the road then intersects the north end of Soundview Drive, before reaching its northern terminus at an intersection with Cow Neck Road (CR C53), Manorhaven Boulevard (CR D44), and Sands Point Road at the tripoint between the two villages and unincorporated Port Washington.

On the north side of the intersection at its northern terminus, Shore Road becomes the Town of North Hempstead-maintained Sands Point Road, continuing north to Middle Neck Road (CR D55) in the Incorporated Village of Sands Point.

Shore Road is classified as a minor arterial highway by the New York State Department of Transportation and is eligible for federal aid.

=== Old Shore Road ===
Old Shore Road is a short, 0.1-mile (0.16 km) road within Port Washington North, running from just north of Nassau Drive to Pleasant Avenue (CR D93); it is a remnant of Shore Road's former alignment at Cock's Corner. This alignment was bypassed in the 1940s, when Nassau County straightened and widened the highway. It is designated as the unsigned Nassau County Route D78, and – like Shore Road, itself – is owned and maintained by Nassau County.

Old Shore Road is classified as a local road by the New York State Department of Transportation.

== History ==
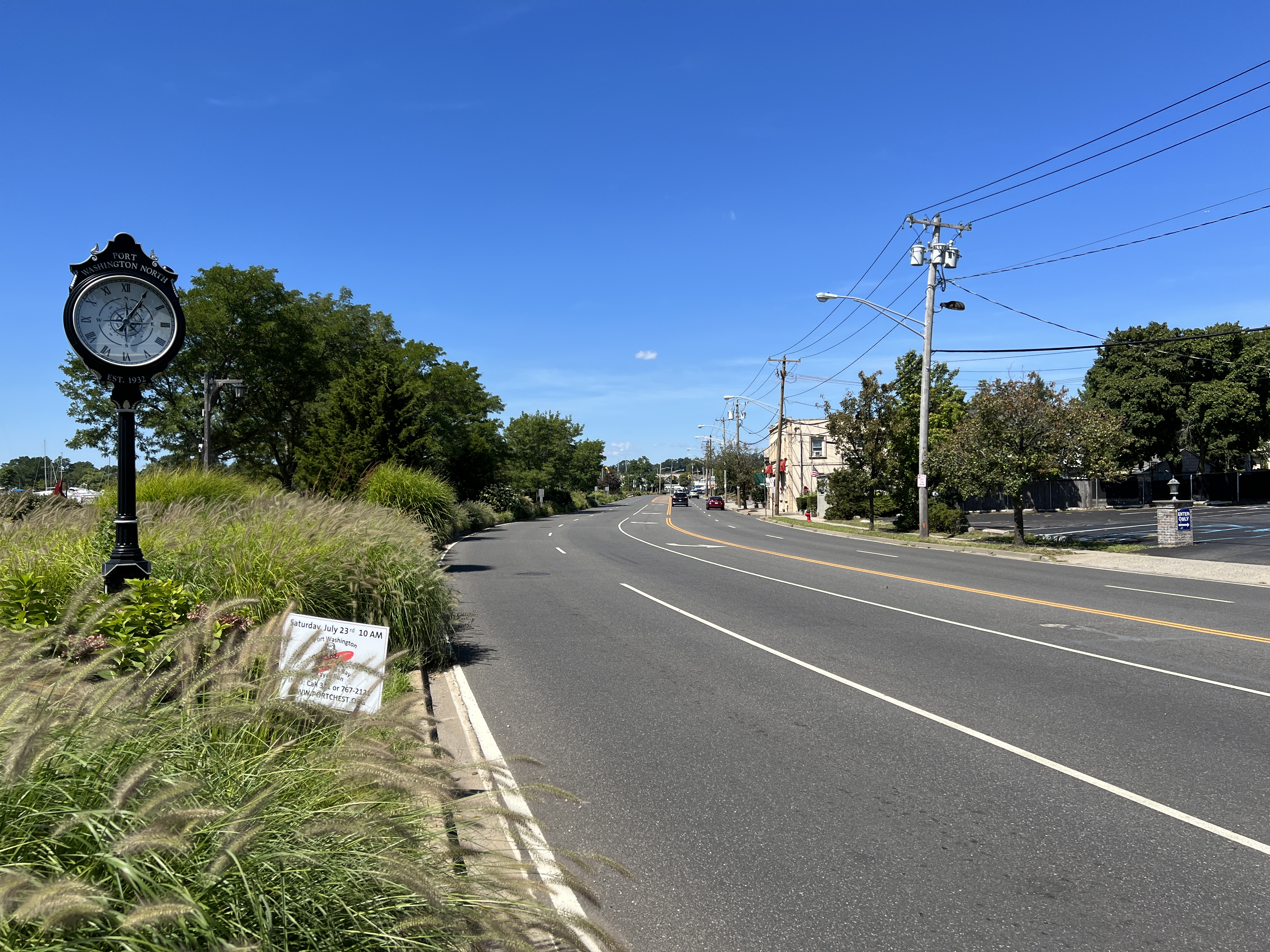
Shore Road within Port Washington North in 2022

In 1944, Nassau County announced that it would reconstruct Shore Road. As part of this project, the road would be widened to 70 feet (21 m) and be straightened, with dangerous curves – most notably the hairpin turn at Cock's Corner in Port Washington North – being eliminated. The project involved the use of eminent domain, and some structures – including the historic Gildo's Hotel at the corner of Shore Road and Mill Pond Drive in Port Washington North – were moved further back to accommodate the widened road while ensuring the structure's preservation. Work on the reconstruction project was performed by the White Plains Contracting Co., under a contract with the county A small portion of the bypassed original alignment at Cock's Corner would be retained between the new alignment and Prospect Avenue; it would be renamed Old Shore Road.

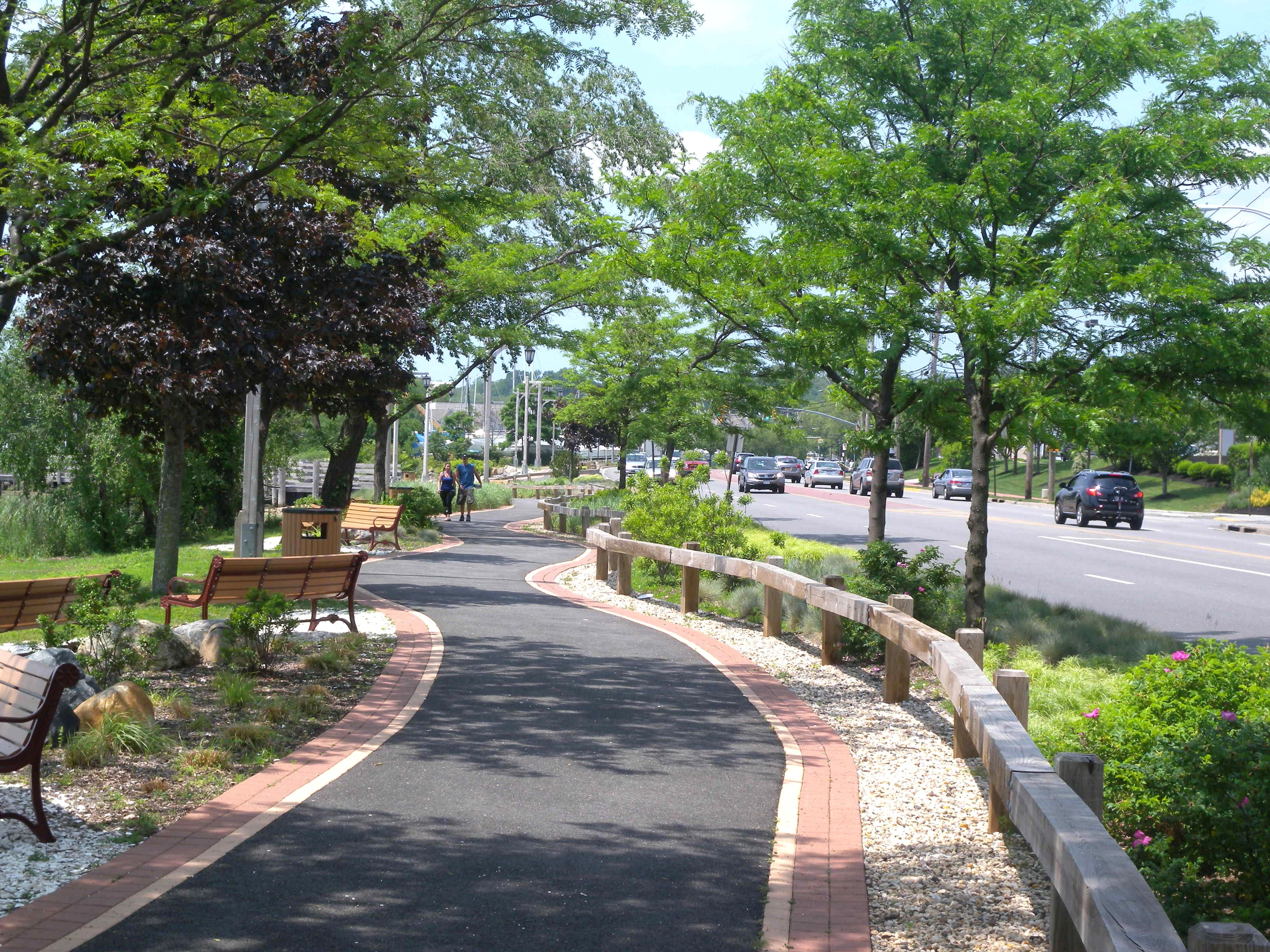
The pathway in Bay Walk Park, along Shore Road, in 2011

In the late 20th century and early 21st century, the shorefront along Shore Road within Port Washington North underwent significant redevelopment, with the village transforming it into the Bay Walk Park and Nautical Art Museum in a major, master-planned project executed in multiple phases, in collaboration with the Town of North Hempstead and numerous other municipalities. The park includes a major bicycle and walking path between the road and the shoreline.

In 2017, the 17th century-built Baxter Homestead – located along Shore Road in Baxter Estates and a designated landmark – burned down in a major blaze after its owner announced intentions to demolish the structure. The fire's cause was never determined.

In 2024, it was announced that the seawall along portions of Shore Road would be replaced, and that the shoreline along it would be reinforced. This project came after years of the road flooding after severe storms and defects in the seawall being discovered. The State of New York provided millions of dollars in funds to execute the project and create new recreational amenities – including a boardwalk over Manhasset Bay paralleling Shore Road in Baxter Estates between the Bay Walk Park and Sunset Park. Nassau County, which maintains the seawall, would also allocate a few million dollars for work on the project.

=== Route number ===
Beginning in 1959, when the Nassau County Department of Public Works created a numbered highway system as part of their "Master Plan" for the county highway system, Shore Road was originally designated as part of County Route 15, which ran between Old Northern Boulevard in Roslyn and Manhasset Bay in Manorhaven. This route, along with all of the other county routes in Nassau County, became unsigned in the 1970s, when Nassau County officials opted to remove the signs as opposed to allocating the funds for replacing them with new ones that met the latest federal design standards and requirements stated in the federal government's Manual on Uniform Traffic Control Devices.

After the route numbers in Nassau County were altered, Main Street (also once part of CR 15) was purchased by the Town of North Hempstead, and County Route 15 was truncated at Port Washington Boulevard (NY 101). Shore Road was subsequently renumbered as CR E25.

== Major intersections ==
Location	mi	km	Destinations	Notes
Baxter Estates–Port Washington line	0.00	0.00	Main Street	Southern terminus
Baxter Estates	0.21	0.34	Harbor Road (CR D07)	
Port Washington North	0.5	0.80	Old Shore Road (CR D78)	
Manorhaven–Port Washington North line	0.56	0.90	Pleasant Avenue (CR D93)	
Manorhaven–Port Washington North line	0.61	0.98	Soundview Drive	
Manorhaven–Port Washington North line	0.74	1.19	Manhasset Avenue	
Manorhaven–Port Washington North line	0.84	1.35	Soundview Drive	
Manorhaven–Port Washington– Port Washington North tripoint	0.89	1.43	Manorhaven Boulevard	Northern terminus; roadway continues north as town-owned Sands Point Road
1.000 mi = 1.609 km; 1.000 km = 0.621 mi

== Transportation ==
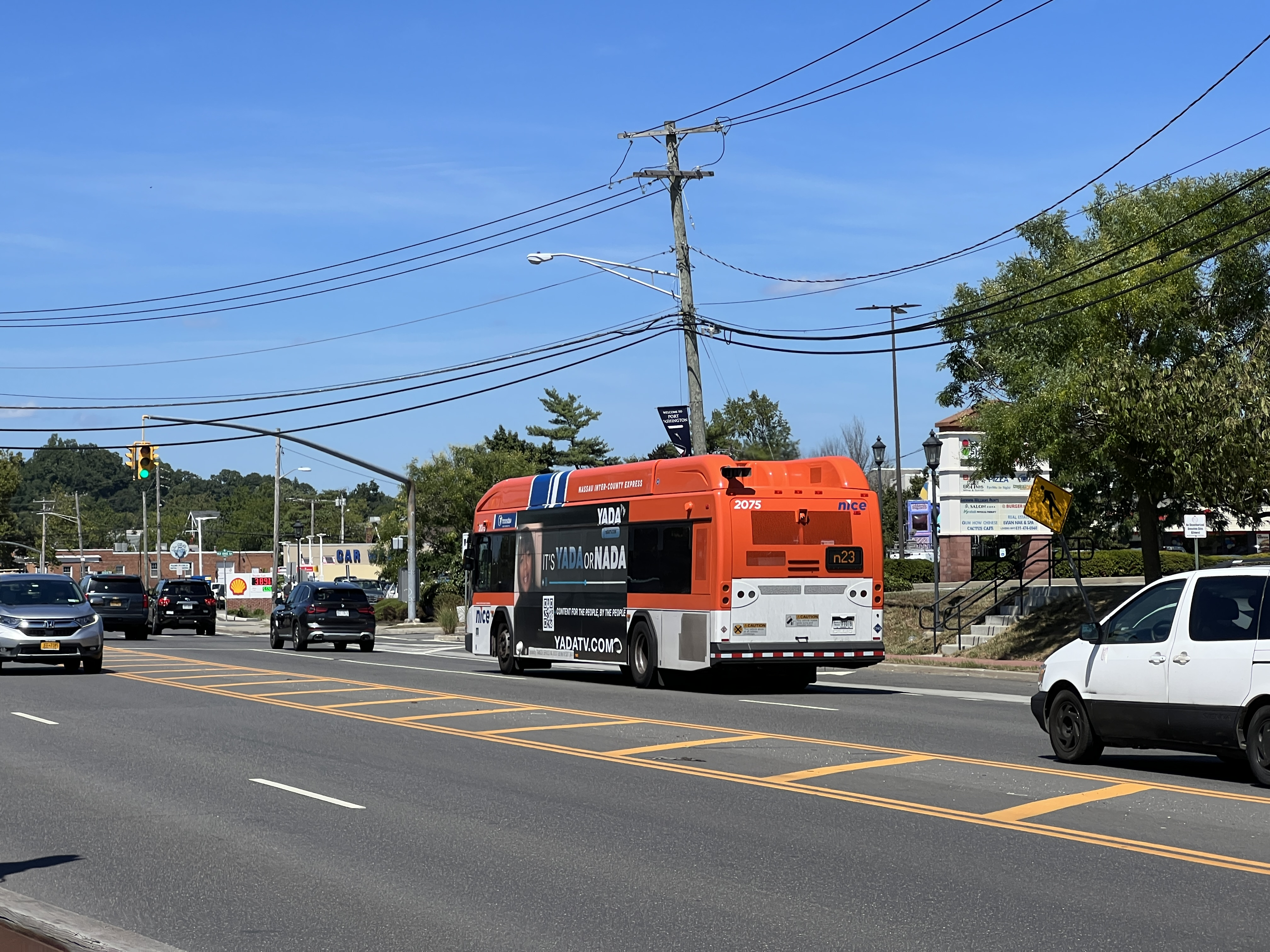
A Manorhaven-bound n23 bus on Shore Road in 2022

As of July 2025, two Nassau Inter-County Express bus routes travel along – and serve the corridor along – Shore Road: the n23 and the Port Washington Shuttle.

== Landmarks ==
- The Baxter Homestead once stood along Shore Road in Baxter Estates.

== Notable residents ==
- Tallulah Bankhead – actress.
- Addison Mizner – architect especially well-known for his many works and cultural influence in South Florida.

== See also ==
- List of county routes in Nassau County, New York
- County Route 15 (Nassau County, New York)
- Plandome Road
