= Port Washington Police District =

Law enforcement agency in Nassau County, New York, United States

- Official Emblem of the PWPD
- Common name: Port Washington Police; Port Police
- Abbreviation: PWPD

Agency overview
- Formed: November 1921
- Employees: 87

Jurisdictional structure
- Operations jurisdiction: United States
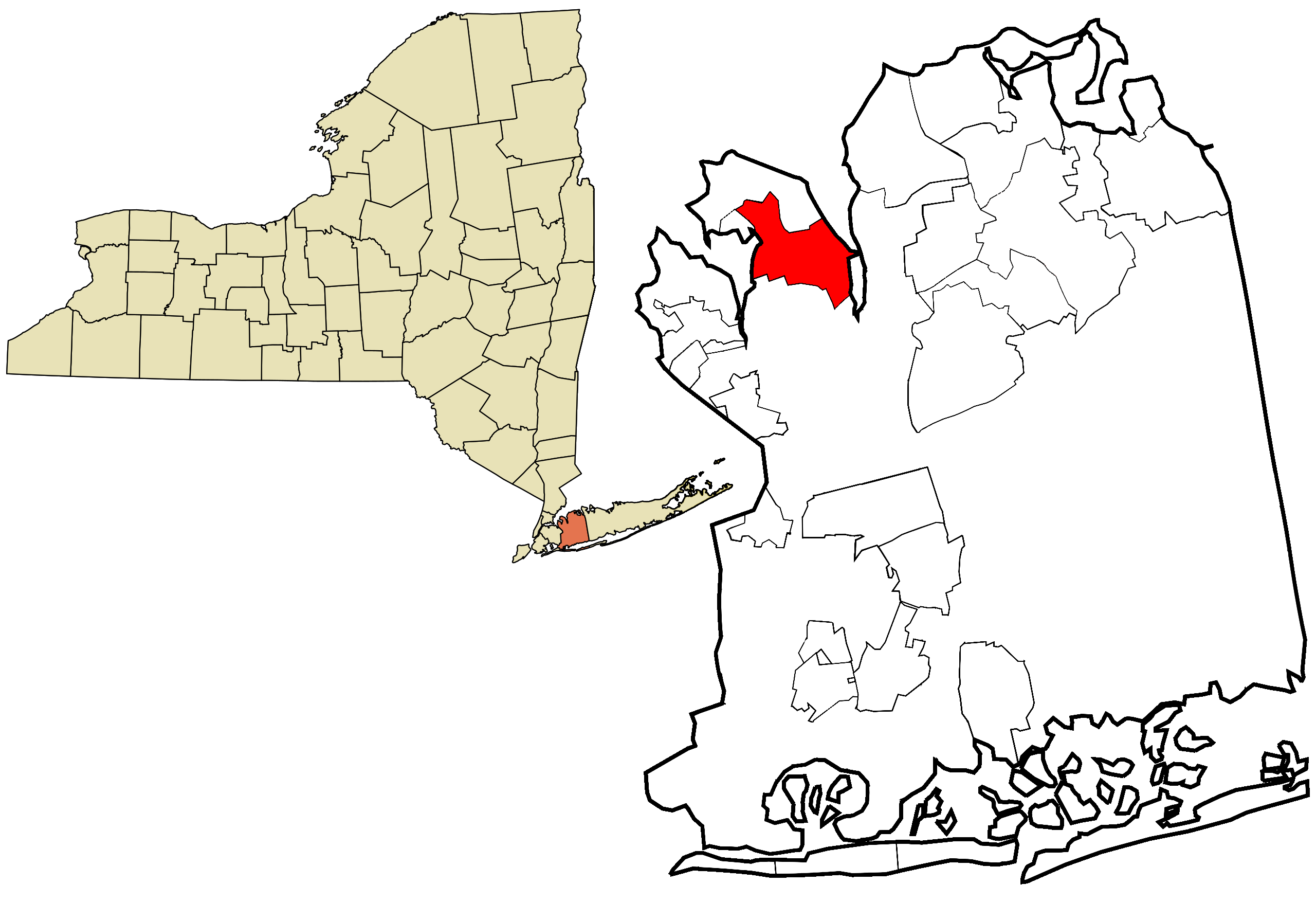
- Map of Port Washington Police District's jurisdiction
- Population: ~30,000
- Legal jurisdiction: Much of the Greater Port Washington area
- General nature: Local civilian police

Operational structure
- Headquarters: 500 Port Washington Boulevard, Port Washington, NY 11050
- Police officers: 63 (2021)
- Agency executive: Robert Del Muro, Chief

Facilities
- Stations: 1
- Vehicles: 37 (2021)

Website
- portwashingtonpd.ny.gov

The Port Washington Police District (also known as the Port Washington Police & Port Police and abbreviated as PWPD) is a police district serving portions of the Town of North Hempstead in Nassau County, Long Island, New York, United States. It is the law enforcement agency serving the Incorporated Villages of Baxter Estates and Port Washington North – as well as nearly all of the hamlet and census-designated place (CDP) of Port Washington – with police protection.

The PWPD is the only special police district in New York state.

== History ==
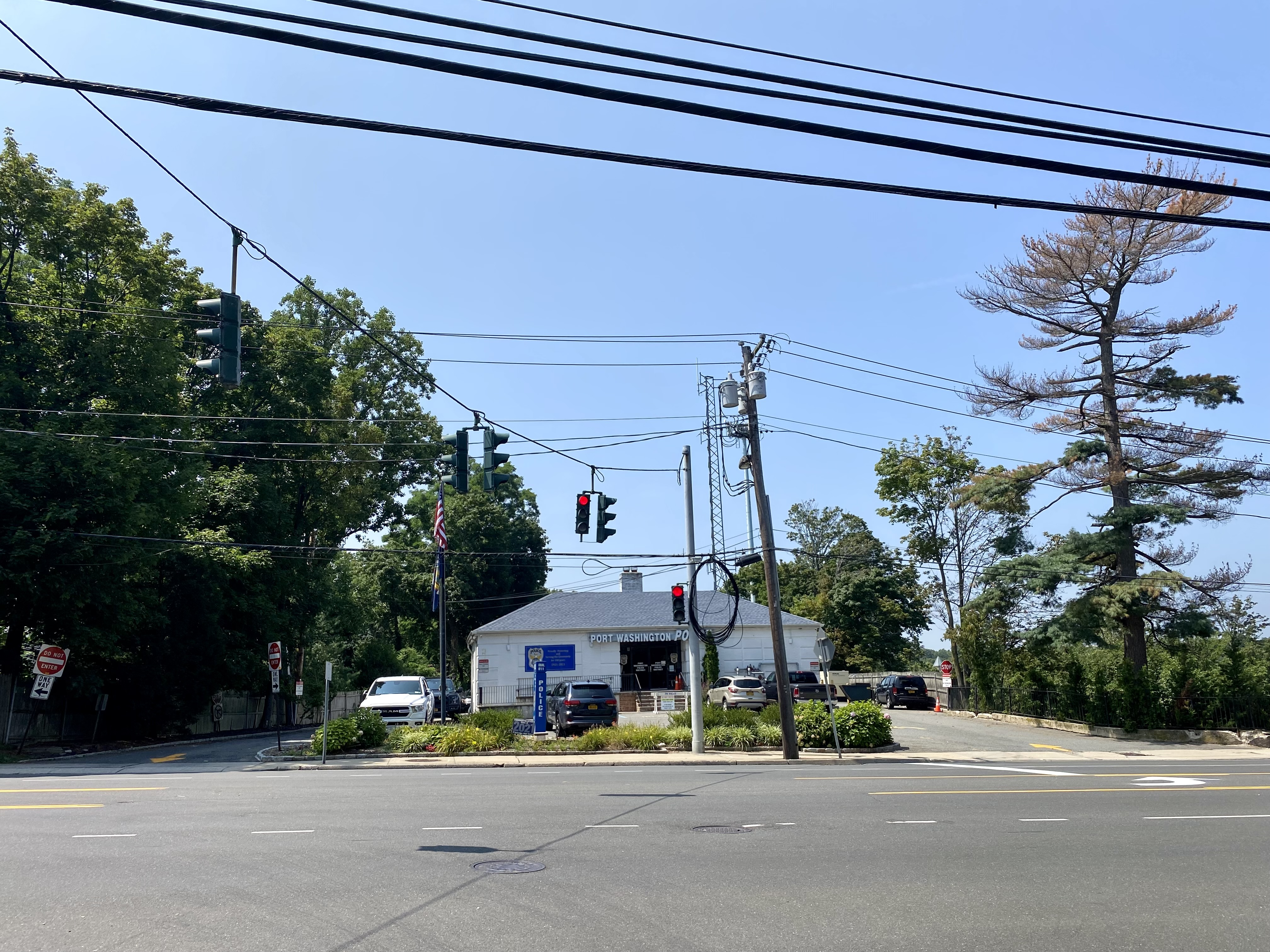
The Port Washington Police District Headquarters in August 2021

The Port Washington Police District was established in November 1921, after an uptick in burglaries plagued the Greater Port Washington area, and in response to needing better police protection in the growing community, more generally. The first day of operations was January 1, 1922.

In 1925, the creation of the Nassau County Police Department led to the New York State Attorney General Albert Ottinger voicing his opinion that all other special police districts in Nassau County be eliminated in favor of the NCPD. The issue, which involved concerns of being double-taxed over police protection, led to the budget being held up that year.

In 1933, the PWPD was officially recognized and legislated after the majority of voters in the Town of North Hempstead voted 4,086-to-2,221 in favor of keeping the district; the vote occurred on August 2, 1933.

On May 28, 1934, Governor Herbert Lehman authorized the town board to appoint commissioners; the control over the district would then be given by the town board to the commissioners. It was on that day when the PWPD was declared a separate unit.

In 1945, the Port Washington Police Athletic League was established.

In 1979, the Nassau County District Attorney investigated the PWPD after the police chief revealed that the commissioner had been allowed to remain in his position despite failing the civil service exam three times.

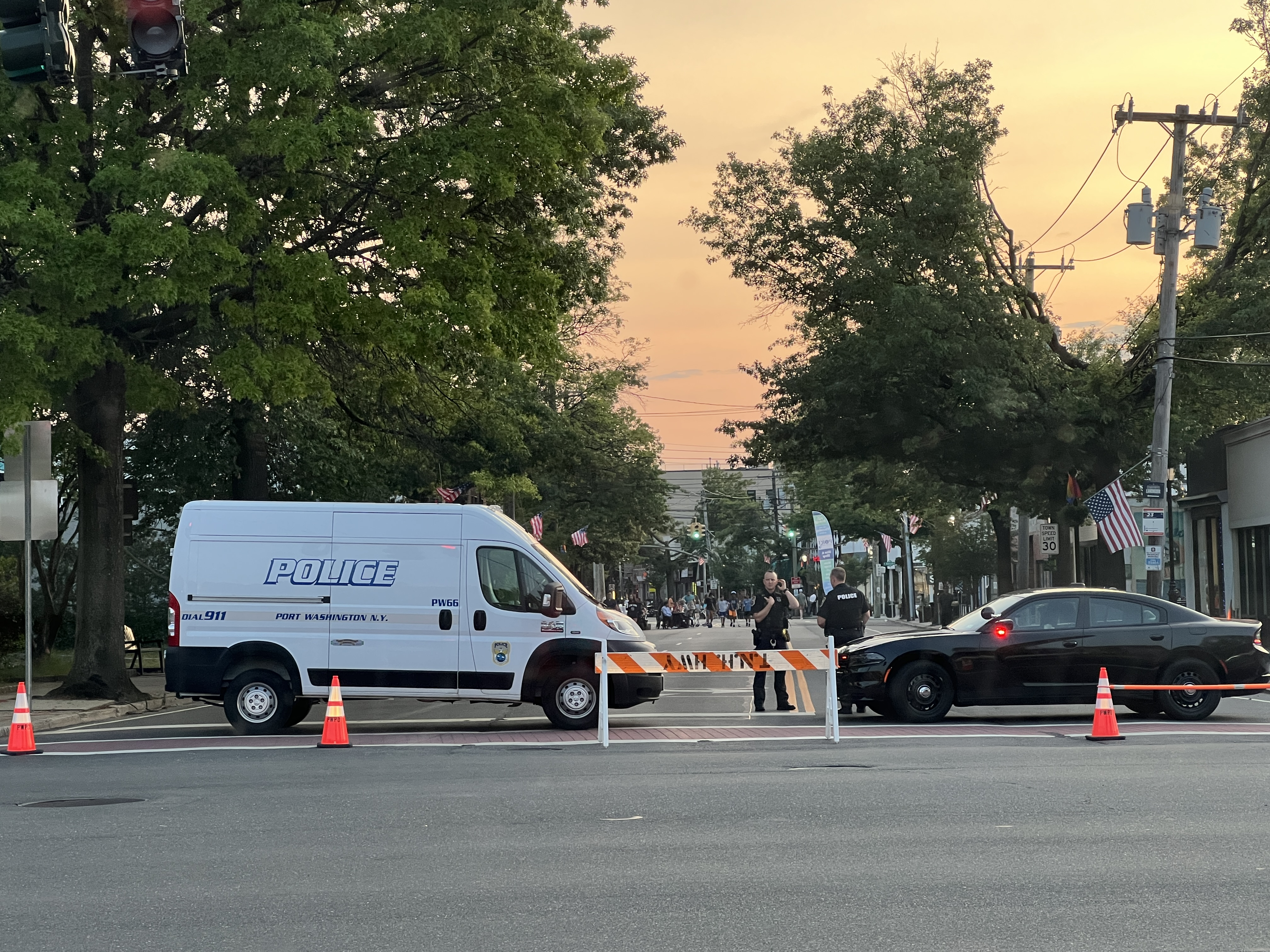
PWPD vehicles and officers on Main Street during a street festival in June 2023

In 1984, residents and officials in the Incorporated Village of Manorhaven debated whether or not the village should join the Port Washington Police District. If approved, the Port Washington Police District would have taken over the police services within the village from the Nassau County Police Department. Those in favor of the plan felt that the Port Washington Police District would be able to better serve the needs of the village, while opponents had concerns over potential tax increases as a result of joining the district. Ultimately, Manorhaven decided to remain under the jurisdiction of the Nassau County Police Department, which, as of 2022, continues to provide the village with its police services.

Manorhaven had previously debated the same issue of whether or not to replace the NCPD with the PWPD in 1948; the outcome in 1948 was the same as the outcome in 1984, with the majority of village voters opting not to join the PWPD.

In the 1990s, the PWPD faced a series of lawsuits over gender and racial discrimination in hiring and promoting.

In 2020, district voters elected Brian G. Staley, Sr. as Police Commissioner; Staley became the first African American to serve on the district's Board of Commissioners.

In 2021, the Port Washington Police District celebrated its centennial.

In 2022, the district received a state grant for implementation of license plate reading devices.

In 2025, preparation work for the construction of the Port Washington Police District's new headquarters on Main Street, in the heart of Port Washington's downtown, commenced; the work included the demolition of all seven existing structures on the property – including a funeral home – that November. The new facilities are designed by H2M Architects & Engineers, and will provide the district with modern facilities and increased capacity. Work on constructing the new, $32 million facility is expected to commence in spring 2026. Following completion of the new headquarters, the existing facility on Port Washington Boulevard – which has been noted as being outdated and functionally obsolete – will be sold and repurposed.

== Administration ==
As of February 2024, the Port Washington Police District's Chief of Police is Robert Del Muro, and the police district's Board of Commissioners consists of Angela Lawlor Mullins, JB Meyer, and Sean McCarthy.

== Statistics ==
As of 2021, the Port Washington Police District has 63 sworn police officers, 13 school crossing guards, three police dispatchers, one parking meter attendant, one school resource officer, and four civilian personnel – in addition to a traffic safety enforcement unit, narcotics unit, a juvenile aid bureau, a motorcycle unit, a bicycle unit, a detective division, and a community liaison; the department, as of 2021, employs a total of 87 people.

Furthermore, as of 2021, the Port Washington Police District operates a fleet of 37 police vehicles – including two motorcycle units.

== Fallen officers ==
Since its inception in 1921, the Port Washington Police District has had one fatality. Officer Elbert Stuyvesant died in the line of duty while trying to rescue a man at a Baxter Estates home on July 8, 1924. His death was caused by toxins emanating from the home's cesspool.

== See also ==
- List of law enforcement agencies in New York
- List of Long Island law enforcement agencies
- Port Washington Parking District
- Special districts in New York (state)
