= Main Street (Port Washington, New York) =

Road in Port Washington, New York

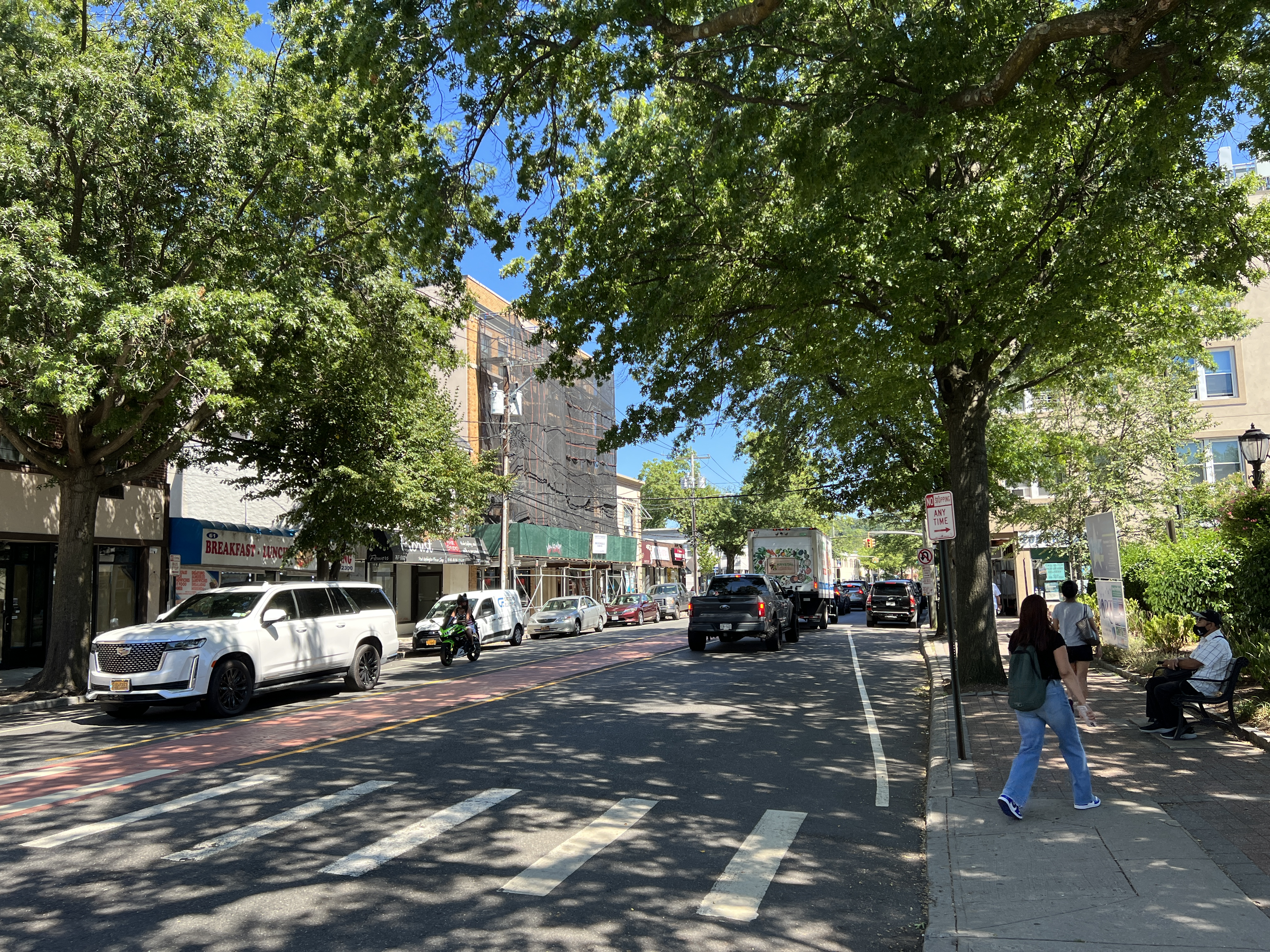
- Main Street in 2022
- Type: Minor Arterial
- Maintained by: Town of North Hempstead Department of Public Works
- Length: 1.20 mi (1.93 km)
- Location: Port Washington, New York; Baxter Estates, New York
- West end: North Plandome Road in Port Washington
- Major junctions: Shore Road (CR E25) at the Port Washington–Baxter Estates line Central Drive (CR C36) at the Port Washington–Baxter Estates line South Bayles Avenue in Port Washington
- East end: NY 101 (Port Washington Boulevard) in Port Washington

Main Street, highlighted in red

Main Street (formerly known as Flower Hill Avenue) is the primary east–west road running through – and serving – downtown Port Washington, on the Cow Neck Peninsula in Nassau County, on Long Island, in New York, United States.

== Route description ==
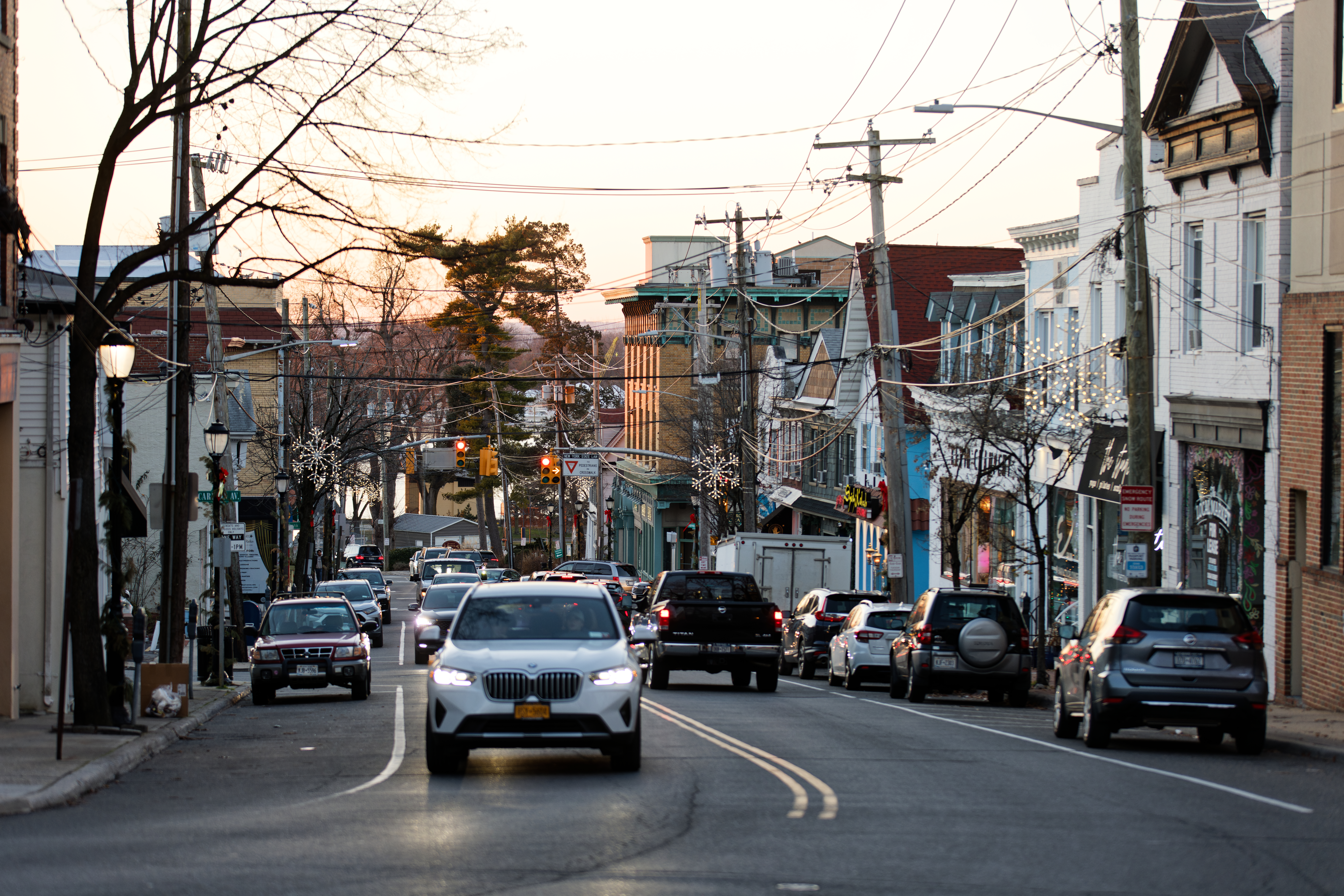
Main Street, as seen from its intersection with High Street in 2024

From its west end, Main Street begins at Fifth Avenue in Port Washington, as a continuation of North Plandome Road. From there, it crosses Stannard's Brook and heads north, entering Port Washington's downtown. Upon passing the North Hempstead Town Dock, the road makes a sharp curve to the east, adjacent to Sunset Park. It then continues east, intersecting with Shore Road (CR E25) and forming the border between Port Washington and the Incorporated Village of Baxter Estates. It then continues east along the border to High Street, where it bends to the southeast before immediately bending back to the east – all still along the border – and passing the Port Washington Public Library and the historic Main Street School before reaching Central Drive (CR C36).

From Central Drive, Main Street continues east along the border to Mackey Avenue. Heading further east from there, Main Street is soon – once again – entirely within Port Washington, and it eventually intersects Haven Avenue, where access is provided to the adjacent Port Washington LIRR station. It then intersects Herbert Avenue, in front of the station, before intersecting South Bayles Avenue immediately thereafter; this intersection provides additional access to the train station. From here, Main Street continues east and eventually intersects Port Washington Boulevard (New York State Route 101).

East of its intersection with NY 101, Main Street becomes LuEsther T. Mertz Plaza, running 0.04 miles (0.064 km) east – adjacent to the Port Washington Post Office, before terminating at a dead-end at the entrance to a retail center parking lot; this 200-foot (61 m) was previously known as Main Street.

Main Street is classified as a minor arterial highway by the New York State Department of Transportation and is eligible for federal aid.

== History ==
What is now Main Street was originally known as Flower Hill Avenue; the name was changed to Main Street in 1912. 14 years prior to this renaming, the Long Island Rail Road's Port Washington Branch was extended to its present terminal on the south side of the street; it previously terminated at the Great Neck station in Great Neck Plaza. The opening of the Port Washington extension ushered rapid growth along Main Street and across the rest of the Port Washington area and Cow Neck.

The Port Washington Line of the New York and North Shore Traction Company's trolley system used to run along a significant portion of Main Street during the early 20th century, connecting the community with Roslyn and Mineola. This trolley line was constructed in 1907 and opened in 1908. These trolleys ceased to operate in 1920, upon the company's demise.

In 1936, during the Great Depression, the federal government allocated $1,685.50 in funds for excavating Main Street and laying new pipes under it, as part of a Works Progress Administration project. The Port Washington Post Office, located at the northeastern corner of NY 101 and LuEsther T. Mertz Plaza opened one year prior – a project also funded as part of the New Deal; WPA murals would also be installed inside the building.

In the 1950s, a proposal was made to redevelop the portion of Main Street adjacent to the Port Washington station – and to replace the existing terminal. Under this project, the existing station would have been demolished, with a large, new commercial development being erected along Main Street; a new station facility would have been integrated into the new commercial block along Main Street. This proposal was ultimately called off, and the original station house remains standing to this day.

In 1991, the 0.04-mile (0.064 km) stretch of road between Main Street's current eastern terminus at NY 101 and the dead-end to its east was renamed LuEsther T. Mertz Plaza.

In the 2010s, Main Street was redesigned and modernized to stimulate additional growth along the corridor – the main route through Port Washington's central business district. In 2018, construction began on improving the road in the vicinity of the LIRR station. In addition to improvements to traffic flow, the project included the creation of improved pedestrian and bicycling facilities along Main Street – along with the installation of brick pavers, greenery, and other beautification work to create a vibrant streetscape. The sidewalks and curbs along this stretch of the road were also demolished and rebuilt.

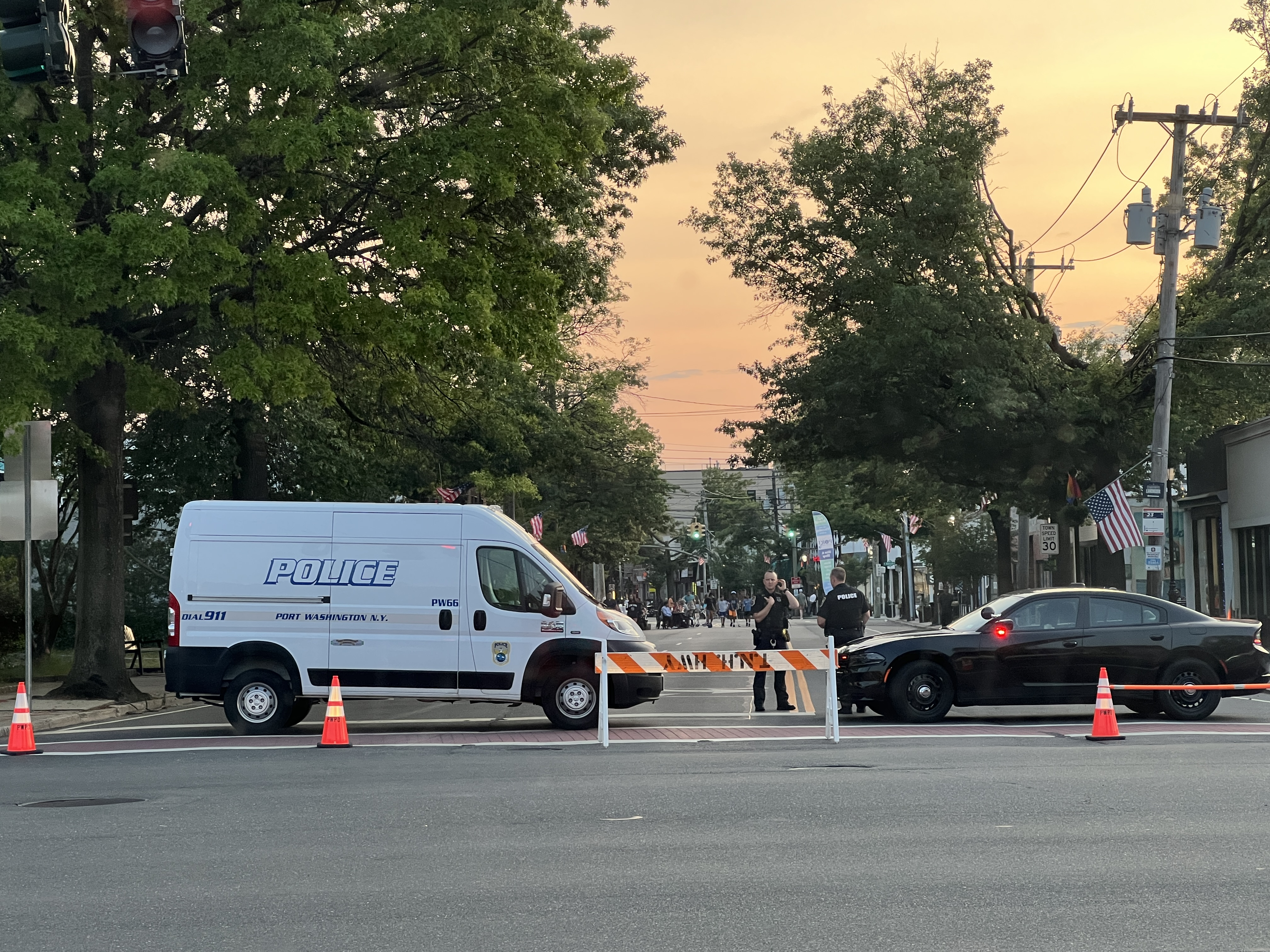
Police blocking off Main Street from vehicular traffic at NY 101 for the Port Promenade Street Fair in 2023

In the summer of 2020, during the COVID-19 pandemic, civic leaders and officials temporarily closed portions of Main Street to vehicular traffic to create an outdoor retail and dining event, as part of an initiative started by the Town of North Hempstead to help businesses during the lockdowns. Known as the "Port Promenade Street Fair," this event – similar to an eponymous event on Main Street from the 20th century – would see vendors and restaurants set up pavilions and seating on the road, for use by the public; the designated areas of Main Street, during the event, would be open solely to pedestrians. The event proved popular, and it became an annual tradition. By 2025, the Port Promenade Street Fair would begin to be held twice yearly, sponsored by the Greater Port Washington Business Improvement District.

In 2023, the Port Washington Police District announced that it would relocate its headquarters to a new facility on Main Street. Construction is set to begin in the fall of 2025.

=== Former county route designation ===
Main Street was formerly owned and maintained by Nassau County.

Former route shield for Nassau County Route 15

Beginning in 1959, when the Nassau County Department of Public Works created a numbered highway system as part of their "Master Plan" for the county highway system, Main Street was designated as part of County Route 15, which ran between Old Northern Boulevard in Roslyn and Manhasset Bay in Manorhaven. This route, along with all of the other county routes in Nassau County, became unsigned in the 1970s, when Nassau County officials opted to remove the signs instead of allocating the funds to replace them with new ones that met the latest federal design standards and requirements stated in the federal government's Manual on Uniform Traffic Control Devices.

After the route numbers in Nassau County were altered, ownership of Main Street (also once part of CR 15) was transferred to the Town of North Hempstead, by Nassau County and the County Route 15 designation was truncated at Beacon Hill Road's western terminus at Port Washington Boulevard (NY 101).

== Major intersections ==
Location	mi	km	Destinations	Notes
Port Washington	0.53	0.85	North Plandome Road and Fifth Avenue	Western terminus; roadway continues south as North Plandome Road; continuation of North Plandome Road's mileage scheme
Port Washington–Baxter Estates line	1.04 0.00	1.67 0.00	Shore Road (CR E25)	Mileage resets
Port Washington–Baxter Estates line	0.09	0.14	High Street	
Port Washington–Baxter Estates line	0.41	0.66	Central Drive (CR C36)	
Port Washington–Baxter Estates line	0.47	0.76	Mackey Avenue	
Port Washington	0.60	0.97	Haven Avenue	Access to the Port Washington LIRR station
Port Washington	0.63	1.01	Herbert Avenue	
Port Washington	0.69	1.11	South Bayles Avenue	Access to the Port Washington LIRR station
Port Washington	0.83	1.34	NY 101 (Port Washington Boulevard)	At-grade intersection; eastern terminus of Main Street; roadway continues east for 0.04 miles (0.064 km) using Main Street's mileage scheme as LuEsther T. Mertz Plaza
1.000 mi = 1.609 km; 1.000 km = 0.621 mi: Route transition

== Landmarks ==
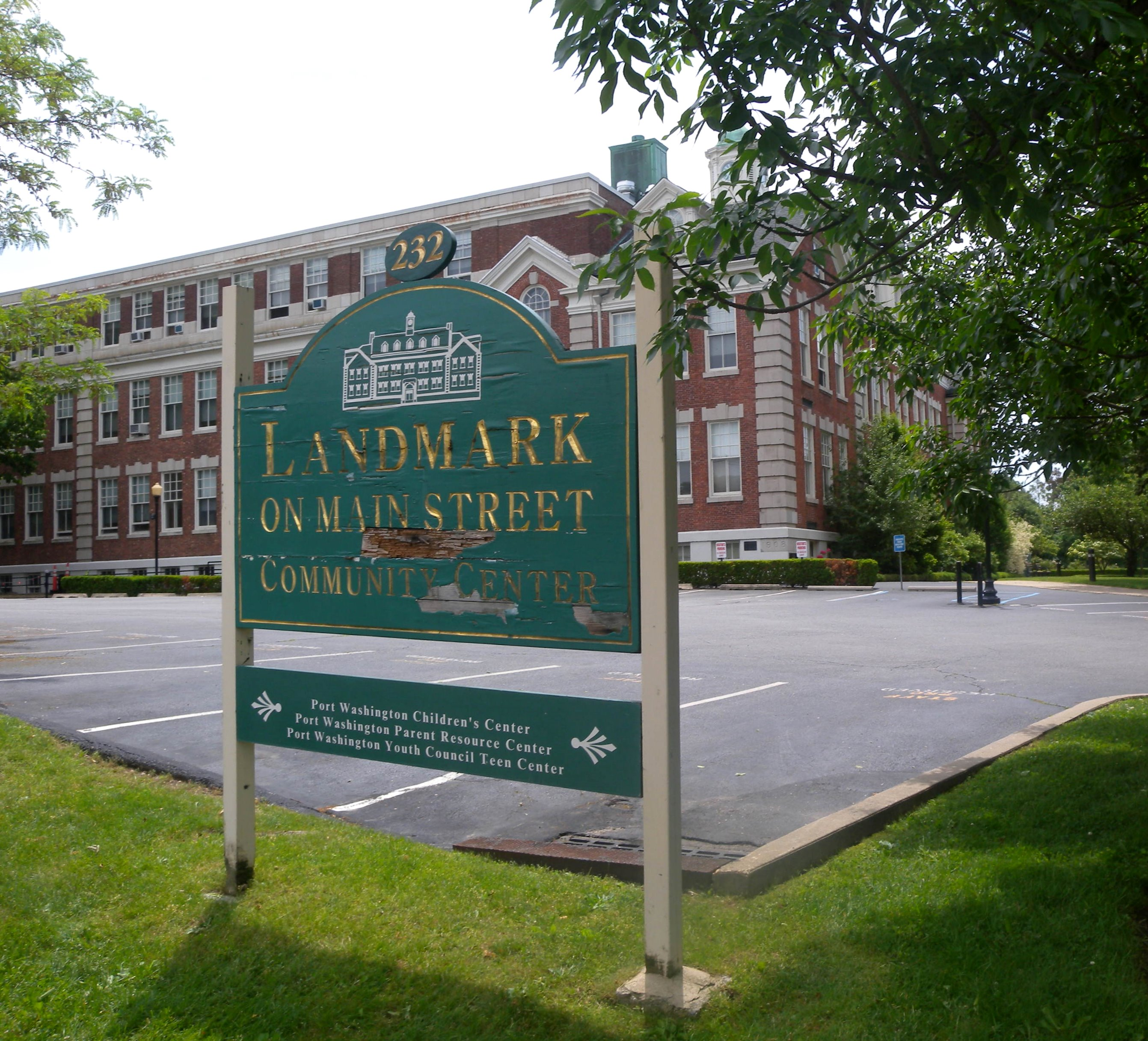
The Main Street School, as seen from Main Street

- The Main Street School is located along Main Street; it is listed on the National Register of Historic Places and the New York State Register of Historic Places, and is additionally a Town of North Hempstead Designated Landmark.
- The Main Street Historic District – a historic district designated by the Village of Baxter Estates – stretches along a section of the north side of Main Street in Baxter Estates, in the vicinity of Shore Road.

== In popular culture ==
- Locations along Main street was used as filming locations for scenes in the 2000 movie, Meet the Parents.

== See also ==
- Stonytown Road
- County Route 15 (Nassau County, New York)
- Transportation on Long Island
