= County Route 15 (Nassau County, New York) =

County highway in Nassau County, New York, US

- CR 15 highlighted in red

Route information
- Maintained by NCDPW
- Length: 4.02 mi (6.47 km)
- Existed: 1959–present

Major junctions
- North end: NY 101 in Port Washington
- South end: Old Northern Boulevard (CR 7A; CR D71) in Roslyn

Location
- Country: United States
- State: New York
- County: Nassau

Highway system
- County routes in New York; County Routes in Nassau County

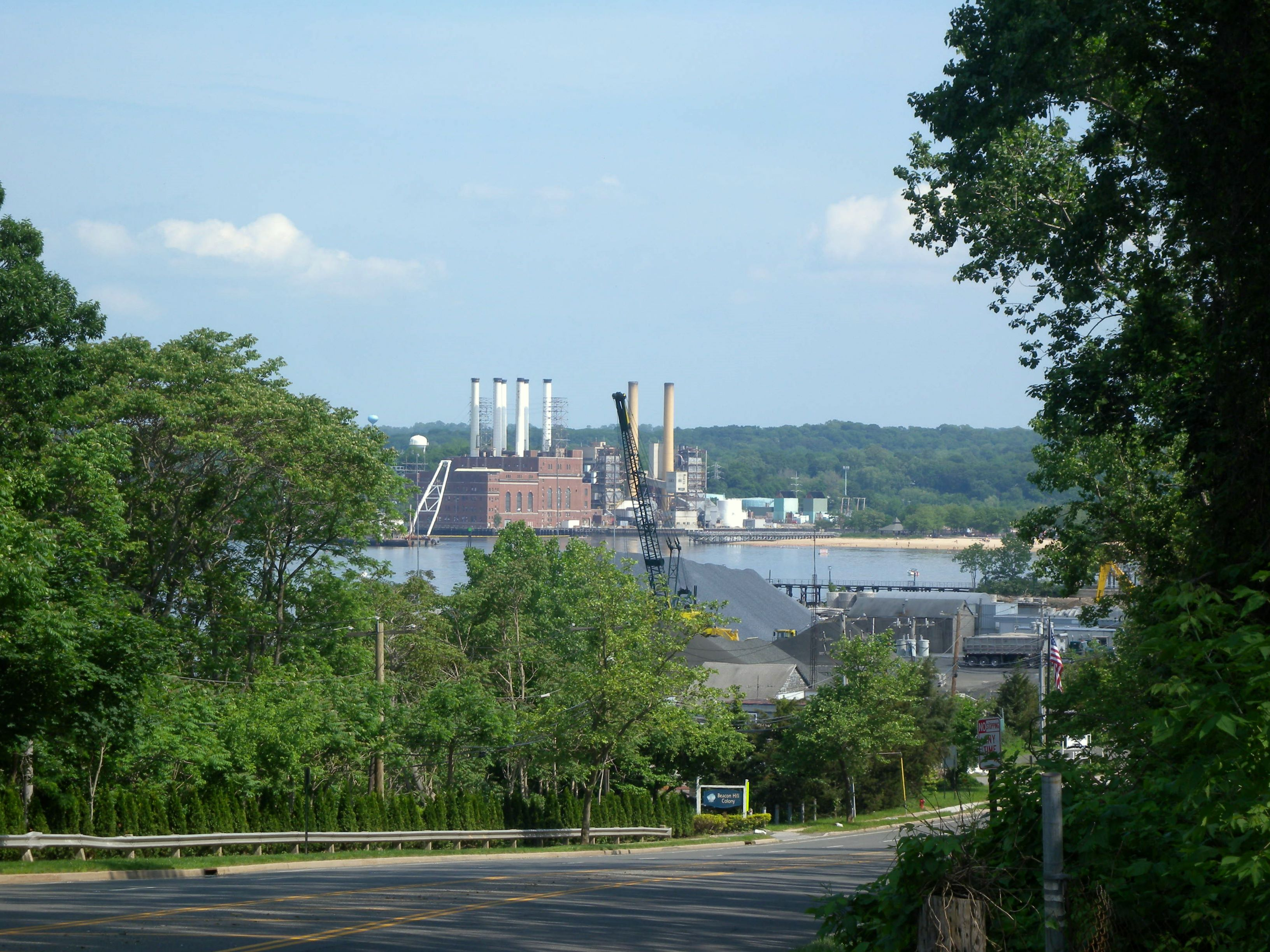
West Shore Road (CR 15), looking southeast towards Hempstead Harbor

Nassau County Route 15 is a 4.02-mile (6.47 km), unsigned county road in Nassau County, on Long Island, in New York, United States. It travels between Port Washington Boulevard (NY 101) in the hamlet of Port Washington at its northern end and Old Northern Boulevard (CR D71 / CR 7A) in the Village of Roslyn at its southern end. A small portion of the road also passes through the Village of Flower Hill.

County Route 15 travels along Beacon Hill Road and West Shore Road (also known as Roslyn West Shore Road), and is maintained in its entirety by the Nassau County Department of Public Works.

== Route description ==
The former shield for CR 15

Starting at its northern end, County Route 15 begins in Port Washington, at the intersection of Beacon Hill Road, Main Street, and Port Washington Boulevard (NY 101). From there, it continues east-southeast through the Beacon Hill section of Port Washington, along Beacon Hill Road. It then descends from the top of Beacon Hill, makes a sharp turn to the south, and becomes West Shore Road, paralleling the western shore of Hempstead Harbor. CR 15 then becomes a divided highway and passes the North Hempstead Beach Park (also known as Bar Beach) and the Harbor Links Country Club. Continuing south, the road soon becomes undivided once again, and it soon thereafter passes the Town of North Hempstead's landfill and its solid waste management center, the Hempstead Harbor Shoreline Park, and the Seaview & Harbor Park industrial parks. Shortly thereafter, CR 15 enters the Village of Flower Hill, soon reaching the village's Harbor Village housing development and intersecting with John Bean Court. From there, CR 15 continues south through Flower Hill, passes underneath the William Cullen Bryant Viaduct (NY 25A), and then enters the Village of Roslyn immediately thereafter. Just south of the viaduct, CR 15 passes Mott Avenue (CR D63), and then intersects with Old Northern Boulevard (CR D71 / CR 7A), where it terminates.

County Route 15 is classified as a minor arterial highway by the New York State Department of Transportation and is eligible for federal aid. The route is approximately 4.02 miles (6.47 km) in length.

== History ==
The CR 15 designation for West Shore and Beacon Hill Roads can be traced back to 1959, when the Nassau County Department of Public Works created a numbered highway system as part of their "Master Plan" for the county highway system. This plan marked CR 15 along its current alignment – and continuing further north and west to Manorhaven, via Main Street in Port Washington, Shore Road, Manorhaven Boulevard, and Orchard Beach Road.

Like all other county routes in Nassau County, County Route 15 became unsigned in the 1970s, when Nassau County officials opted to remove the signs as opposed to allocating the funds for replacing them with new ones that met the latest federal design standards and requirements, as per the federal government's Manual on Uniform Traffic Control Devices.

Following the discontinuation of route number signage, CR 15 was truncated at NY 101 – its current northern terminus, while the remaining portions were either re-numbered and remained part of the county's system or saw their ownership be transferred to the Town of North Hempstead.

=== Landmarks ===
The historic George W. Denton House is located along CR 15, in Flower Hill. It is listed on both the New York State Register of Historic Places and the National Register of Historic Places; it is also designated as a Village of Flower Hill Historic Landmark and is covenanted by the Roslyn Landmark Society.

== Major intersections ==
| Location | mi | km | Destinations | Notes |
|---|---|---|---|---|
| Roslyn | 0.00 | 0.00 | Old Northern Boulevard (CR 7A; CR D71) | Southern terminus; continues south as Old Northern Boulevard |
| Flower Hill | 0.26 | 0.42 | John Bean Court | |
| Port Washington | 2.99 | 4.81 | Marginal Drive | |
| Port Washington | 3.26 | 5.25 | Beacon Drive | Transition from West Shore Road to Beacon Hill Road |
| Port Washington | 3.34 | 5.38 | Hillcrest Road; Summit Road | |
| Port Washington | 3.57 | 5.75 | Crescent Road | |
| Port Washington | 4.02 | 6.47 | NY 101 (Port Washington Boulevard) – Flower Hill, Sands Point | At-grade intersection; northern terminus |
1.000 mi = 1.609 km; 1.000 km = 0.621 mi: Route transition

== Transportation ==
As of December 2025, one Nassau Inter-County Express bus route travels – and serves the corridor – along CR 15: the Port Washington Shuttle; this service typically operates during the AM and PM rush hours.

== Former CR 15A ==
County Route C36
- Location: Baxter Estates
- Length: 0.52 mi (840 m)

Central Drive is a county road located entirely within the Incorporated Village of Baxter Estates. It is currently designated as one of two discontiguous segments of the unsigned Nassau County Route C36 (with Linden Boulevard / Central Avenue in Valley Stream), and was formerly designated as Nassau County Route 15A.

The road begins at Main Street, its eastern terminus. From there, it continues north and west, winding its way through the heart of Baxter Estates, to its intersection with Shore Road (CR E25), at which point the street terminates.

== See also ==
- List of county routes in Nassau County, New York
- Hempstead Harbor
- Shore Road (Port Washington, New York)
