= Circuit 69-485 =

Great Neck to Port Washington Overhead Transmission Line Circuit 69-485
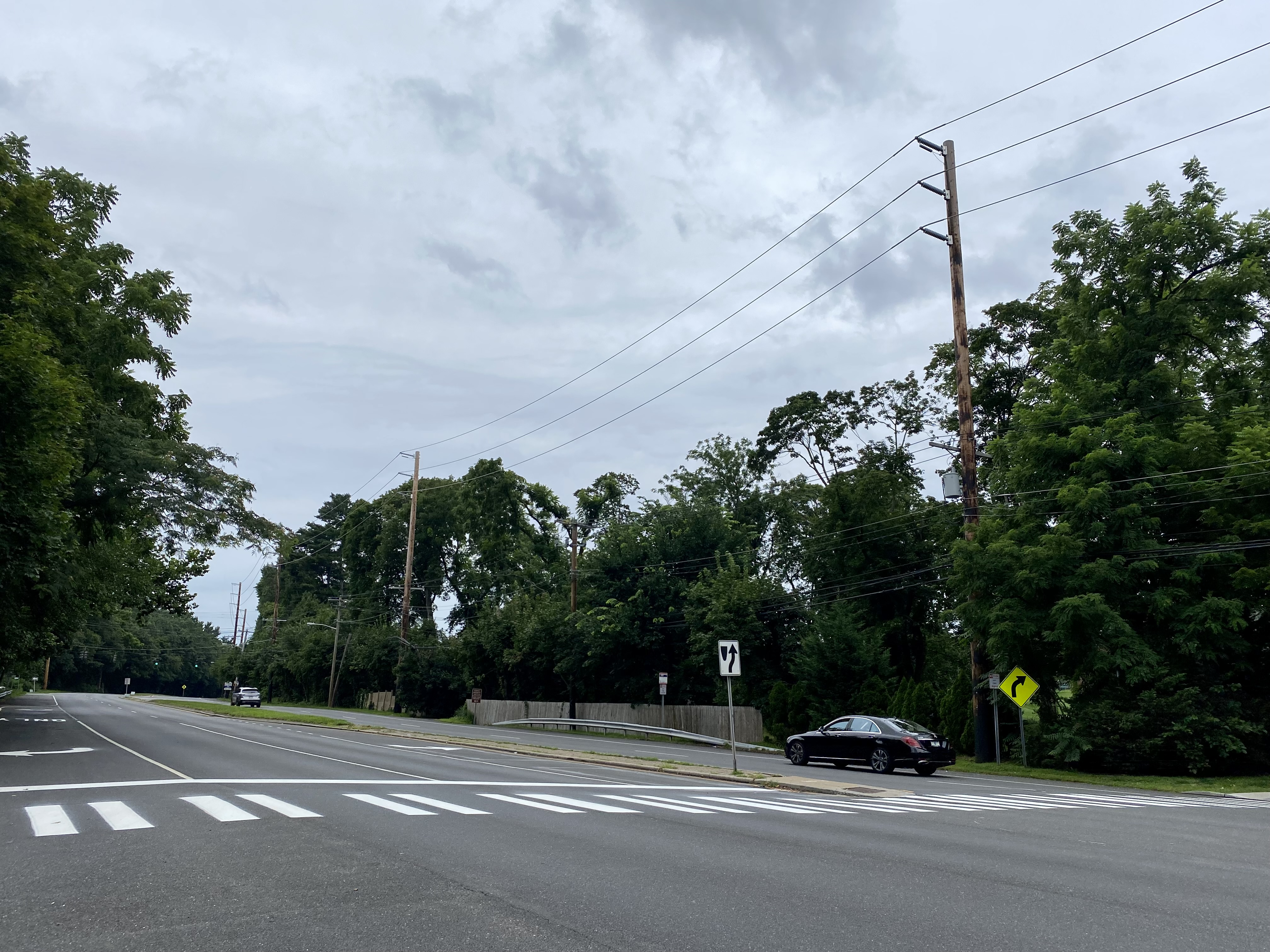
- The transmission line as seen on Port Washington Boulevard in 2021
- Map of the power line

Location
- Country: United States
- State: New York

Ownership information
- Owner: Long Island Power Authority
- Operator: PSEG Long Island

Construction information
- Commissioned: 2014

Technical information
- Type: High-voltage local transmission line
- Total length: 5.6 mi (9.0 km)
- DC voltage: 69 kV (69,000 V)
- No. of poles: 220

The Great Neck to Port Washington Overhead Transmission Line (also known as Circuit 69-485) was a 2014 electrical transmission line project in the Town of North Hempstead in Nassau County, on Long Island, in New York, United States. It saw the construction of a new power transmission line between Great Neck and Port Washington.

== Project overview ==
Following Superstorm Sandy in 2012, Long Island's utility providers and government agencies saw a need to improve Long Island's power grid to make it more efficient and to mitigate service disruptions caused by weather scenarios. In 2014, PSEG Long Island erected this power line to improve the efficiency and resiliency of the power grid in North Hempstead by taking load off of the lines coming from the Glenwood Generating Station in Glenwood Landing.

The Port Washington to Great Neck Overhead Transmission Line serves as a bypass of the 69 kV (69,000-volt) line paralleling the Port Washington Branch of the Long Island Rail Road. It is designed to withstand winds of up to 130 miles per hour (210 km/h).

By June 2014, the project was completed.

== Transmission line route ==
Going from west to east, the transmission line begins at the Great Neck Substation (3A), along the LIRR's Port Washington Branch. It then follows Shoreward Drive from the substation to Windsor Road, which it then follows north to Colonial Road. It turns east onto Colonial Road to East Shore Road. It then travels south along East Shore Road to Bayview Avenue, then follows Bayview Avenue east to Maple Street. It then turns south onto Maple Street to its intersection with Northern Boulevard (New York State Route 25A). It turns east, traveling along the side of Northern Boulevard through Manhasset to its intersection with Port Washington Boulevard (New York State Route 101). It then turns north onto Port Washington Boulevard to Davis Avenue in Port Washington, which it then turns onto, traveling west to South Bayles Avenue. It then turns north onto South Bayles Avenue to South Street. At South Street, it turns west to the Long Island Rail Road tracks, and then turns north, paralleling the tracks and the older transmission line for roughly 2.5 blocks, when it turns west again to cross the tracks, ending at the Port Washington Substation (3H).

The length of the Port Washington to Great Neck Overhead Transmission Line is approximately 5.6 miles (9.0 km), of which roughly 5.0 miles (8.0 km) utilize overhead transmission lines and roughly 0.6 miles (0.97 km) consist of underground lines.

=== Communities along the route ===
- Flower Hill
- Manhasset
- Munsey Park
- Port Washington
- Thomaston

== Specifications ==
- Line length: Approximately 6 miles (9.7 km)
- Line voltage: 69 kV
- West end: Great Neck Substation (3A)
- East end: Port Washington Substation (3H)
- Average pole height: 80–85 feet (24–26 m) (although The New York Times reports an average height of 70 feet (21 m))
- Number of poles: 220

== Controversies ==
The project was met with considerable controversy by residents along the route, citing concerns over the aesthetics and the design of the line. When several locals requested for the remainder of the line to be buried, PSEG stated that they would be willing to do so if residents were willing to fund such a project.

Another controversy involved Penta, a toxic chemical, being used to treat the wooden poles. In September 2014, the Town of North Hempstead addressed the issue, passing a law which requires utility providers to post warnings on the penta-treated utility poles.

== See also ==
- Holbrook Superconductor Project
- Long island Power Authority
