= Baxter Estates, New York =

- Village
- Incorporated Village of Baxter Estates
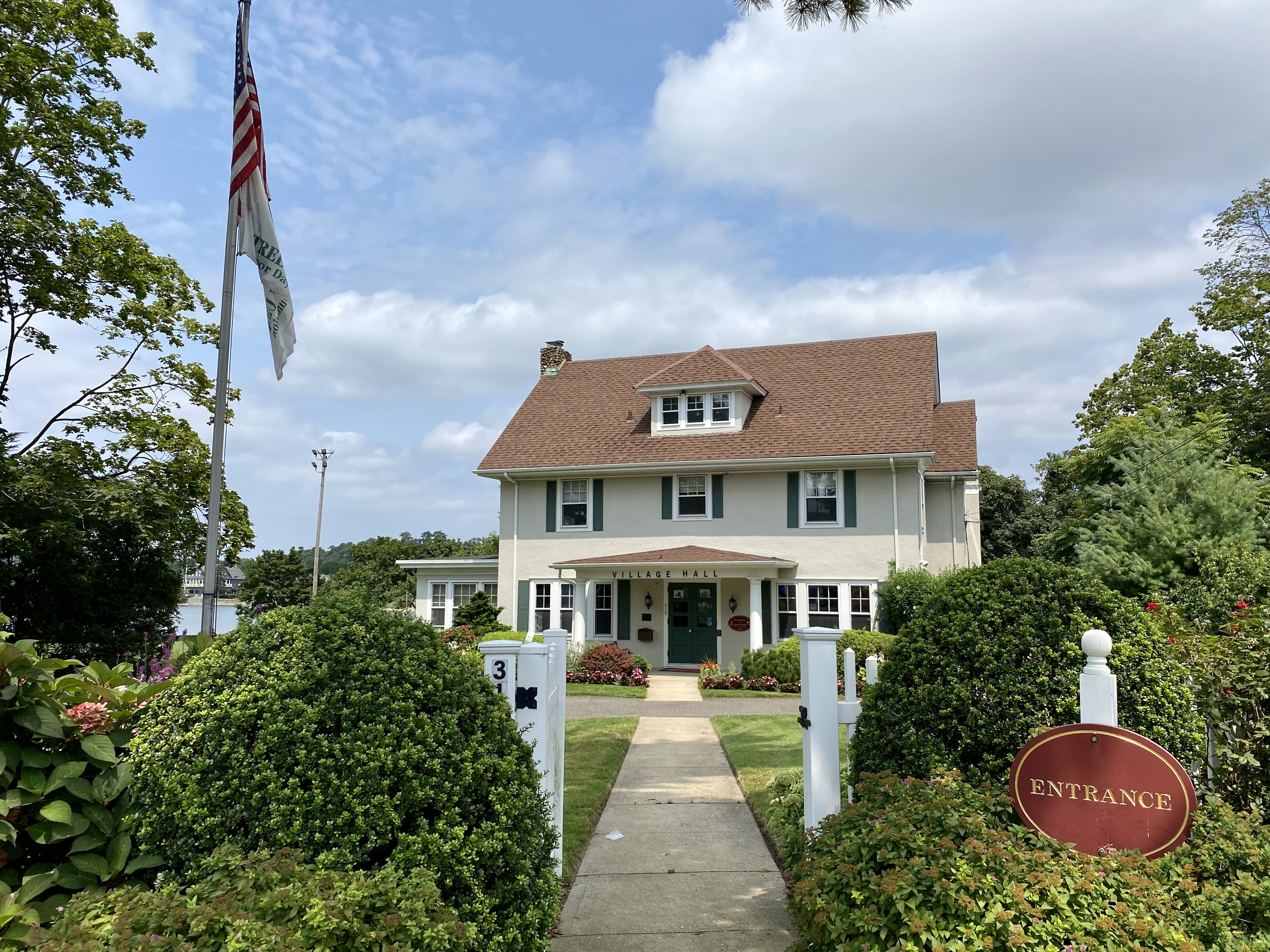
- Baxter Estates Village Hall in 2021
- Nicknames: VBE; VOBE
- Location in Nassau County and the state of New York

- Location on Long Island Location within the state of New York
- Coordinates: 40°50′2″N 73°41′43″W
- Country: United States
- State: New York
- County: Nassau
- Town: North Hempstead
- Incorporated: 1931
- Named for: The Baxter family

Government
  - Mayor: Nora Haagenson
  - Deputy Mayor: Charles Comer

Area
  - Total: 0.18 sq mi (0.47 km^{2})
  - Land: 0.18 sq mi (0.47 km^{2})
  - Water: 0 sq mi (0.00 km^{2})
- Elevation: 39 ft (12 m)

Population (2020)
  - Total: 991
  - Density: 5,430.7/sq mi (2,096.79/km^{2})
- Demonym(s): Baxter Estatesian; Port Washingtonian
- Time zone: UTC-5 (Eastern (EST))
  - Summer (DST): UTC-4 (EDT)
- ZIP code: 11050 (Port Washington)
- Area codes: 516, 363
- FIPS code: 36-04803
- GNIS feature ID: 0943176
- Website: baxterestates.gov

Baxter Estates is a village in Nassau County, on the North Shore of Long Island, in New York, United States. It is considered part of the Greater Port Washington area, which is anchored by Port Washington. The population was 991 at the time of the 2020 census.

The Incorporated Village of Baxter Estates is located on the Cow Neck Peninsula, within the Town of North Hempstead, and is recognized as a Tree City USA.

== History ==
What is now Baxter Estates was originally inhabited by the Matinecock Native Americans, and there is evidence that a Matinecock wigwam village within its territory once existed in the vicinity of Baxter Pond. European colonists eventually settled in the area during the mid-17th century, after purchasing the land on the Cow Neck Peninsula from the Matinecocks in 1644.

In 1673, John Betts and Robert Hutchings built the homestead settlement of "Cow Neck" within present-day Baxter Estates. Located at the corner of Central Drive and Shore Road, overlooking Manhasset Bay, the property – also known as the Baxter Homestead – was purchased by Oliver Baxter around 1741. Hessian troops were quartered on this property – also known as the Baxter Homestead – during the American Revolutionary War.

In 1895, Port Washington's first public library was established in the Baxter Homestead. The Port Washington Public Library would eventually move to what is now the Polish American Museum in unincorporated Port Washington, before moving to its current location along the north side of Main Street; this facility is located within Baxter Estates.

In 1931, Baxter Estates incorporated as a village in order to retain home rule, after Port Washington proposed incorporating as a city and absorbing the territory – about the same time as nearby Flower Hill, which similarly wished to remain independent from the then-proposed City of Port Washington. The residents of Baxter Estates were also concerned about the possibility of Village of Manorhaven annexing their neighborhood, further prompting their decision, after a movement to extend that village's territory further east – including the Port Washington Terrace and Hicksville neighborhoods, and what is now the Village of Port Washington North and the adjacent Morewood Oaks neighborhood – was made; Manorhaven ultimately never absorbed those areas.

In 2010, the Village of Baxter Estates opened the present Baxter Estates Village Hall on Main Street, replacing the former facility – originally built in the 1950s – at the corner of Shore Road and Harbor Road. This new facility, which overlooks Manhasset Bay, is located adjacent to Sunset Park and consists of multiple floors; the village occupies the lower level and leases the space above it to businesses.

On February 5, 2017, the Baxter Homestead was destroyed in a major fire while its owner, Sabrina Wu, was in the process of submitting plans to demolish it. This raised suspicion that the blaze was intentionally set, and an investigation was executed. The cause of the fire has not determined.

In 2024, the village secured a $7.7 million grant from New York state for repairs to the seawall along Shore Road, adjacent to the Baxter Estates Village Beach. The project will additionally see the construction of improved recreational facilities – including a boardwalk over the water, directly linking Bay Walk Park in Port Washington North with Sunset Park in Baxter Estates. The plan – including the boardwalk over Manhasset Bay – were approved by the Town of North Hempstead later that year.

=== Etymology ===
The village is named for the Baxter family – a prominent local family which owned a significant amount of land in the area – including the former homestead at the corner of Central Drive and Shore Road. The Baxters – who were shipbuilders, whalers, and sea captains – retained this property until the 19th century.

== Geography ==
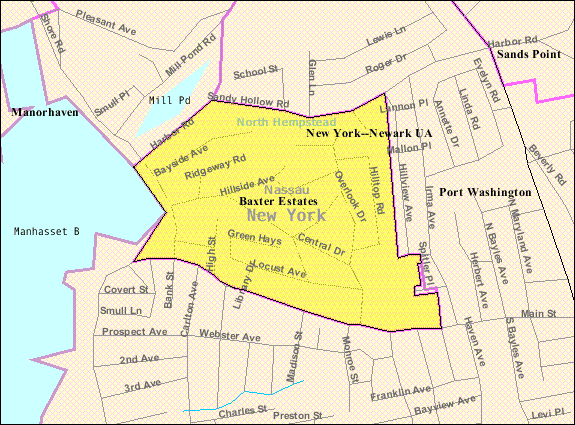
U.S. Census map of Baxter Estates

According to the United States Census Bureau, the village has a total area of 0.2 square miles (0.52 km^{2}), all land.

Additionally, Baxter Estates is located on the western portion of the Cow Neck Peninsula, roughly midway between its southern base and northern tip.

=== Topography ===
Like the rest of Long Island's North Shore, Baxter Estates is situated on a terminal moraine, known as the Harbor Hill Moraine. This moraine was formed by glaciers during the Wisconsin Glacial Episode, and is named for Harbor Hill in Roslyn; Harbor Hill is the highest geographic point in Nassau County.

According to the United States Environmental Protection Agency and the United States Geological Survey, the highest point in Baxter Estates is located on Hilltop Road, at an elevation of 113 feet (34 m), and the lowest point is Manhasset Bay, which is at sea level.

=== Drainage ===
Baxter Estates is located within the Manhasset Bay Watershed, which, in turn, is located within the larger Long Island Sound/Atlantic Ocean Watershed.

=== Climate ===
Baxter Estates has a humid subtropical climate (Cfa), bordering on a hot-summer humid continental climate (Dfa). Average monthly temperatures in the village range from 33.0 °F in January to 75.9 °F in July.

Climate data for Baxter Estates, New York, 1991–2020 normals, extremes 1999–present
Month	Jan	Feb	Mar	Apr	May	Jun	Jul	Aug	Sep	Oct	Nov	Dec	Year
Record high °F (°C)	71 (22)	73 (23)	87 (31)	94 (34)	96 (36)	101 (38)	108 (42)	105 (41)	97 (36)	89 (32)	83 (28)	76 (24)	108 (42)
Mean daily maximum °F (°C)	39.8 (4.3)	41.9 (5.5)	48.7 (9.3)	59.7 (15.4)	69.4 (20.8)	78.6 (25.9)	84.0 (28.9)	82.6 (28.1)	76.4 (24.7)	65.2 (18.4)	54.5 (12.5)	45.0 (7.2)	62.2 (16.7)
Daily mean °F (°C)	33.0 (0.6)	34.5 (1.4)	41.0 (5.0)	51.2 (10.7)	60.8 (16.0)	70.2 (21.2)	75.9 (24.4)	74.8 (23.8)	68.3 (20.2)	57.3 (14.1)	47.1 (8.4)	38.6 (3.7)	54.4 (12.5)
Mean daily minimum °F (°C)	26.1 (−3.3)	27.1 (−2.7)	33.2 (0.7)	42.6 (5.9)	52.2 (11.2)	61.8 (16.6)	67.8 (19.9)	66.9 (19.4)	60.3 (15.7)	49.5 (9.7)	39.8 (4.3)	32.1 (0.1)	46.6 (8.1)
Record low °F (°C)	−4 (−20)	−5 (−21)	5 (−15)	13 (−11)	34 (1)	43 (6)	50 (10)	46 (8)	38 (3)	27 (−3)	18 (−8)	−2 (−19)	−5 (−21)
Average precipitation inches (mm)	3.86 (98)	3.06 (78)	4.30 (109)	4.02 (102)	3.75 (95)	4.31 (109)	4.06 (103)	4.33 (110)	4.22 (107)	4.20 (107)	3.42 (87)	4.31 (109)	47.84 (1,214)
Average snowfall inches (cm)	1.85 (4.7)	7.8 (20)	3.7 (9.4)	0.3 (0.76)	0 (0)	0 (0)	0 (0)	0 (0)	0 (0)	0 (0)	0.2 (0.51)	5.7 (14)	19.55 (49.37)
Average relative humidity (%)	73	75	72	72	75	74	73	71	73	73	71	75	73
Average dew point °F (°C)	22.0 (−5.6)	22.3 (−5.4)	27.3 (−2.6)	37.0 (2.8)	48.2 (9.0)	58.9 (14.9)	64.4 (18.0)	64.2 (17.9)	58.1 (14.5)	47.2 (8.4)	36.5 (2.5)	27.9 (−2.3)	42.8 (6.0)
Mean monthly sunshine hours	177	153	172	167	202	213	237	241	215	190	210	171	2,348
Mean daily daylight hours	9.6	10.7	12.0	13.3	14.5	15.1	14.8	13.7	12.4	11.1	9.9	9.3	12.2
Average ultraviolet index	2	2	2	4	5	6	6	6	5	3	2	2	4
Source 1: NOAA, PRISM, The Weather Channel (temperatures, average dew points, and average precipitation)
Source 2: Weather Spark (all other data)

==== Plant zone ====
According to the United States Department of Agriculture, the village is located within hardiness zone 7b.

== Demographics ==
Historical population
Census	Pop.	Note	%±
1940	760		—
1950	862		13.4%
1960	932		8.1%
1970	1,026		10.1%
1980	911		−11.2%
1990	961		5.5%
2000	1,006		4.7%
2010	999		−0.7%
2020	991		−0.8%
2023 (est.)	1,006	▲	1.5%
U.S. Decennial Census

=== Racial and ethnic composition ===
Baxter Estates village, New York – Racial and ethnic composition Note: the US Census treats Hispanic/Latino as an ethnic category. This table excludes Latinos from the racial categories and assigns them to a separate category. Hispanics/Latinos may be of any race.
Race / Ethnicity (NH = Non-Hispanic)	Pop 2000	Pop 2010	Pop 2020	% 2000	% 2010	% 2020
White alone (NH)	747	743	700	74.25%	74.37%	70.64%
Black or African American alone (NH)	23	12	7	2.29%	1.20%	0.71%
Native American or Alaska Native alone (NH)	1	1	0	0.10%	0.10%	0.00%
Asian alone (NH)	72	60	74	7.16%	6.01%	7.47%
Native Hawaiian or Pacific Islander alone (NH)	0	0	0	0.00%	0.00%	0.00%
Other race alone (NH)	0	1	4	0.00%	0.10%	0.40%
Mixed race or Multiracial (NH)	16	14	33	1.59%	1.40%	3.33%
Hispanic or Latino (any race)	147	168	173	14.61%	16.82%	17.46%
Total	1,006	999	991	100.00%	100.00%	100.00%

=== 2020 census ===
As of the census of 2020, there were 991 people residing in the village. The racial makeup of the village was 71.2% White alone, 0.8% African American, 5.8% Asian, 0.1% Native American, 0.2% from other races, and 3.4% from two or more races. Hispanic or Latino of any race were 18.5% of the population.

=== 2010 census ===
As of the census of 2010, there were 999 people residing in the village. The racial makeup of the village was 81.08% White, 1.30% African American, 6.01% Asian, 3.50% from other races, and 7.61% from two or more races. Hispanic or Latino of any race were 16.82% of the population.

=== Census 2000 ===
As of the census of 2000, there were 1,006 people, 376 households, and 262 families residing in the village. The population density was 5,574.4 inhabitants per square mile (2,152.3/km^{2}). There were 386 housing units at an average density of 2,138.9 per square mile (825.8/km^{2}). The racial makeup of the village was 84.00% White, 2.68% African American, 0.10% Native American, 7.16% Asian, 3.98% from other races, and 2.09% from two or more races. Hispanic or Latino of any race were 14.61% of the population.

There were 376 households, out of which 36.4% had children under the age of 18 living with them, 57.2% were married couples living together, 8.5% had a female householder with no husband present, and 30.1% were non-families. 25.3% of all households were made up of individuals, and 10.9% had someone living alone who was 65 years of age or older. The average household size was 2.68 and the average family size was 3.21.

In the village, the population was spread out, with 24.8% under the age of 18, 6.2% from 18 to 24, 29.0% from 25 to 44, 27.1% from 45 to 64, and 12.9% who were 65 years of age or older. The median age was 39 years. For every 100 females, there were 99.2 males. For every 100 females age 18 and over, there were 95.6 males.

The median income for a household in the village was $84,592, and the median income for a family was $111,074. Males had a median income of $56,250 versus $51,250 for females. The per capita income for the village was $44,718. About 3.0% of families and 4.7% of the population were below the poverty line, including 5.0% of those under age 18 and 6.3% of those age 65 or over.

== Government ==
=== Village government ===
As of July 2025, the Mayor of Baxter Estates is Nora Haagenson, the Deputy Mayor is Charles Comer, and the Village Trustees are Charles Comer, Alice M. Peckelis, Maria Branco and Alexander Price.

=== Representation in higher government ===
On the town level, Baxter Estates is located in the Town of North Hempstead's 6th council district, which as of April 2026 is represented on the North Hempstead Town Council by Mariann Dalimonte (D–Port Washington).

On the county level, Baxter Estates is located in Nassau County's 11th Legislative district, which as of April 2026 is represented in the Nassau County Legislature by Delia DiRiggi-Whitton (D–Glen Cove).

On the state level, Baxter Estates is located within the New York State Assembly's 16th State Assembly district and the New York State Senate's 7th State Senate district, which as of May 2026 are represented by Daniel J. Norber (R–Great Neck) and Jack M. Martins (R–Old Westbury), respectively.

On the federal level, Baxter Estates is located in New York's 3rd congressional district, which as of April 2026 is represented by Thomas R. Suozzi (D–Glen Cove). Like the rest of New York, it is represented in the United States Senate by Charles E. Schumer (D) and Kirsten Gillibrand (D).

=== Politics ===
In the 2024 United States presidential election, the majority of Baxter Estates voters voted for Kamala D. Harris (D). Harris carried the village by roughly 67% of the hamlet's vote, while Donald J. Trump (R) received approximately 32% of the remaining votes.

== Parks and recreation ==
There are multiple parks and recreational facilities located within Baxter Estates. Major parks include:

- Baxter's Pond Park – a Nassau County-owned park at the corner of Shore Road and Central Drive; contains Baxter Pond.
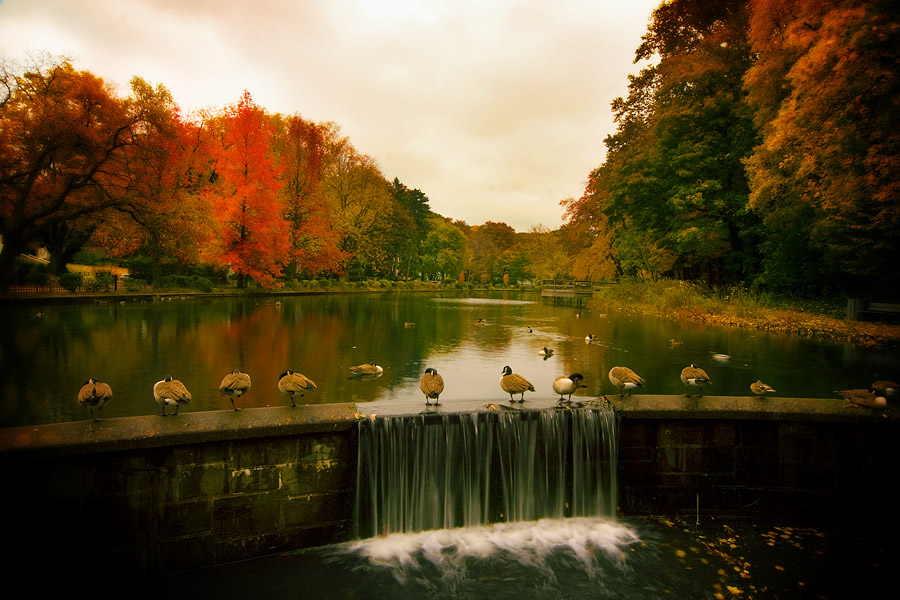
  Baxter Pond – located within Baxter's Pond Park – in 2007
- Baxter Estates Village Beach – a village-owned beach along Manhasset Bay, adjacent to Shore Road.
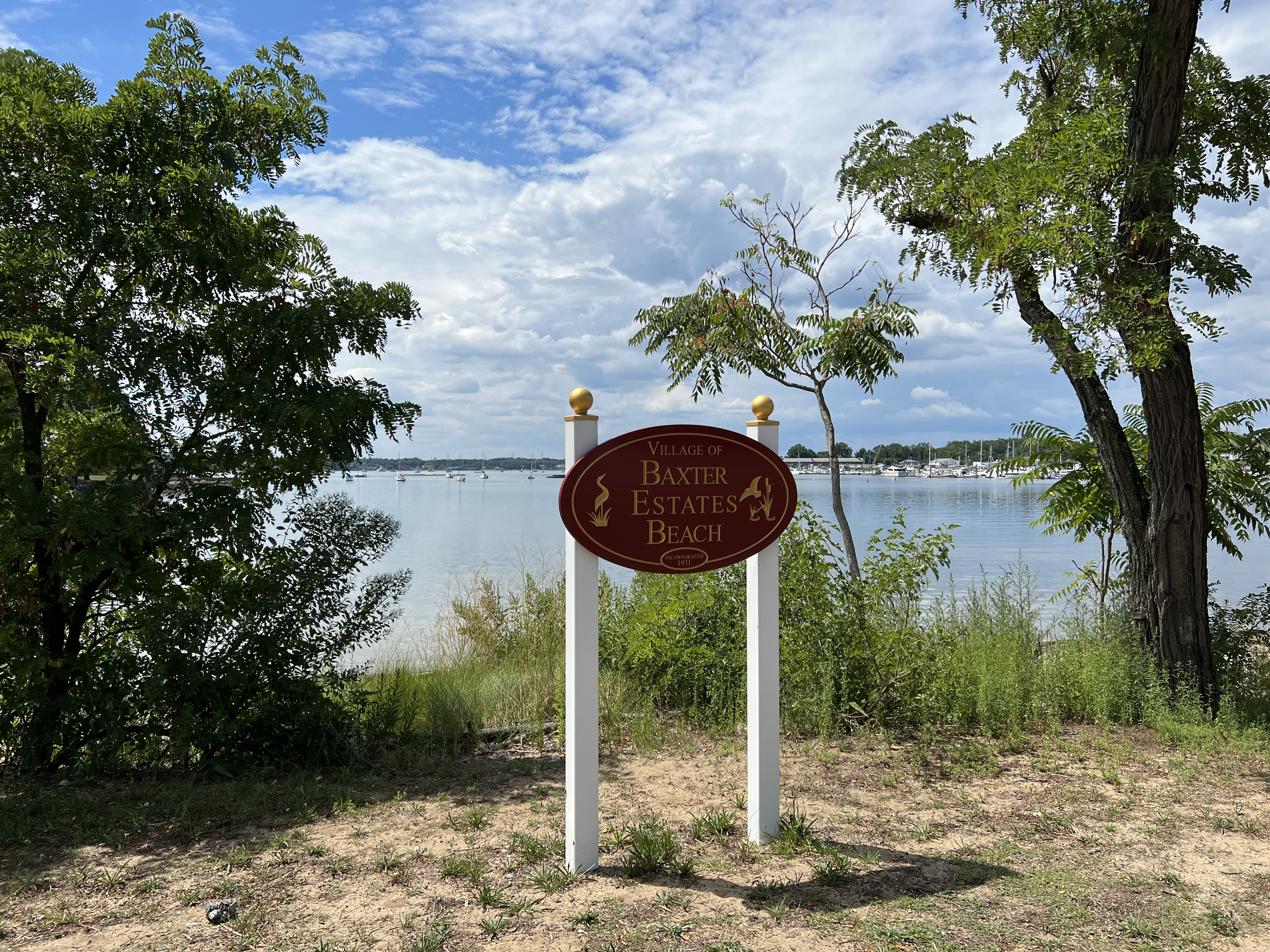
  Baxter Estates Beach in 2022
- Sunset Park – a large park owned by the Port Washington Water Pollution Control District; it is geographically split between Baxter Estates and unincorporated Port Washington and contains several recreational and cultural amenities.

== Education ==
=== School district ===
The Village of Baxter Estates is located entirely within the boundaries of the Port Washington Union Free School District. As such, all children who reside within Baxter Estates and attend public schools go to Port Washington's schools.

=== Library district ===
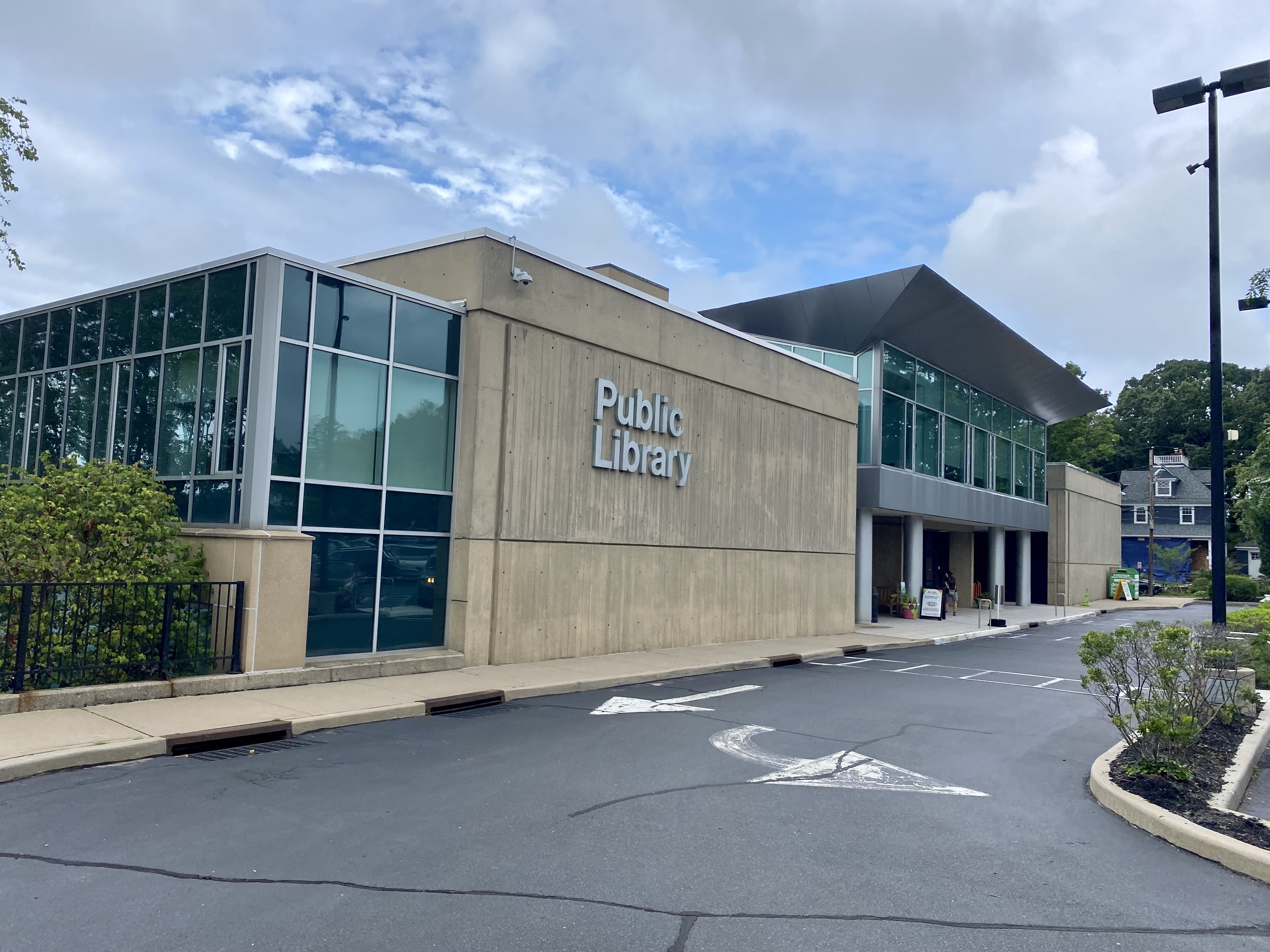
The Port Washington Public Library in August 2021

Baxter Estates is located within the boundaries of the Port Washington Library District, which is served by the Port Washington Public Library.

Additionally, the Port Washington Public Library is located within Baxter Estates.

== Infrastructure ==
=== Transportation ===
==== Road ====
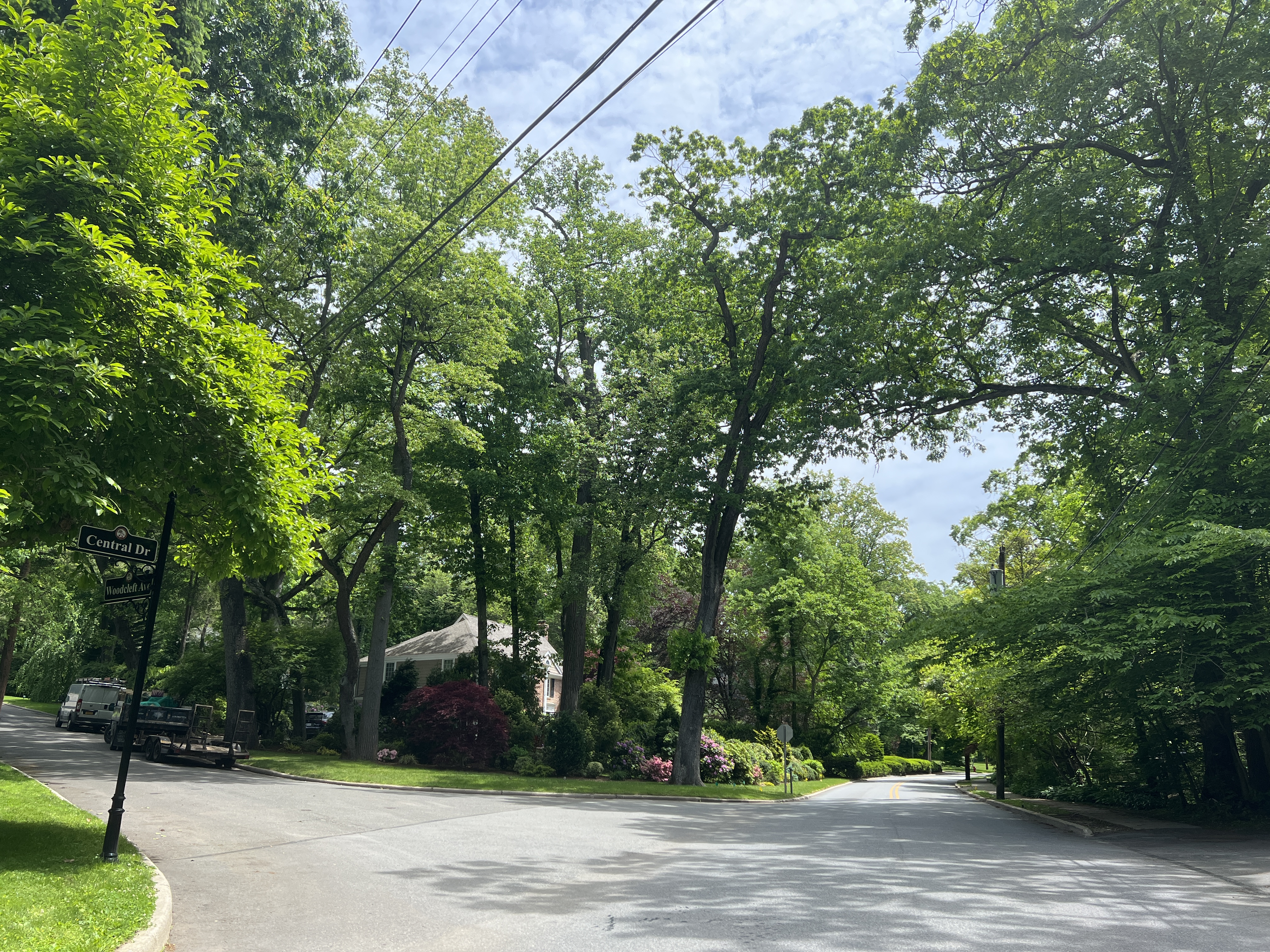
Central Drive in 2022

Major roads in Baxter Estates include Central Drive (CR C36), Main Street, and Shore Road (CR E25).

===== Parking facilities =====
The Port Washington Parking District operates multiple municipal parking fields within Baxter Estates, in addition to all on-street metered parking located within the village.

==== Bus ====
As of May 2026, Baxter Estates is served by two Nassau Inter-County Express bus routes: the n23 and the Port Washington Shuttle.

=== Utilities ===
==== Natural gas ====
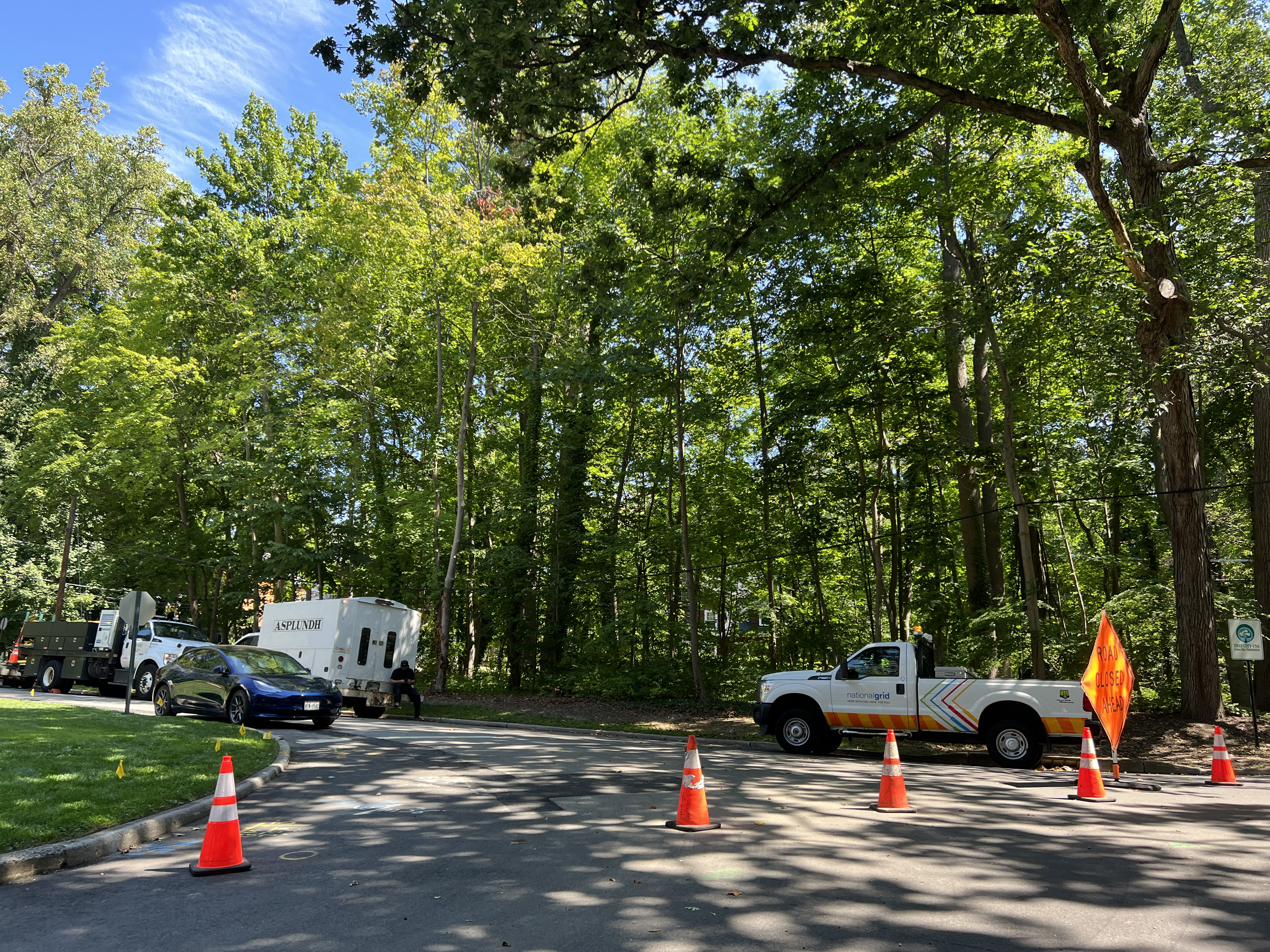
National Grid USA construction work within Baxter Estates in 2022

National Grid USA provides natural gas to homes and businesses that are hooked up to natural gas lines in Baxter Estates.

==== Power ====
PSEG Long Island provides power to all homes and businesses within Baxter Estates, on behalf of the Long Island Power Authority.

==== Sewage ====
Baxter Estates is located within the Port Washington Water Pollution Control District, which operates the sanitary sewer system serving the village.

==== Water ====
Baxter Estates is located within the boundaries of the Port Washington Water District, which provides the entirety of the village with water.

=== Emergency services ===
==== Fire ====
The Village of Baxter Estates, in its entirety, is located within the boundaries of (and is thus served by) the Port Washington Fire District.

==== Police ====
The Village of Baxter Estates is served by the Port Washington Police District.

== Landmarks ==
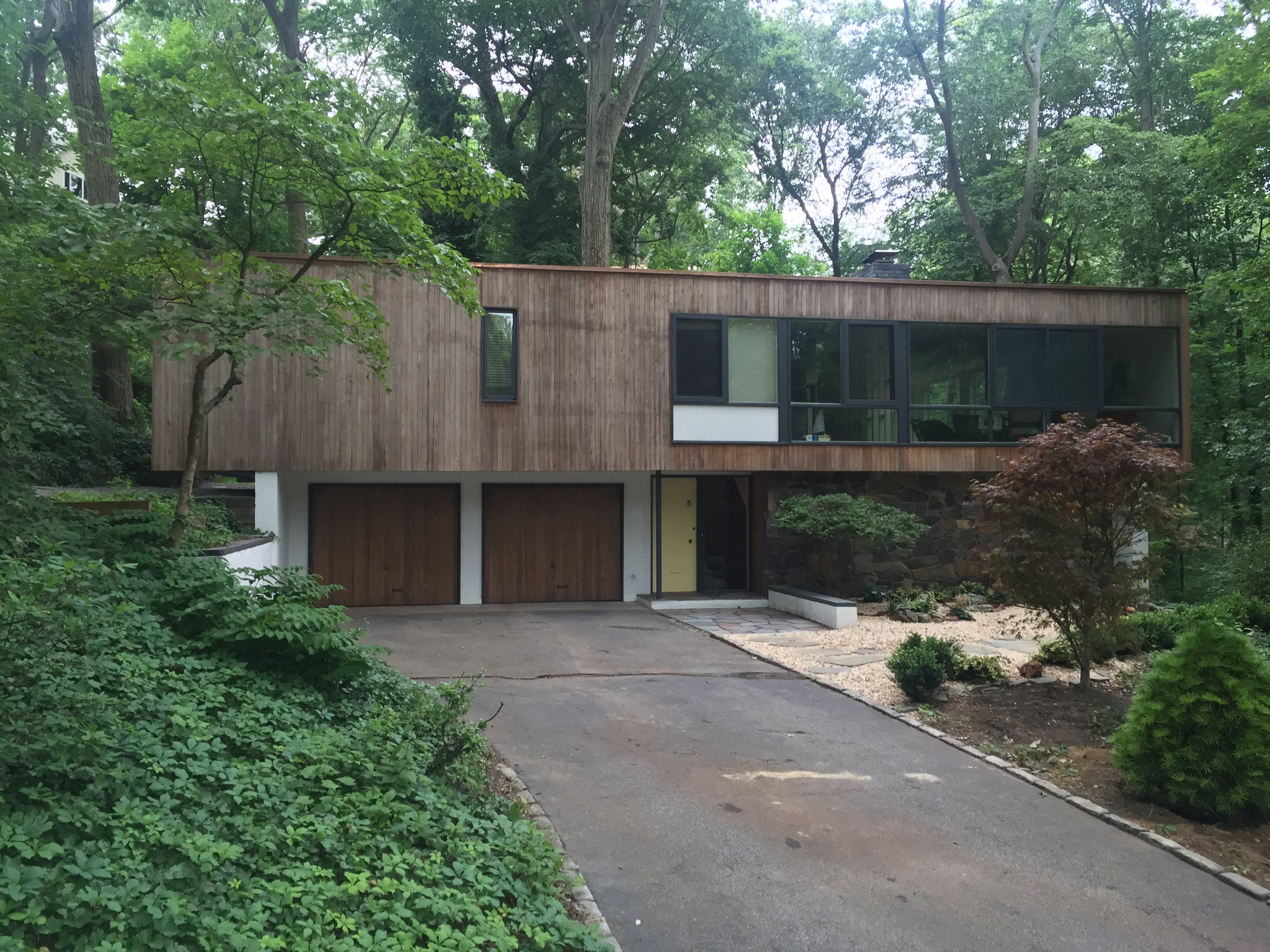
The William Landsberg House in 2016

- The William Landsberg House is located at 5 Tianderah Road. It is listed on the National Register of Historic Places.
- The Baxter Homestead stood at 15 Shore Road until being destroyed in a 2017 fire; erected in 1673 and designated a Village of Baxter Estates Historical Landmark in 2005.

== Notable people ==
- Henry Titus Aspinwall – Architect and Village Trustee; lived on North Washington Street.
- Tallulah Bankhead – Actress; lived in the historic Baxter House.
- William Landsberg – Architect; designed his Baxter Estates home.
- Addison Mizner – Architect especially well-known for his many works and cultural influence in South Florida; lived in the historic Baxter Home.
- George Pickow – Photographer; Jean Ritchie's husband.
- Susan Quittmeyer – Opera singer; grew up on Ridgeway Road.
- Jean Ritchie – Folk singer; lived on Locust Avenue.

== See also ==
- List of Tree Cities USA
- List of municipalities in New York
