= Baxter Homestead =

Historic site in Baxter Estates, New York

- Interactive map of Baxter Homestead
- Coordinates: 40°50′2.2″N 73°41′55.8″W
- Location: 15 Shore Road, Port Washington, NY 11050; Village of Baxter Estates

History
- Built: 1673
- Demolished: 2017

The Baxter Homestead – also known as the Baxter Home and Baxter House – was a historic home located at the corner of Central Drive and Shore Road within the Village of Baxter Estates, in Nassau County, New York, United States.

== History ==
The Baxter Homestead was built in 1673, John Betts and Robert Hutchings built the homestead settlement of "Cow Neck" within present-day Baxter Estates – itself on the Cow Neck Peninsula. Located at the corner of Central Drive and Shore Road, overlooking Manhasset Bay, the property was purchased by Oliver Baxter around 1741. Maps from that time indicate that an entire wigwam village, belonging to the Matinecock Native Americans, may have been located on the land; this was confirmed around the early 1940s while crews were rehabilitating Baxter Pond, directly across Central Drive. During the American Revolutionary War, Hessian troops were quartered in the Baxter House.

The Baxters retained the property until the 19th century. In 1895, the Port Washington Public Library used the parlor of the house, which, in turn, served as the first public library in Port Washington. The property was subsequently the residence of prominent architect Addison Mizner.

The residence was designated as a Village of Baxter Estates Historical Landmark in 2005.

=== Fire and demolition ===
In the 2010s, the final owner of the Baxter Homestead – Queens resident Sabrina Wu – proposed demolishing the landmarked home; Wu purchased the property in 2003. The plans were met with stiff opposition from locals and public officials in Baxter Estates and throughout the rest of the Port Washington area.

On February 5, 2017, a massive fire broke out in the landmarked house while Wu was in the process of submitting the plans; the structure sustained catastrophic damage and was deemed a total loss. The cause of the fire was not determined.

Following the fire, the Baxter Homestead was demolished; the demolition work was completed on October 9, 2017.

=== Replacement ===
After the ruins of the Baxter Homestead were demolished, Wu submitted plans to construct a new house on her property. Due to the property's landmark status, the Village of Baxter Estates Landmarks Preservation Commission was involved in the new home's design. The replacement home, which will incorporates elements of the original structure, is being designed by architect and preservationist Frank Genese.

== Notable residents ==
- Tallulah Bankhead – actress.
- Addison Mizner – architect especially well known for his many works and cultural influence in South Florida.

== See also ==
- Sands-Willets Homestead
- Thomas Dodge Homestead
- William Landsberg House
