= New York State Route 101 =

Highway on Long Island, New York

New York State Route 101
- Port Washington Boulevard; Sergeant James J. Regan Memorial Boulevard
- Map of northern Nassau County with NY 101 highlighted in red

Route information
- Maintained by NYSDOT
- Length: 3.58 mi (5.76 km)
- Existed: c. 1931–present

Major junctions
- South end: NY 25A in Flower Hill
- North end: Astor Lane in Sands Point

Location
- Country: United States
- State: New York
- Counties: Nassau

Highway system
- New York Highways; Interstate; US; State; Reference; Parkways
← NY 100C	→ NY 102

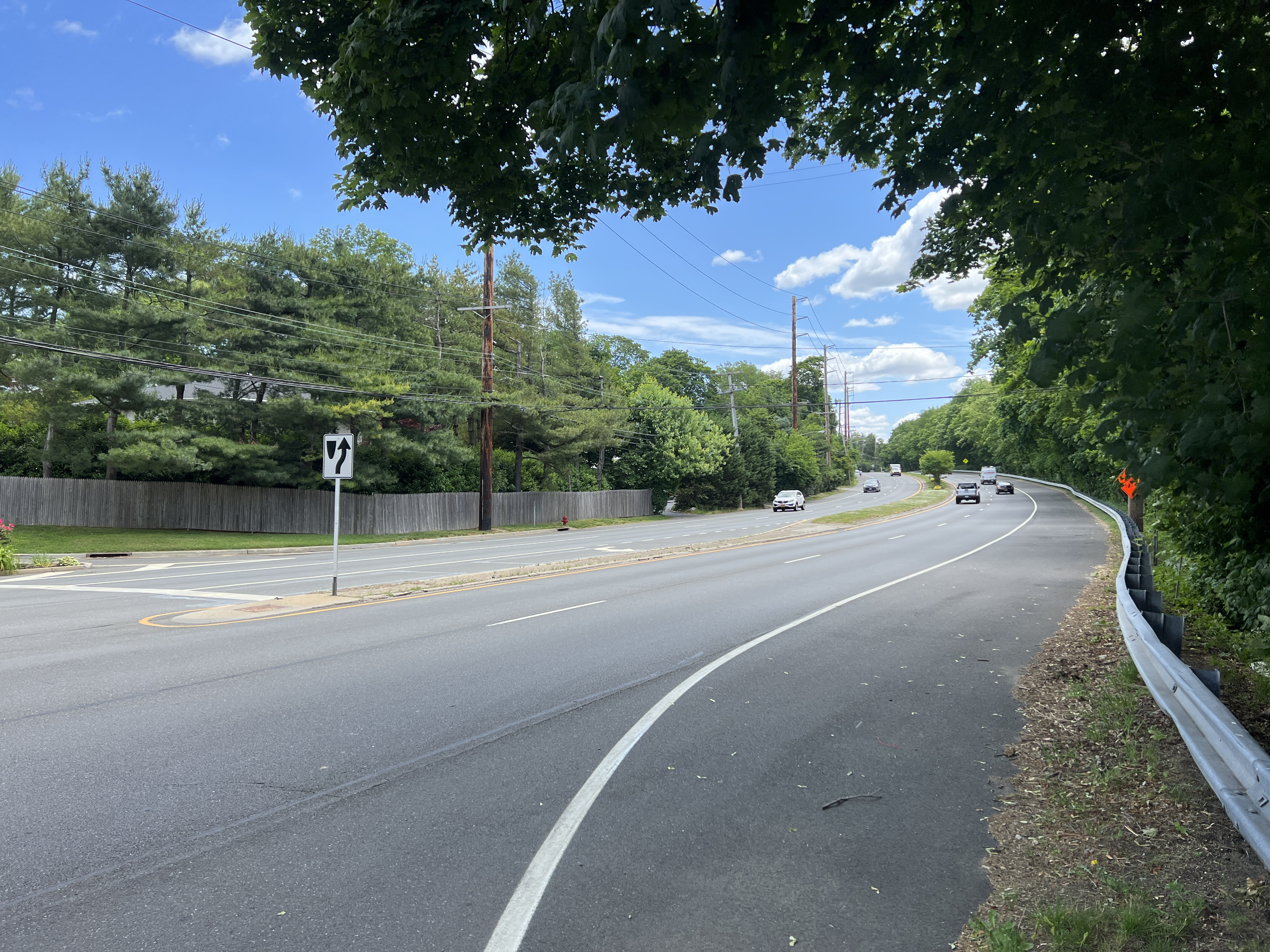
NY 101, as seen in June 2023, looking south from its intersection with Country Club Drive and Bonnie Heights Road in Flower Hill.

New York State Route 101 (NY 101) is a 3.58-mile (5.76 km) long state highway in northwestern Nassau County, New York, in the United States. It runs north–south as Port Washington Boulevard from NY 25A in Flower Hill, west of Roslyn and east of Manhasset, to Astor Lane in Sands Point. It becomes County Route 101 (CR 101) south along Searingtown Road to Shelter Rock Road (CR 8) and becomes Middle Neck Road (CR D55) north of Astor Lane, continuing north and west to a dead end at the Long Island Sound as the unsigned County Route D55 (CR D55).

NY 101 was assigned c. 1931 while the county route continuations were assigned in 1959. CR 101 was initially signed; however, signage for the route was removed in 1973. In the 1960s, a proposal was made to construct an expressway, known as the Western Nassau Expressway. This expressway would have extended from NY 27 to NY 101 and utilized the NY 101 corridor north of NY 25A. The proposal was shelved in the 1970s.

== Route description ==
=== South of NY 25A (CR 101) ===
CR 101 begins at an intersection with Shelter Rock Road (CR 8) and Herricks Road near Herricks High School. The route heads eastward as Searingtown Road, passing to the south of the high school and to the north of a small pond. One block east of Herricks Road, CR 101 intersects with Old Searingtown Road, a former alignment of the current CR 101 alignment. At this point, the highway curves to the northeast and passes through a small area of trees nestled amongst a large, residential area bordering Williston Park. Old Searingtown Road rejoins CR 101 at the northern edge of the forested area.

The route continues north, serving as the boundary between Searingtown and Albertson as it proceeds past side streets lined by homes. At I.U. Willets Road, CR 101 serves the Henry Viscardi School and enters Searingtown. Just inside of the community, CR 101 intersects Hilldale Drive and Dogwood Road, two local streets connecting to Herricks Middle School. The route continues on through Searingtown into the village of North Hills, where the homes give way to trees as it turns to the northeast and passes under the Northern State Parkway. A short distance after the Northern Parkway overpass, CR 101 meets the Long Island Expressway (Interstate 495) by way of Nassau Boulevard—the southern service road—and North Service Road.

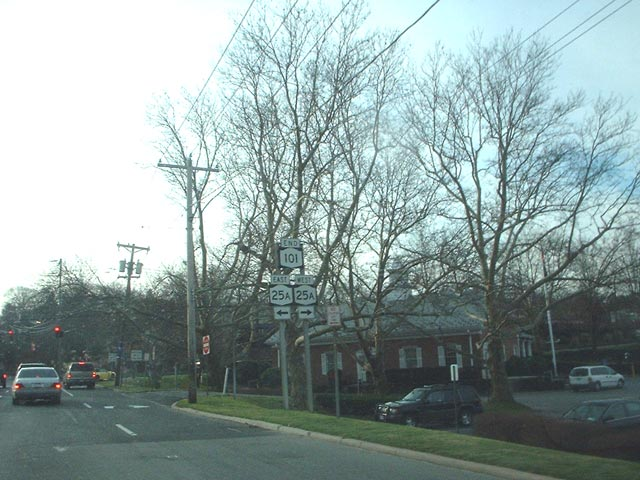
NY 101 southbound at NY 25A in between the Villages of Flower Hill (at left) and Munsey Park (at right).

North of the Long Island Expressway, CR 101 passes by Christopher Morley Park to the east and residential neighborhoods to the west. Past the park, CR 101 enters an area with more residential development as it begins to run along the western boundary of Roslyn Estates and the eastern edge of Manhasset. The homes give way to commercial developments as the highway approaches Flower Hill and NY 25A (Northern Boulevard). Searingtown Road becomes Port Washington Boulevard and CR 101 becomes NY 101 upon intersecting NY 25A.

Historically, Searingtown Road was known as Searington–Flower Hill Road.

=== NY 101 ===
NY 101 continues north from NY 25A as a four-lane, undivided highway, passing homes, businesses, and small patches of trees situated near the junction with NY 25A. At an intersection with Park Avenue North, NY 101 becomes a divided highway with two lanes in each direction. The highway continues north through Flower Hill to St. Francis Hospital, where it curves to the northwest to serve the center of Flower Hill. Here, NY 101 passes east of the Flower Hill Village Park and west of the North Hempstead Country Club, before curving back to the north and entering Port Washington.

In Port Washington, NY 101 passes Nassau Knolls Cemetery and narrows to become a four-lane undivided highway as it enters the center of the hamlet. It proceeds north–south through downtown, passing several blocks of commercial buildings and Paul D. Schreiber Senior High School ahead of a junction with Main Street. North of this point, the surroundings of NY 101 become more residential as the route narrows to two lanes and passes into the village of Sands Point. NY 101 ends shortly afterward at an intersection with Astor Lane, at which point Port Washington Boulevard is continued by Middle Neck Road and designated as CR 101.

=== North of Astor Lane (CR D55) ===
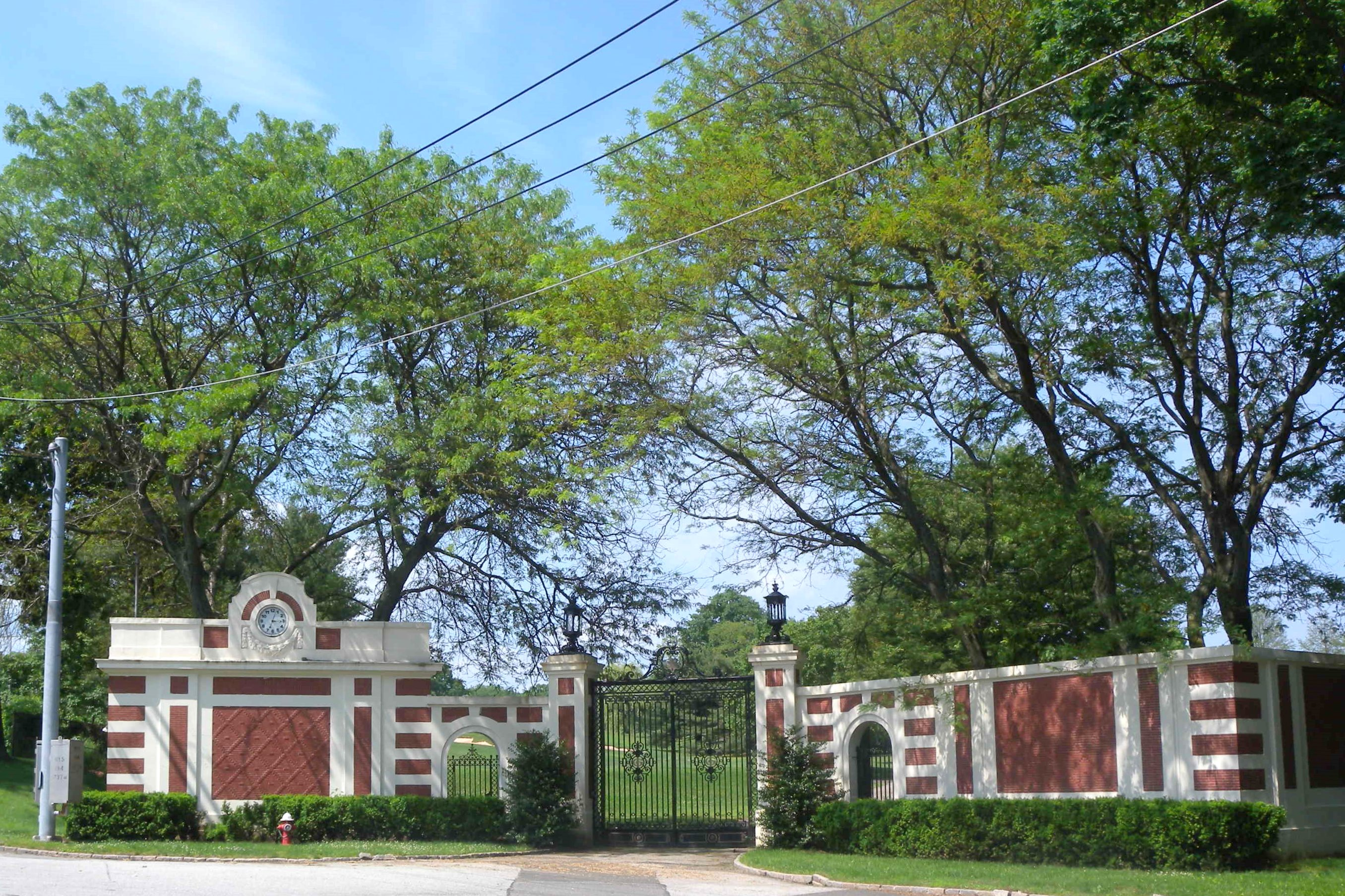
Country club gate at Astor Lane.

North of Astor Lane, the road becomes Middle Neck Road (CR D55) and heads northward, passing local residences and local commercial buildings to the west and the Village Club of Sands Point to the east. North of the club, the highway curves to the northwest and becomes surrounded by several blocks of residential homes to the southwest and patches of trees to the northeast as it heads deeper into the village.

From this point west to the highway's end on Long Island Sound, CR D55 follows a mostly east–west alignment through Sands Point. Along this last stretch, the route passes to the south of the Sands Point Preserve and north past Sands Point Golf Club as the surroundings around the route become increasingly forested and undeveloped. At Tibbits Lane, the route turns to the northwest and continues to the road's end at a dead end on the southern shore of Long Island Sound.

== History ==
In the 1930 renumbering of state highways in New York, several of the routes assigned during the 1920s were renumbered or modified. At the same time, hundreds of state-maintained highways that did not yet have a route number were assigned one. One of these highways was Port Washington Boulevard, a roadway connecting NY 25A (Northern Boulevard) in Flower Hill to Astor Lane in Sands Point, which was designated as NY 101 by the following year. Shortly after being designated as NY 101, the road was widened to 30 feet (9.1 m).

=== 1950s improvement project ===
In the late 1950s, the New York State Department of Public Works modernized NY 101 in a $1,690,000 (1958 USD) improvement project. This project, which began in early 1957, saw the widening of Port Washington Boulevard – most notably the 1.5-mile (2.4 km) part running through Flower Hill, and was carried out by a private firm contracted by the Department of Public Works. Many people residing in Flower Hill and other surrounding communities were concerned by these improvements, in part due to the number of trees that were removed to accommodate the widened roadway, and the fact that the state did not immediately commit to replanting greenery and restoring the landscape. The state also did not immediately compensate the Village of Flower Hill for the property acquired through eminent domain, and the grades of several intersections in Flower Hill being engineered to have unusually steep angles, with the intersecting, residential roads being significantly lower than the improved Port Washington Boulevard. Furthermore, the roadway was also cited by local residents and officials as being engineered to carry traffic at speeds significantly higher than Flower Hill's then-standard, 30-mph (48 km/h) speed limit.

These issues prompted Harold S. Shouse, the Mayor of Flower Hill, to cite the road as being "poorly engineered", and that the "road has been engineered for 70-mph and the present speed limit is 30-mph."

The state ultimately pledged to restore the landscaping and announced that they would adjust the grade of the intersections if prompted to do so by Flower Hill's officials.

=== CR 101 designated (1959) ===
In 1959, the Nassau County Department of Public Works created a numbered highway system as part of their "Master Plan" for the county highway system. This plan marked CR 101 along its current alignment.

=== Cancelled Western Nassau Expressway ===
In 1963, roughly a decade after the cancellation of the Freeport–Roslyn Expressway, the New York State Department of Public Works proposed a new expressway, known as the Western Nassau Expressway. This expressway would have extended from Sunrise Highway (NY 27) in Valley Stream north to an intersection with Middle Neck Road (then-CR 101) in Sands Point. Part of the route would use modern NY 101 and the right-of-way of an abandoned Long Island Rail Road line. In 1971, several proposed crossings of the Long Island Sound were studied. One crossing, a bridge connecting Sands Point to New Rochelle in Westchester County, may have become a northward extension of the highway if it was constructed. By 1971, though, hopes had begun to fade on the highway's prospects of becoming reality. Even if construction had begun in that year, the highway would not be open to traffic until 1975. The project was eventually shelved.

=== Modern history (2005–present) ===
Since 2005, the traffic counts contained within the annual New York State Department of Transportation (NYSDOT) Traffic Data Report have indicated that the northern terminus of NY 101 is at an intersection with Beacon Hill Road. However, other documents produced by NYSDOT, such as their official description of routes in New York, give the highway's northern terminus as Astors [sic] Lane.

In 2014, as part of a project to improve electricity transmission in the area, PSEG Long Island erected a new power line between Great Neck and Port Washington. The routing follows Port Washington Boulevard through the area, and was controversial due to the height of the poles.

In November 2017, the portion of NY 101 between Northern Boulevard and Crabapple Road was dedicated and renamed to Sergeant James J. Regan Memorial Boulevard, after the late U.S. Army Ranger Sergeant James J. Regan, in efforts made by New York State Senator Elaine Phillips. Regan, a Purple Heart recipient from Manhasset, was killed on active duty in Northern Iraq on February 9, 2007, when the vehicle that he was in was targeted by an IED.

Starting in 2019, after several years of complaints from local and state officials, and from residents of communities along the route, NYSDOT repaved the entirety of Port Washington Boulevard from Northern Boulevard to Harbor Road. This project was completed in 2020.

== Major intersections ==
The entire route is in Nassau County.

Location	mi	km	Destinations	Notes
Herricks–Searingtown line	0.00	0.00	Shelter Rock Road / Herricks Road (CR 8) – Manhasset	
North Hills	1.50	2.41	I-495 – New York, Riverhead	Exit 36 on I-495
Manhasset–Roslyn Estates– Munsey Park–Flower Hill quadripoint	4.70 0.00	7.56 0.00	NY 25A (Northern Boulevard)	Route transition between CR 101 and NY 101; southern terminus of NY 101
Flower Hill	0.53	0.85	Middle Neck Road and St. Francis Hospital entrance	Access to St. Francis Hospital
Flower Hill	1.11	1.79	Bonnie Heights Road and Country Club Drive	
Flower Hill	1.28	2.06	Stonytown Road	
Port Washington	1.9	3.1	Salem Lane	
Port Washington	2.72	4.38	Beacon Hill Road (CR 15) and Main Street	
Sands Point	3.58 0.00	5.76 0.00	Harbor Road (CR D07) and Astor Lane	Route transition between NY 101 and CR D55; northern terminus of NY 101
Sands Point	2.80	4.51	Lighthouse Road	Northern terminus of CR D55; dead end at Long Island Sound shore
1.000 mi = 1.609 km; 1.000 km = 0.621 mi: Route transition

== Middle Neck Road (Flower Hill, New York) ==
Middle Neck Road
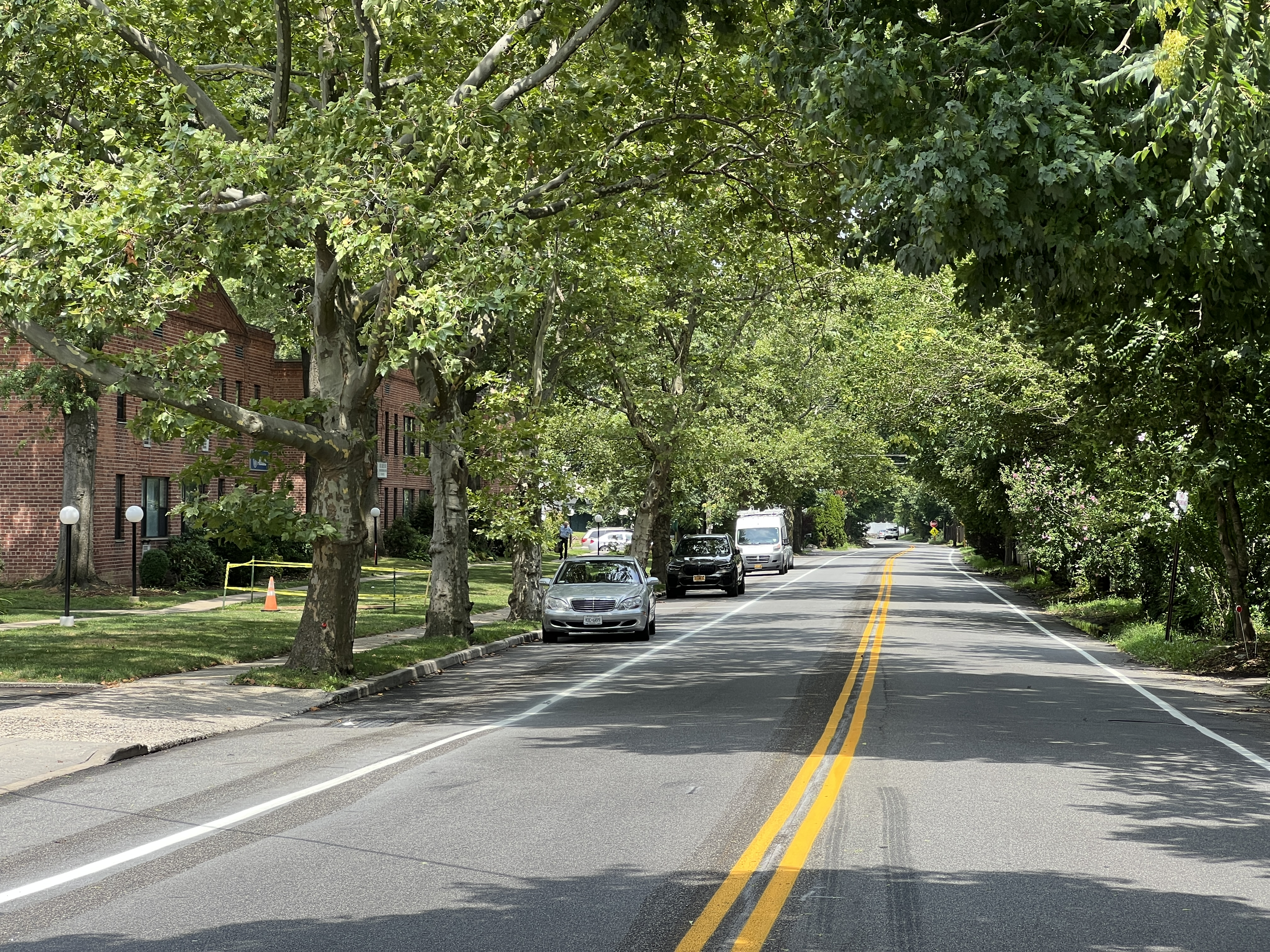
- Middle Neck Road in Flower Hill in 2022.
- Type: Major Collector
- Owner: Village of Flower Hill
- Maintained by: Flower Hill Department of Public Works
- Length: 0.53 mi (0.85 km)
- Restrictions: No commercial vehicles over 2 tons
- South end: Northern Boulevard (NY 25A)
- North end: Port Washington Boulevard (NY 101)

Middle Neck Road is a major, 0.53-mile (0.9 km) road in the Incorporated Village of Flower Hill, New York. It connects NY 25A to its south and NY 101 to its north.

This portion of Middle Neck Road was formerly designated as CR 101A – and later as the southern segment of CR D55, in tandem with the northern, disconnected segment of Middle Neck Road in the Incorporated Village of Sands Point.

When numbered as CR 101A, the route was a spur of CR 101 in name only, as it never connected to CR 101.

The road is classified as a major collector roadway by the New York State Department of Transportation and is eligible for federal aid.

=== Route description ===
Middle Neck Road begins at an intersection with Northern Boulevard (NY 25A) and The Locusts. From this intersection, Middle Neck Road continues towards the north along a mostly straight right-of-way, eventually reaching its southern intersection with Greenway.

From its southern intersection with Greenway, the road continues towards the north for a short distance before bending slightly to the northwest, continuing in that general direction and soon intersecting Woodland Road, thence reaching another intersection with Greenway, and thence with Cherrywood Lane. Middle Neck Road then continues in the same direction, and it soon reaches its northern terminus at Port Washington Boulevard (NY 101).

=== History ===
In the early 20th century, the Port Washington Line of the New York & North Shore Traction Company ran along Middle Neck Road. The system's Roslyn Trolley Yard was located at the southern end of the road. The trolley operated between the 1900s and 1920s.

In 2022, the Incorporated Village of Flower Hill took ownership of Middle Neck Road in a deal with Nassau County; the village acquired the road for $1.

=== Major intersections ===
The entire route is in Nassau County.

Location	mi	km	Destinations	Notes
Flower Hill–Roslyn Estates line	0.00	0.00	NY 25A (Northern Boulevard) / The Locusts	Southern terminus; roadway continues south as The Locusts, through Roslyn Estates
Flower Hill	0.27	0.43	Greenway	One-way westbound
Flower Hill	0.53	0.85	NY 101 (Port Washington Boulevard)	Northern terminus; access to St. Francis Hospital
1.000 mi = 1.609 km; 1.000 km = 0.621 mi: Incomplete access

== See also ==
- List of county routes in Nassau County, New York
- List of state routes in New York
