= Sands Point =

Sands Point may refer to:

- Sands Point, New Jersey
- Sands Point, New York
  - Sands Point Country Day School
  - Sands Point Light
  - Sands Point Seaplane Base
- Sands Point Stakes
