= Sands Family Cemetery =

Historic cemetery in New York, United States

- U.S. National Register of Historic Places
- Location within New York Location within the United States
- Location: Off Sands Point Rd. just S of jct. with Middle Neck Rd., Sands Point, New York
- Coordinates: 40°51′29″N 73°43′24″W
- Area: less than one acre
- Built: ca. 1704
- Architect: Multiple
- NRHP reference No.: 92000092
- Added to NRHP: March 12, 1992

The Sands Family Cemetery is a historic cemetery located in the Incorporated Village of Sands Point in Nassau County, New York, United States.

== Description ==
The cemetery was established around 1704 and includes burials through 1867. It includes 12 rows of 86 extant headstones. Records indicate the cemetery contains 112 members of the family, relatives, and friends. It includes a number of notable examples of funerary art.

It was added to the National Register of Historic Places in 1992.

== See also ==
- Flower Hill Cemetery (Flower Hill, New York)
- Monfort Cemetery
