= Village Club of Sands Point =

Park and golf club in Sands Point, New York, United States

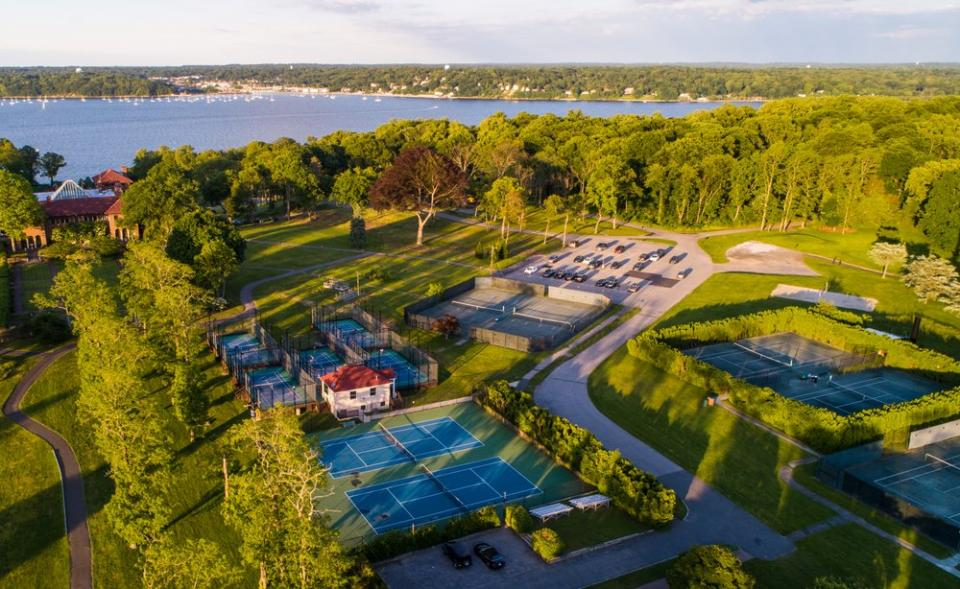
- The Village Club of Sands Point in 2024
- Interactive map of Village Club of Sands Point
- Type: Active
- Location: Thayer Lane, Sands Point, New York, United States
- Coordinates: 40.849°N 73.682°W
- Area: 208 acres (84 ha)
- Opened: 1995
- Owner: Village of Sands Point
- Operator: Village of Sands Point
- Website: villageclub.org

The Village Club of Sands Point is a 208-acre (84 ha) municipal park and golf club located within the Incorporated Village of Sands Point, in Nassau County, New York, United States.

The club is owned and operated by the Village of Sands Point, and is open to village residents and to non-residents who are members.

== Description ==
The Village Club of Sands Point is located on Thayer Road on the east side of Sands Point and the Cow Neck Peninsula, bordered to the west by Middle Neck Road and to the east by Hempstead Harbor.

The Village Club includes an 18-hole golf course, tennis and pickleball courts, a swimming pool, a restaurant and clubhouse, and a beach – and contains multiple structures preserved from the property's original use as an estate for – and owned by – members of the Guggenheim family. The property consists of a total area of roughly 208 acres (84 ha).

The club is open to village residents and to non-residents who are members.

== History ==
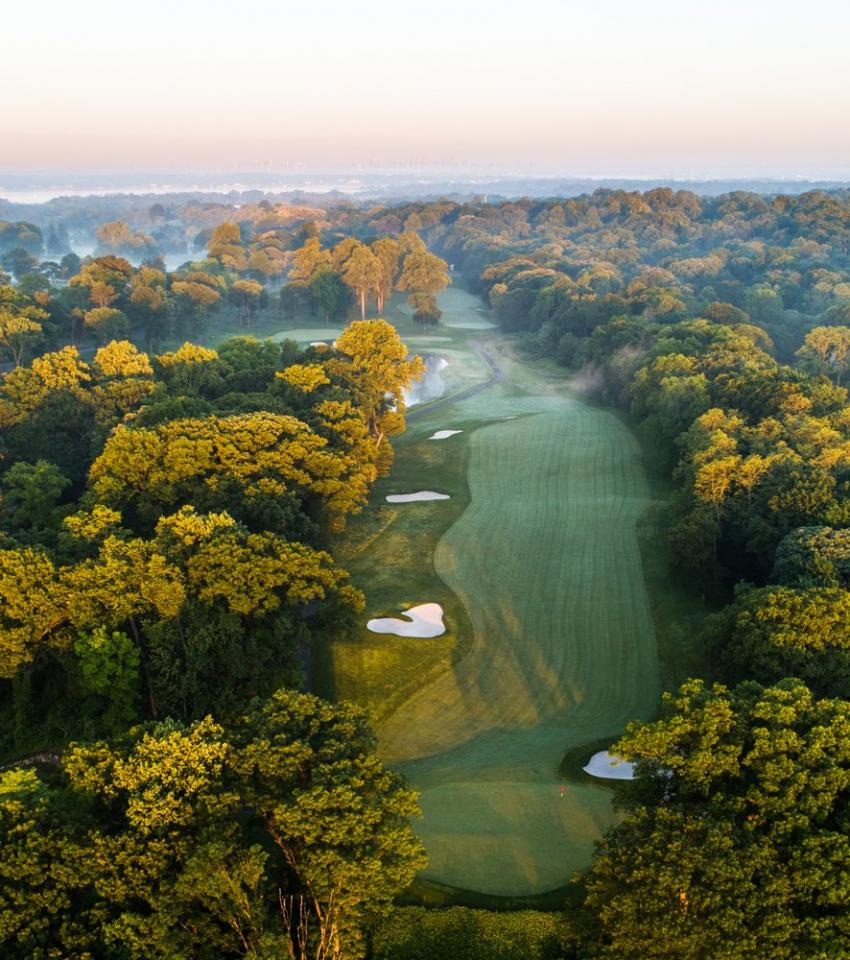
The Village Club's golf course in 2024

The land on which the Village Club of Sands Point sits was first developed in 1916 as the Gold Coast estate of Isaac Guggenheim. Following the 1949 death of Solomon R. Guggenheim – the last member of the Guggenheim brothers to reside on the Sands Point estate, the IBM Corporation purchased the land for use as a corporate retreat. It subsequently developed the IBM Country Club on 208 acres (84 ha) of the property in the 1950s. Robert Trent Jones, Sr. designed the golf course, which then consisted of nine holes. The former Guggenheim mansion, along with multiple other buildings and gardens from the original estate, were preserved and remain standing, in use for the club.

By the early 1990s, IBM planned to sell the property. It was soon announced that a developer planned to erect 135 homes on the country club's property, which was met with opposition from the Sands Point community and its government.

In 1994, the Village of Sands Point purchased the property from the IBM Corporation for $12.7 million, aiming to preserve the property from development and to create a municipal park and golf club on the land. The purchase was funded through bonds and a 34% increase in real estate taxes for a 20-year period. The village also announced about this time, that it would expand the facilities at the club.

A controversy over the expansion plans emerged in the second half of the 1990s, when a group of village residents against Sands Point continuing to fund the project unsuccessfully sued the village multiple times, concerned over bonds and financing; the disagreements over whether to move forward with the expansion additionally spurred a contest in the village's 1996 elections. Ultimately, the village's residents voted favorably in the election, the New York Supreme Court ruled in the village's favor and dismissed all of the lawsuits, and the expansion continued – including plans to expand the golf course.

On July 4, 1996, the pool at the Village Club opened, near the property's beach along the shore of Hempstead Harbor.

Between 2000 and 2001, the nine-hole expansion to the existing golf course was constructed, designed by Tom Doak; the expansion brought the total number of holes to 18. This golf course expansion project was largely funded by the village selling nearby land that it acquired in the 1950s from W. Averill Harriman. The rebuilt and enlarged golf course opened in 2001.

== See also ==
- Sands Point Preserve
- List of golf courses designed by Robert Trent Jones
- Christopher Morley Park
- North Hills Country Club
- Sebonack Golf Club
