= Beacon Towers =

Mansion in village of Sands Point, Long Island, New York

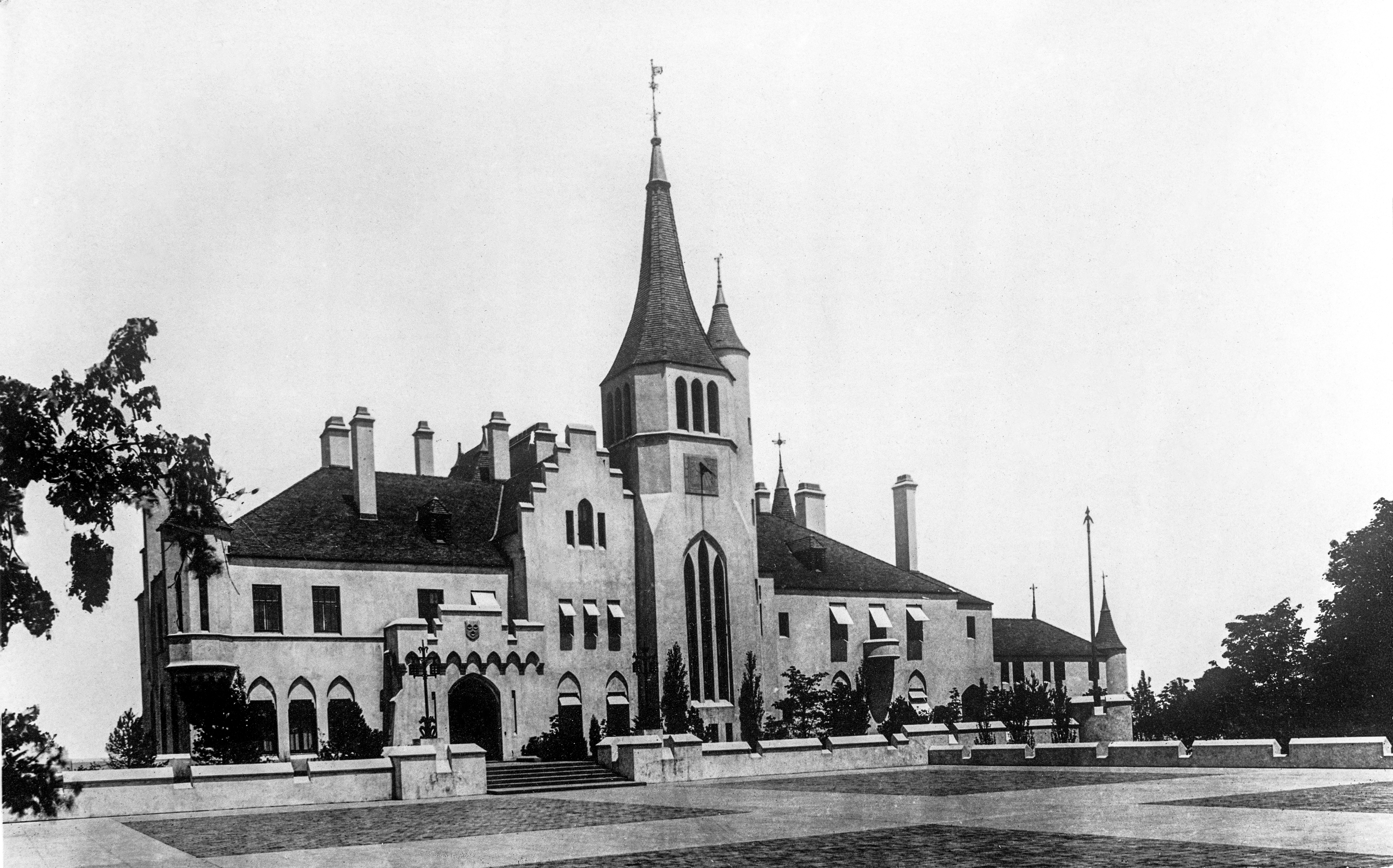
- Front facade of Beacon Towers in 1922

- Location within New York
- 40.86570°N 73.72800°W
- Location: Sands Point, New York

History
- Built: 1917–18
- Demolished: 1945

Site notes
- Architectural style: Châteauesque

Beacon Towers was a Gilded Age mansion on Sands Point in the village of Sands Point on the North Shore of Long Island, New York. It was built from 1917 to 1918 for Alva Belmont, the ex-wife of William Kissam Vanderbilt and the widow, since 1908, of Oliver Belmont.

== History ==
The mansion was designed by Hunt & Hunt, the partnership of Richard Morris Hunt's sons Richard and Joseph. It was the last Long Island house designed by the firm.

Architectural historians have described the mansion as a pure Gothic fantasy, although it did owe some of its design elements to the alcázars of Spain and to depictions of castles in medieval illuminated manuscripts. The interior contained about 60 primary rooms and upwards of 140 in total. The entire structure was coated in smooth, gleaming white stucco.

In February 1924, Belmont purchased the adjoining Sands Point Light property at auction for $100,000 ($1.9 million in present value) to add more privacy to her estate.

=== Acquired by Hearst ===
Three years later, the estate was sold to William Randolph Hearst. While Hearst owned the estate, renovations were made; the roof was raised and dormers were added, windows were expanded or removed, and the entryway was remodeled, changing the entrance to a recessed doorway.

Hearst then sold it in 1942 and it was demolished in 1945. A new development was later built on the site, but scattered structural remains and the original gatehouse survived.

== In popular culture ==
Literary scholars believe the mansion helped inspire F. Scott Fitzgerald's 1925 novel The Great Gatsby, which describes the house of Jay Gatsby as

A factual imitation of some Hotel de Ville in Normandy, with a tower on one side, spanking new under a thin bead of raw ivy, and marble swimming pool and more than forty acres of land.

— F. Scott Fitzgerald, The Great Gatsby

Beacon Towers reportedly also inspired the design of Gatsby's mansion in Baz Luhrmann's 2013 film adaptation of the novel.

Various elevations of Beacon Towers
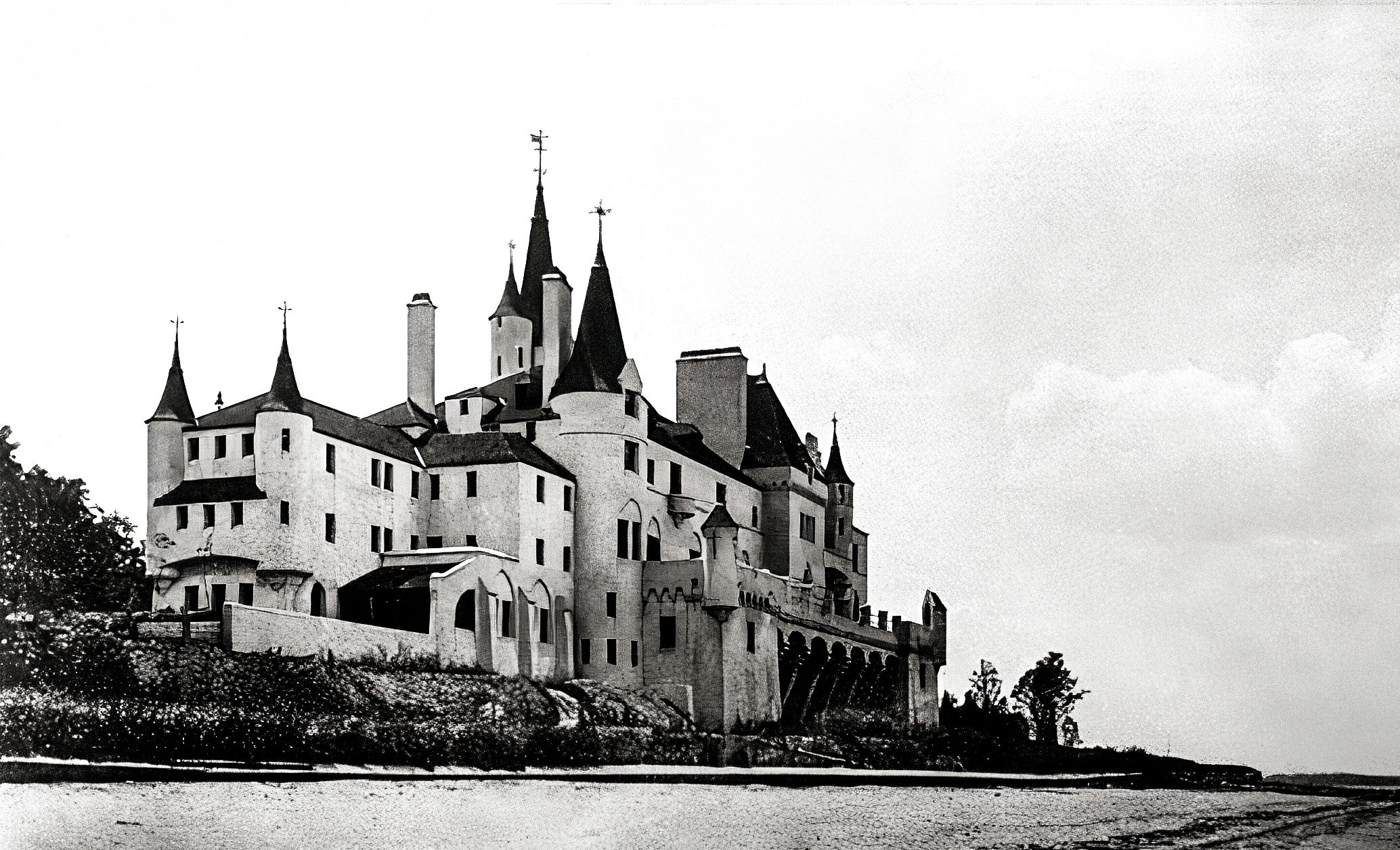
View from northeast, as seen from the beach, in 1920

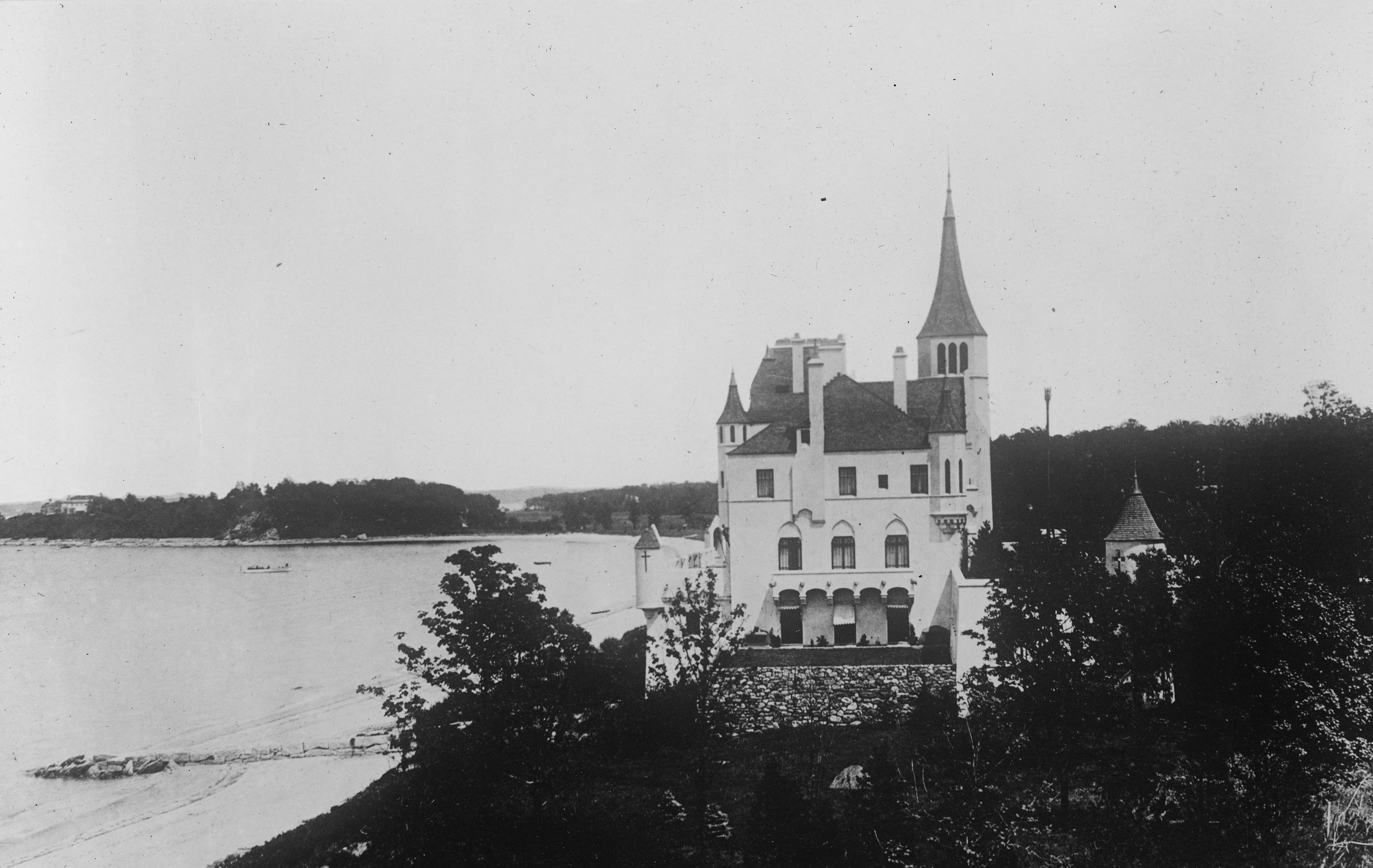
The Beacon Towers estate in 1922, showing the western elevation of the mansion. View from the Sands Point Light to Prospect Point in the background

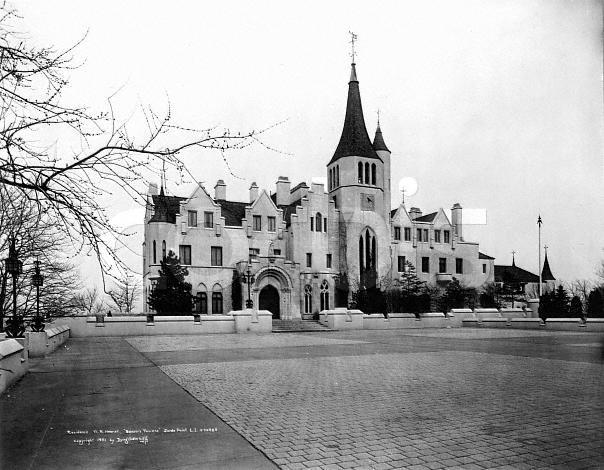
The primary facade in 1931, following renovations by William Randolph Hearst
