= John Philip Sousa House =

Historic house in New York, United States

- U.S. National Register of Historic Places
- U.S. National Historic Landmark
- New York State Register of Historic Places
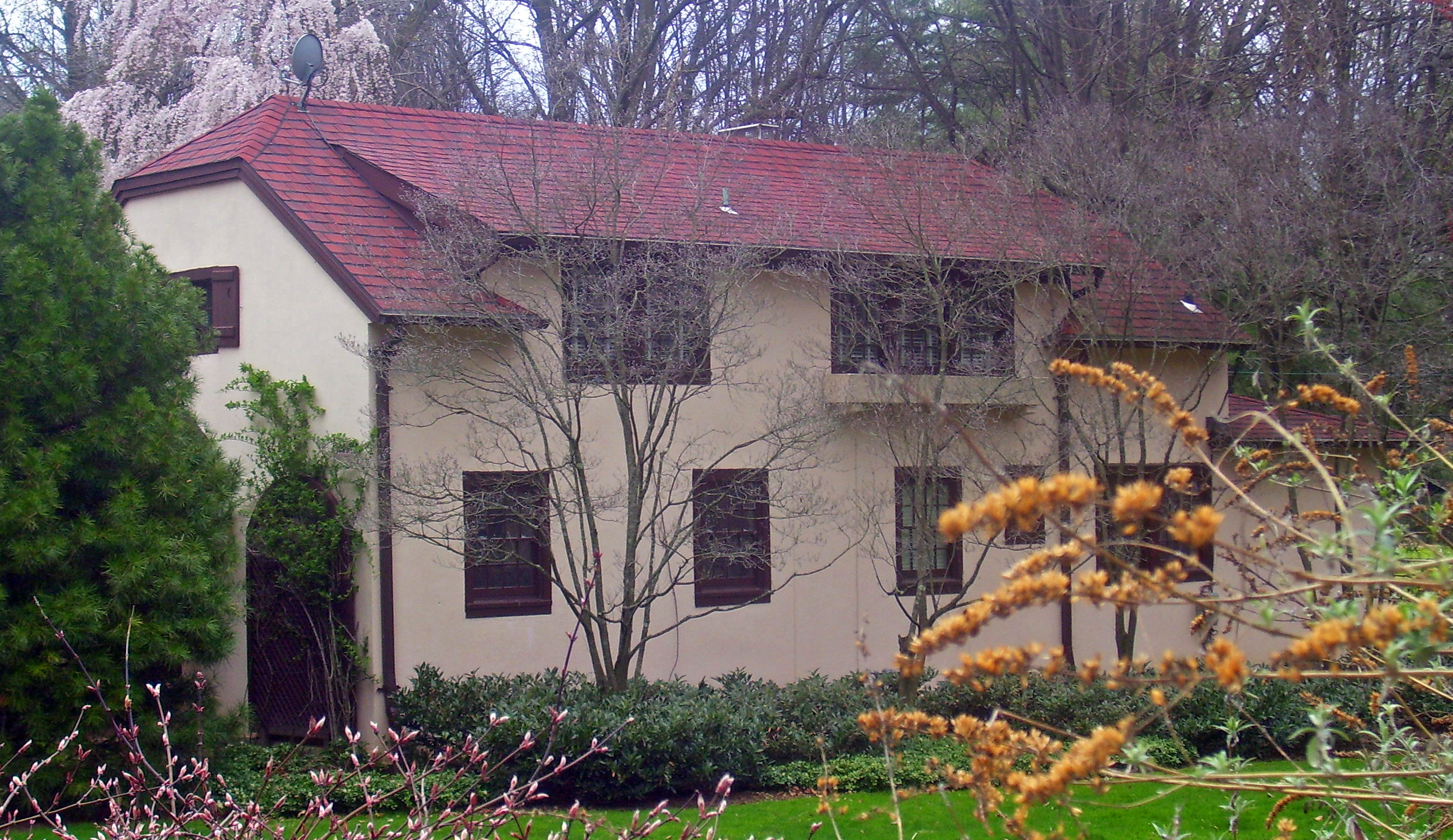
- Front cottage of Wildbank, 2008

- Location within New York Location within the United States
- Location: 12 Hicks Lane, Sands Point, New York
- Coordinates: 40°50′38.17″N 73°43′49.15″W
- Area: 1.6 acres (0.65 ha)
- Built: 1907
- Architect: A. B. Trowbridge
- NRHP reference No.: 66000532
- NYSRHP No.: 05970.000156

Significant dates
- Added to NRHP: October 15, 1966
- Designated NHL: May 23, 1966
- Designated NYSRHP: June 23, 1980

The John Philip Sousa House – also known historically as Wildbank – is a historic house at 12 Hicks Lane in Sands Point, New York, United States, overlooking Manhasset Bay.

Built in 1907, it was the home of composer and bandleader John Philip Sousa (1854–1932) from 1912 until his death in 1932. It remains a private residence as of 2026 and is not open to the public.

== Description ==
The John Philip Sousa House is located on a bluff overlooking Manhasset Bay on the North Shore of Long Island in the Sands Point area of North Hempstead. It is a rambling 2 1/2-story frame structure with a brown stucco exterior and a red tile roof. Its main block has a gabled roof oriented north–south, with a two-story wing extending east off the northern end. Porches extend along the western facade of the main block (overlooking the bay) and the south side of the wing.

Outbuildings on the property include a stable and carriage house, an L-shaped structure near Hicks Lane, which has an apartment on the upper level. Near the waterfront there is a small teahouse.

== History ==
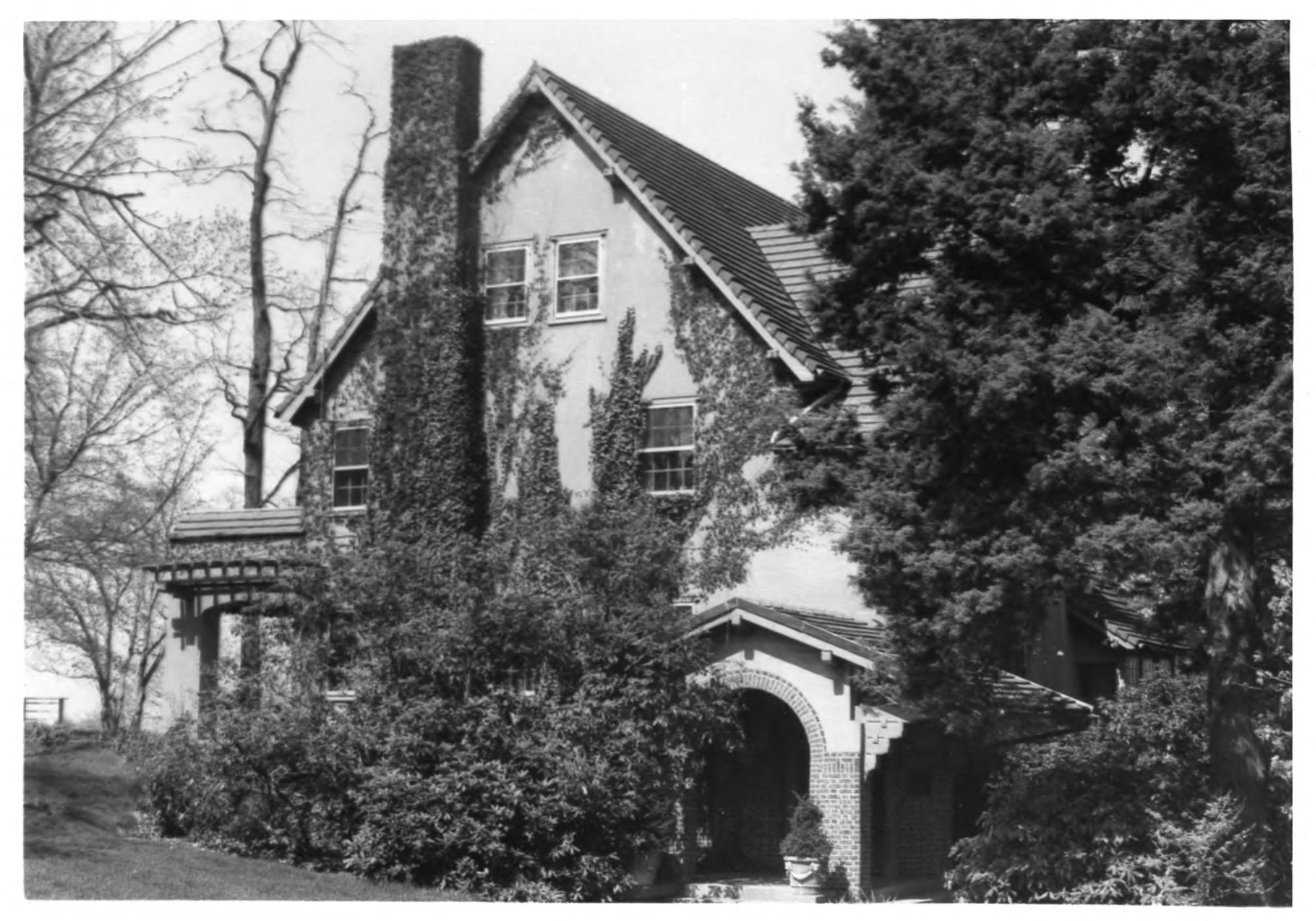
The house in 1975

The house was built in 1907 for architect Alexander Buel Trowbridge as his summer residence. In 1915, it was purchased by John Philip Sousa; it remained his home until his death in 1932. Sousa was instrumental in elevating wind ensembles and marching bands to a high level of prominence and popularity, both as a conductor of the United States Marine Band, and as the composer of hundreds of marches, many of which remain staples of the band literature.

During Sousa's ownership, the property was known as "Wildbank". It was declared a National Historic Landmark in 1966.

== See also ==
- List of National Historic Landmarks in New York
- National Register of Historic Places listings in North Hempstead (town), New York
