= Port Washington Parking District =

Special district in Long Island, New York

Coordinates: 40.8286°N 73.685°W

- Official logo

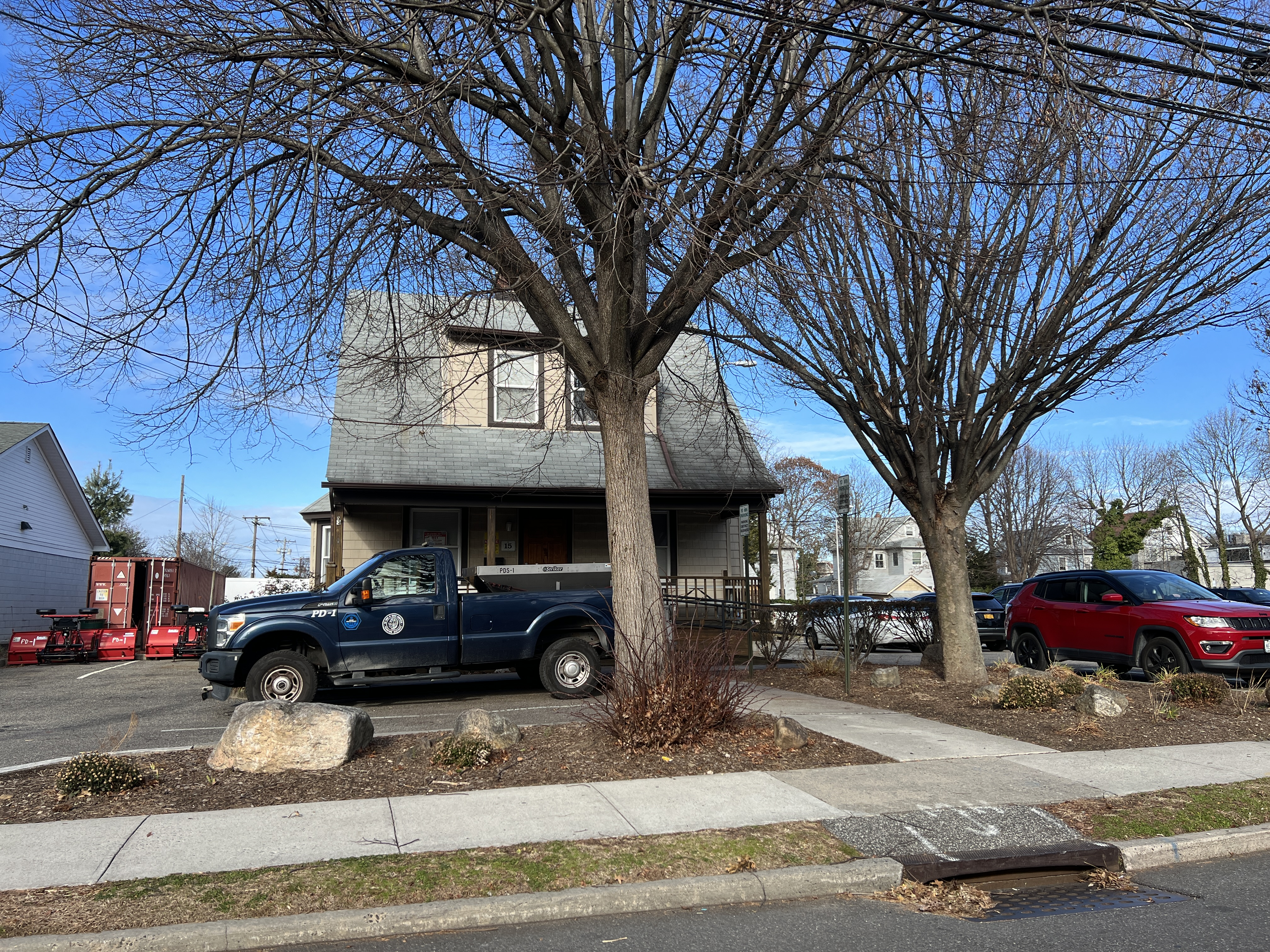
- The Port Washington Parking District's headquarters in 2023

District overview
- Formed: 1948
- Type: Parking
- Status: Active
- Headquarters: 15 Vanderventer Avenue; Port Washington, New York, United States
- Website: goportparking.org/rppportal/

Map
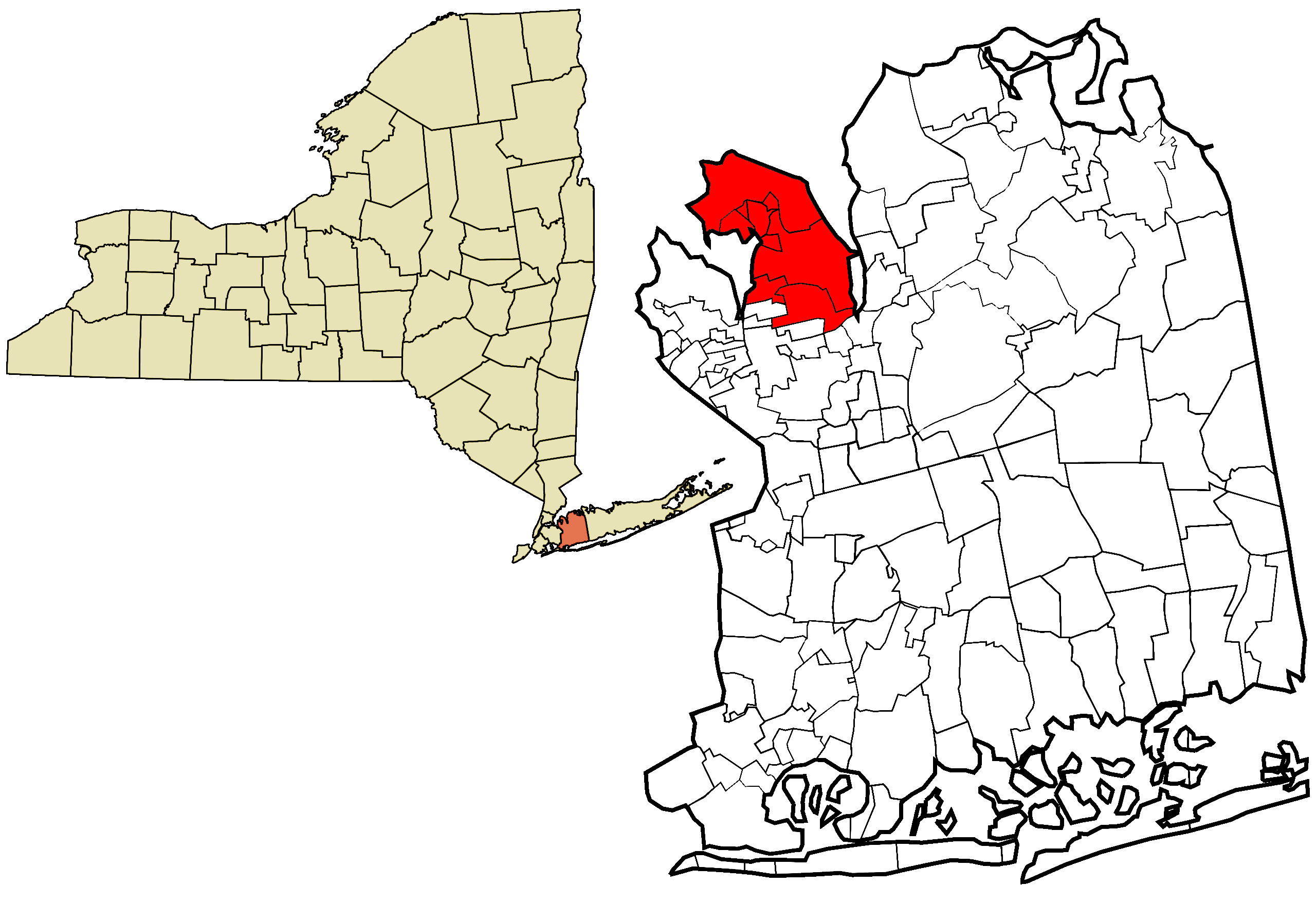
- Map of the Port Washington Parking District, highlighted in red.

The Port Washington Parking District – also known as the Port Washington Public Parking District or simply PWPPD – is a special district in northwestern Nassau County, on Long Island, in New York, United States.

Operated by the Town of North Hempstead, this special district handles public parking matters within the Greater Port Washington area, located on Long Island's Cow Neck Peninsula.

== History ==
The Port Washington Parking District was established by the Town of North Hempstead in 1948, with the purpose of establishing, maintaining, and regulating parking facilities and parking meters in Port Washington's downtown area, such as for local commuters using the Port Washington Long Island Rail Road station, shoppers, and merchants.

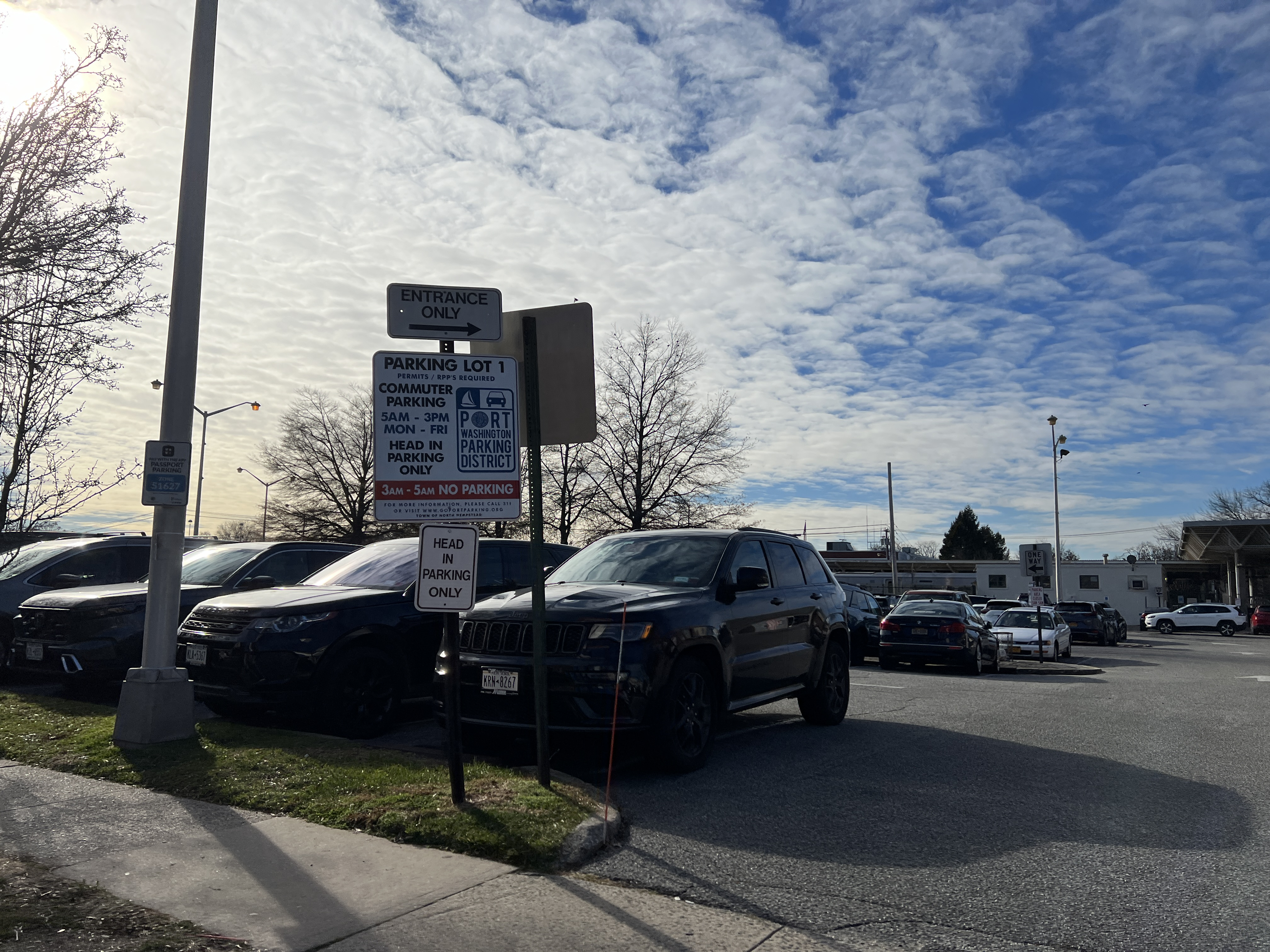
Parking Field 1 in 2023

For the construction of several of the parking fields, most notably between the 1940s and 1960s, the Port Washington Parking District used eminent domain to acquire several of the lots needed for the parking facilities.

In 1959, the district opened its main commuter parking lot at the Port Washington LIRR station, with enough parking spaces for 411 cars. The construction of this lot more than doubled the commuter parking capacity at the station; its construction required land swaps between the Town of North Hempstead and the Long Island Rail Road, and the rail freight depot was relocated roughly 0.5 miles (0.80 km) from its original location for its construction.

In 1969, the boundaries of the parking district were expanded, taking in several incorporated villages surrounding the hamlet of Port Washington (Baxter Estates, Flower Hill, Manorhaven, Port Washington North, and Sands Point). As a result of the expansion, legislation was enacted limiting parking at the Port Washington LIRR station to residents of the parking district.

As of 2022, the Port Washington Parking District operates 12 parking fields, some of which require residential permits exclusively available to district residents or merchants between certain hours and on certain days (specifically the commuter and merchant lots).

== Communities served ==
The Port Washington Parking District serves the following communities:

- Baxter Estates
- Flower Hill
- Manorhaven
- Port Washington
- Port Washington North
- Plandome Manor
- Sands Point

== See also ==
- Port Washington Police District
- Port Washington Water District
- Port Washington Water Pollution Control District
- Special districts in New York (state)
