= Eugene Borowitz =

American philosopher in Reform Judaism (1924–2016)

Rabbi Eugene Borowitz
- Born: February 20, 1924; Columbus, Ohio, U.S.
- Died: January 22, 2016 (aged 91); Stamford, Connecticut, U.S.
- Education: Ohio State University, Columbia University, HUC-JIR
- Occupations: writer, philosopher
- Years active: 1948–2016
- Awards: National Jewish Book Award (1974); Maurice N. Eisendrath Bearer of Light Award (2005)

Eugene B. Borowitz (February 20, 1924 – January 22, 2016) was an American leader and philosopher in Reform Judaism, known largely for his work on Jewish theology and Jewish ethics. He also edited a Jewish journal, Sh'ma, and taught at the Hebrew Union College-Jewish Institute of Religion.

He was awarded the Maurice N. Eisendrath Bearer of Light Award by the Union for Reform Judaism (2005), selected as a Scholar of Distinction for a retrospective on his work by the Jewish Publication Society (2002) and given the Jewish Cultural Achievement medal for scholarship by the National Foundation for Jewish Culture. He received the National Jewish Book Award (1974) for The Mask Jews Wear. Jewish Spiritual Journeys: Essays in Honor of Eugene B. Borowitz on his 70th Birthday was published in his honor in 1997.

As is apparent from a bibliography of his works, Borowitz was a prolific author.

During the Korean War, he served as a chaplain for the U.S. Navy. Borowitz held degrees from Ohio State University, Columbia University and HUC-JIR.

== Early life ==
Borowitz grew up in Columbus, Ohio, and attended Ohio State University where he studied philosophy. After graduation, he went to Hebrew Union College in Cincinnati, where he was ordained as a Rabbi in 1948 and received his D.H.L. in 1950.

== Career ==
Borowitz became the founding rabbi of The Community Synagogue in Port Washington, New York, while at the same time pursuing a PhD. in religion from the joint program sponsored by Columbia University and Union Theological Seminary. In 1957, he was appointed as director of the Religious Education Department of the Union of American Hebrew Congregations. Because of this, he switched to Columbia's doctoral program in education and received the Ed.D. in 1958. From 1962 until his death, he was a faculty member at the New York campus of Hebrew Union College-Jewish Institute of Religion, where he became the Sigmund L. Falk Distinguished Professor Emeritus of Education and Jewish Religious Thought. He was elected as the first Jewish president of the American Theological Society in 1981 and served until 1982 He celebrated his hundredth semester with the college in 2012.

Borowitz is best known for his development of "covenant theology," a term he first introduced in a 1961 article in Commentary. His work concerned itself with the dilemma of the postmodern Jew: committed to individual autonomy, but nevertheless involved with God, Torah and Israel. His interest in redefining covenant led him to significant work in normative ethics, some of which was collected in his book Exploring Jewish Ethics (264), and his teaching on the subject led to the volume, Reform Jewish Ethics and the Halakhah (298). Borowitz's work in covenant theology found its mature expression in his 1991 book, Renewing the Covenant (273).

One of Borowitz's most significant accomplishments was his founding of Sh'ma, a Journal of Jewish Responsibility in 1970. He was its publisher and editor for twenty-three years, and he served as Senior Editor from 1993 to 1997. Sh'ma provided a forum where voices from all segments of the Jewish community could be heard on a wide range of controversial topics. Borowitz wrote numerous short book reviews for Sh'ma.

== Personal life ==
Borowitz was a committed civil rights activist, who was arrested during a sit-in with young black people in a segregated restaurant. He was married to Estelle Covel Borowitz, a psychologist. They had five children together. Borowitz died on January 22, 2016, at the age of 91 at his home in Stamford, Connecticut.

== Selected publications and edited works ==
- Eugene B. Borowitz: Rethinking God and Ethics, Eds. Hava Tirosh-Samuelson and Aaron w. Hughes, Boston, MA: BRILL, 2014.
- Renewing the Covenant, translation by Menashe Arbel and Ilon Shamir, Eds. Ilon Shamir and Yehoyadah Amir, Tel Aviv: HaKibbutz HaMeuchad, 2014.
- A Touch of the Sacred: A Theologian's Informal Guide to Jewish Belief (with Frances W. Schwartz), Woodstock, VT: Jewish Lights Publishing, 2007.
- A Life in Covenant: the Complete Works of Eugene B. Borowitz, 1944-2007, by Amy W. Helfman, updated by Sarah Wolf, 2007.
- The Talmud's Theological Language-Game, a Philosophical Discourse Analysis. Albany, NY: State University of New York Press, 2006.
- Studies in the Meaning of Judaism. Philadelphia: the Jewish Publication Society. 2002.
- Reviewing the Covenant: Eugene B. Borowitz and the Postmodern Renewal of Jewish Theology, Peter Ochs with Eugene B. Borowitz. Albany, NY: State University of New York Press, 2000.
- Judaism After Modernity, Papers from a Decade of Fruition. Lanham, MD: University Press of America, 1999.
- The Jewish Moral Virtues (with Frances W. Schwartz). Philadelphia: the Jewish Publication Society, 1999.
- Choices in Modern Jewish Thought (2nd ed.). W. Orange, NJ: Behrman House, 1995.
- Renewing the Covenant. Philadelphia: Jewish Publication Society, 1991.
- Exploring Jewish Ethics Detroit: Wayne State University Press, 1990.
- Explaining Reform Judaism (With Naomi Patz) New York: Behrman House, 1985. Liberal Judaism New York: Union of American Hebrew Congregations, 1984.

== Selected works ==
- Contemporary Christologies: A Jewish Response. US: Paulist Press International, 1980.
- Exploring Jewish Ethics: Papers on Covenant Responsibility. Detroit: Wayne State University Press, 1990.
- Liberal Judaism. New York: Union of American Hebrew Congregations, 1984.
- Reform Jewish Ethics and the Halakhah: An Experiment in Decision Making (Editor). Behrman House Publishing, 1995.
- Renewing the Covenant: A Theology for the Postmodern Jew. Philadelphia: Jewish Publication Society, 1991.
- The Talmud's Theological Language-Game, a Philosophical Discourse Analysis. Albany: State University of New York, 2006.

== Sources ==
- Batnitzky, Leora. "Postmodernity and historicity : reflections on Eugene Borowitz’s postmodern turn" in Religious Studies Review, 27,4 (2001): 363-369.
- Borowitz, Eugene B., Yudit Kornberg Greenberg, Susan Handelman, David Novak, Peter Ochs, Thomas Ogletree, Norbert Samuelson, Edith Wyschogrod. Reviewing the Covenant: Eugene B. Borowitz and the Postmodern Renewal of Jewish Theology. Edited by Peter Ochs. Albany: SUNY Press, 2000.
- Breslauer, S. Daniel. "Building a postmodern Reform Judaism : the example of Eugene B. Borowitz" in Platforms and Prayer Books: Theological and Liturgical Perspectives on Reform Judaism. Edited by Dana Evan Kaplan, 247-260. Rowman & Littlefield Publishers, 2002.
- Breslauer, S. Daniel. "[On] Eugene B. Borowitz, 'Reform Judaism Today: Book Two: What We Believe' (1977)" in Judaism 28,3 (1979): 382-384.
- Cooper, Simon. Contemporary covenantal thought : interpretations of covenant in the thought of David Hartman and Eugene Borowitz (2012)
- Daum, Robert A. "Two views on authority -Bleich and Borowitz" in Journal of Reform Judaism 33,1 (1986): 55-64.
- Dorff, Elliot. "Autonomy vs. community: the ongoing Reform/Conservative difference" in Conservative Judaism 48,2 (1996): 64-68.
- Duff, Nancy J. "[On] Eugene B. Borowitz, "Contemporary Christologies: a Jewish Response" in Union Seminary Quarterly Review 38, 2 (1983): 231-235.
- Ellison, David Harry. "Eugene B. Borowitz" in Interpreters of Judaism in the Late Twentieth Century, 17-39. Edited by Stephen T. Katz. B'nai B'rith Book Service 1993.
- Ellison, David Harry. "Eugene B. Borowitz: a tribute" in Jewish Book Annual 51 (1993): 125-236.
- Helfman, Amy W. . "Bibliography of the writings of Eugene B. Borowitz" in Eugene B. Borowitz: Studies in the Meaning of Judaism (JPS Scholar of Distinction Series), 443-465. Philadelphia: Jewish Publication Society, 2002.
- Kolodny, Ralph L. . "Catholics and Father Coughlin: Misremembering the past" in Patterns of Prejudice 19, 4 (1985): 156-25.
- Kraut, Benny. "A liberal Jew looks at Christianity" in Tradition 21, 4 (1985) 80-86.
- Levitt, Laura S. . "Covenant or contract? Marriage as theology" in Cross Currents 48,2 (1998): 169-184.
- Melamed, Abraham. "[On] Eugene B. Borowitz, 'Renewing the Covenant : a Theology for the Postmodern Jew' (1991)" in Jewish Political Studies Review 6,1-2 (1994): 179-186.
- Mittleman, Alan Lee. "[On] Eugene B. Borowitz, 'Renewing the Covenant: a Theology for the Postmodern Jew' (1991)" in Jewish Political Studies Review 6,1-2 (1994): 173-179.
- Ochs, Peter W. . "Borowitz and the postmodern renewal of theology" in Cross Currents 43,2 (1993): 164-183.
- Samuelson, Norbert Max. "A critique of Borowitz’s postmodern Jewish theology" in Zygon 28,2 (1993): 267-282.
- Talmage, Frank Ephraim. "[On] Eugene B. Borowitz, "Contemporary Christologies : a Jewish Response" in Journal of Reform Judaism 30, 3 (1983): 72-75.
- Weiss, Andrea L. "Creative readings of the covenant: a Jewish-Christian approach" in Journal of Ecumenical Studies 30,3-4 (1993): 389-402
- Yuter, Alan J. "A theology for liberal Jews : is it possible? A reflection on Eugene Borowitz’s 'Renewing the Covenant; a Theology for the Postmodern Jew' (1991)" in Le’ela, 35 (1993) 29-32.
