= Flower Hill Cemetery (Flower Hill, New York) =

Historic site in Nassau County, New York

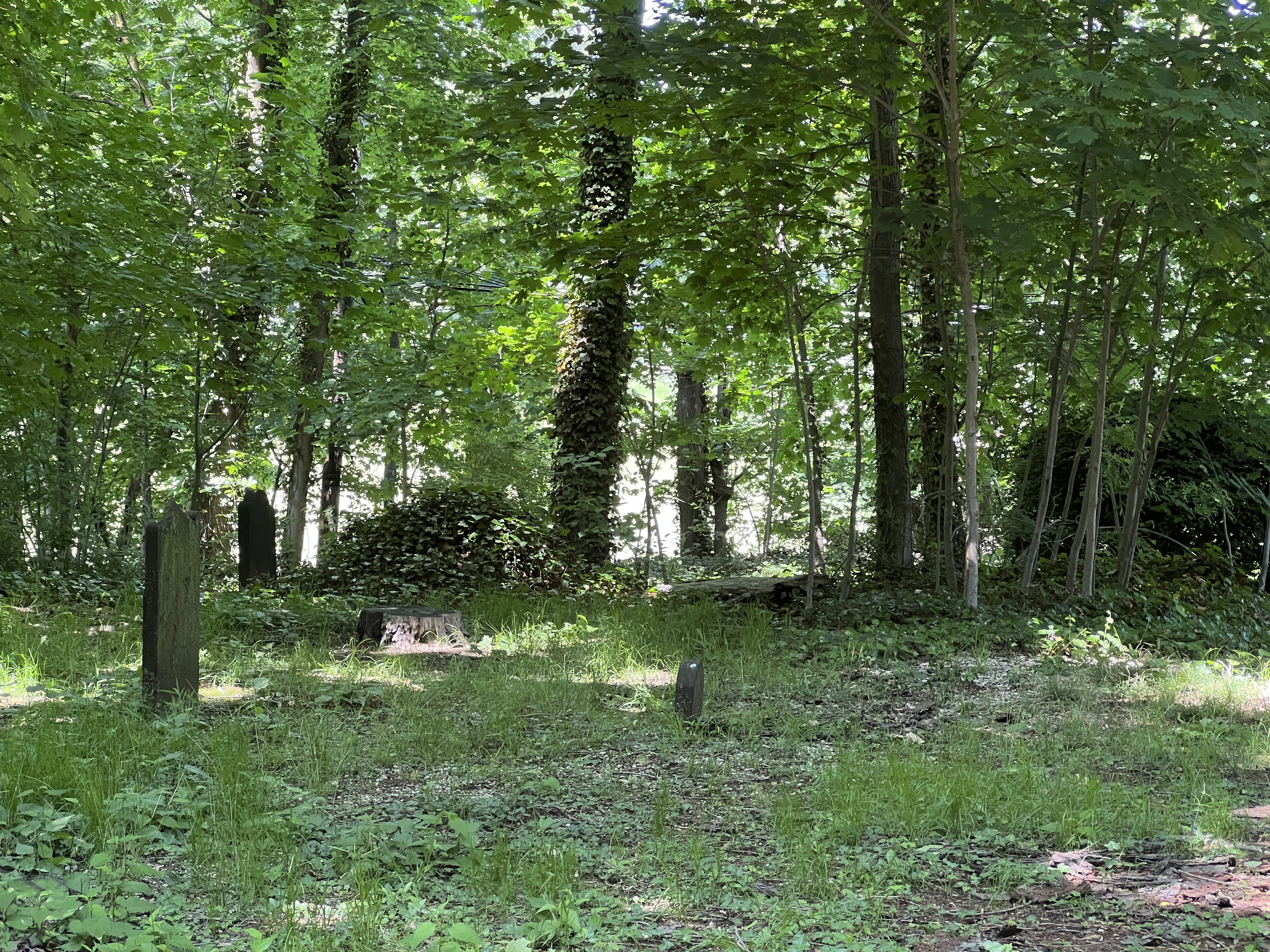
- The cemetery in May 2023
- Interactive map of Flower Hill Cemetery

Details
- Established: 1798
- Closed: 1896
- Location: Country Club Drive, Flower Hill, New York, US
- Coordinates: 40°48′38.0″N 73°40′33.5″W
- Type: Historic; inactive
- Owned by: Village of Flower Hill
- Size: .36 acres (0.15 ha)
- No. of interments: 10 known
- Village of Flower Hill Landmark; Designated April 3, 2023

The Flower Hill Cemetery (also known as the Burtis Cemetery and the Old Cemetery at Flower Hill) is a landmarked, historic cemetery located within the Incorporated Village of Flower Hill, in the Town of North Hempstead, in Nassau County, on the North Shore of Long Island, in New York, United States.

== Description ==
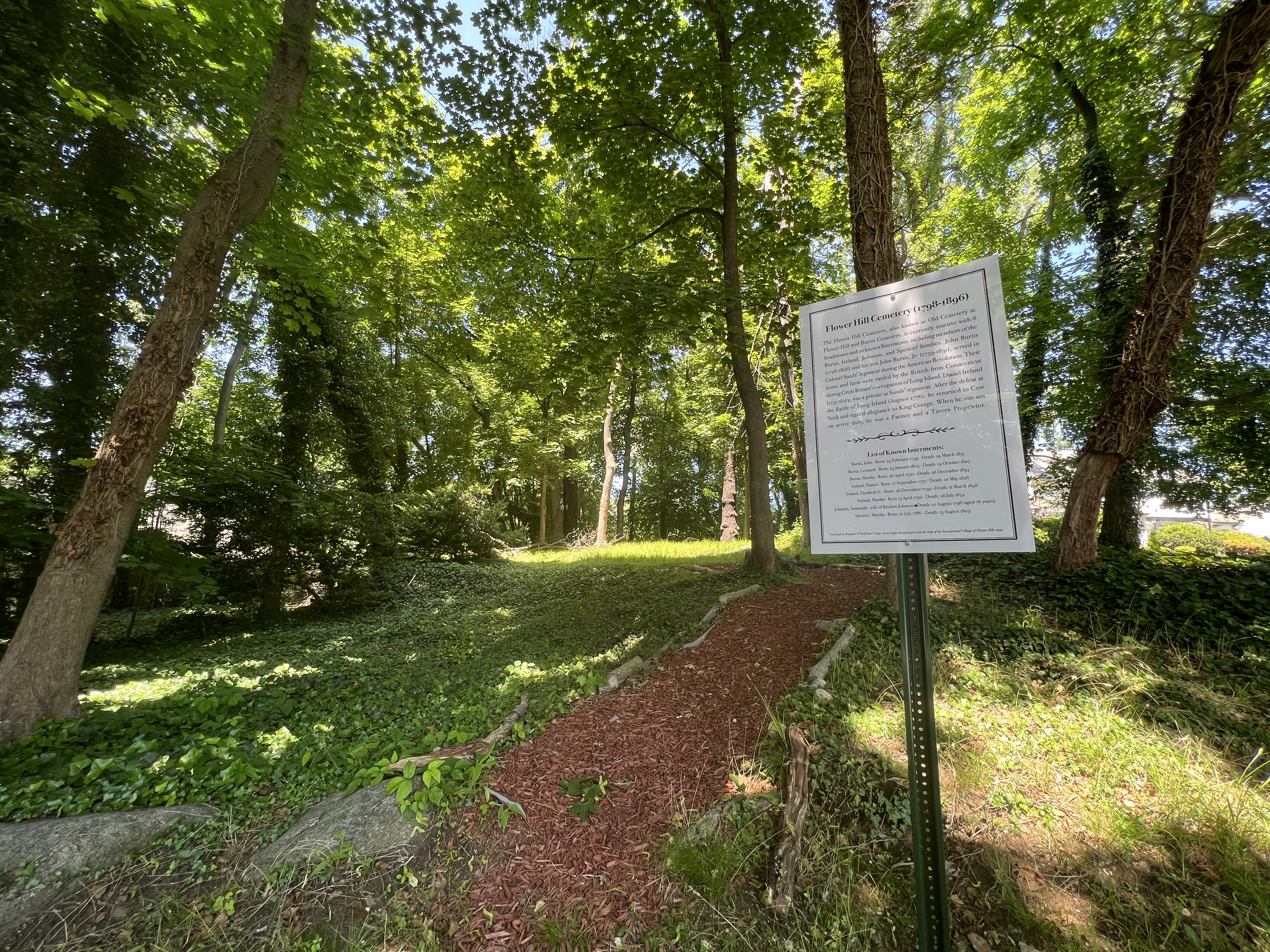
The cemetery, as seen from its entrance at Country Club Drive in 2023

The Flower Hill Cemetery, which dates back to the American Revolution-era, was active between 1798 and 1896. It is one of the oldest extant sites within Flower Hill. Many prominent locals from this time period are buried at this cemetery, including members of the Burtis family, which owned a farm located partially over what is now the North Hempstead Country Club. It is owned by the Incorporated Village of Flower Hill.

In 2010, a local resident, James Morgan McLaughlin, arranged a cleanup effort of the cemetery, as part of his Eagle Scout project. One year later, in 2011, ownership of the property was transferred from the Town of North Hempstead to the Village of Flower Hill.

The cemetery was designated a Village of Flower Hill Historic Landmark on April 3, 2023. It is eligible for listing on both the New York State Register of Historic Places and the National Register of Historic Places.

== Notable interments ==
The Flower Hill Cemetery has a total of eight headstones and ten known interments.

Some notable interments include:

- Burtis, John
- Burtis, Leonard
- Burtis, Martha
- Ireland, Daniel
- Ireland, Elizabeth Sands
- Ireland, Martha
- Johnson, Susannah
- Spencer, Martha

== See also ==
- Monfort Cemetery
- Roslyn Cemetery
- Sands Family Cemetery
