= The Community Synagogue =

Synagogue in New York, United States

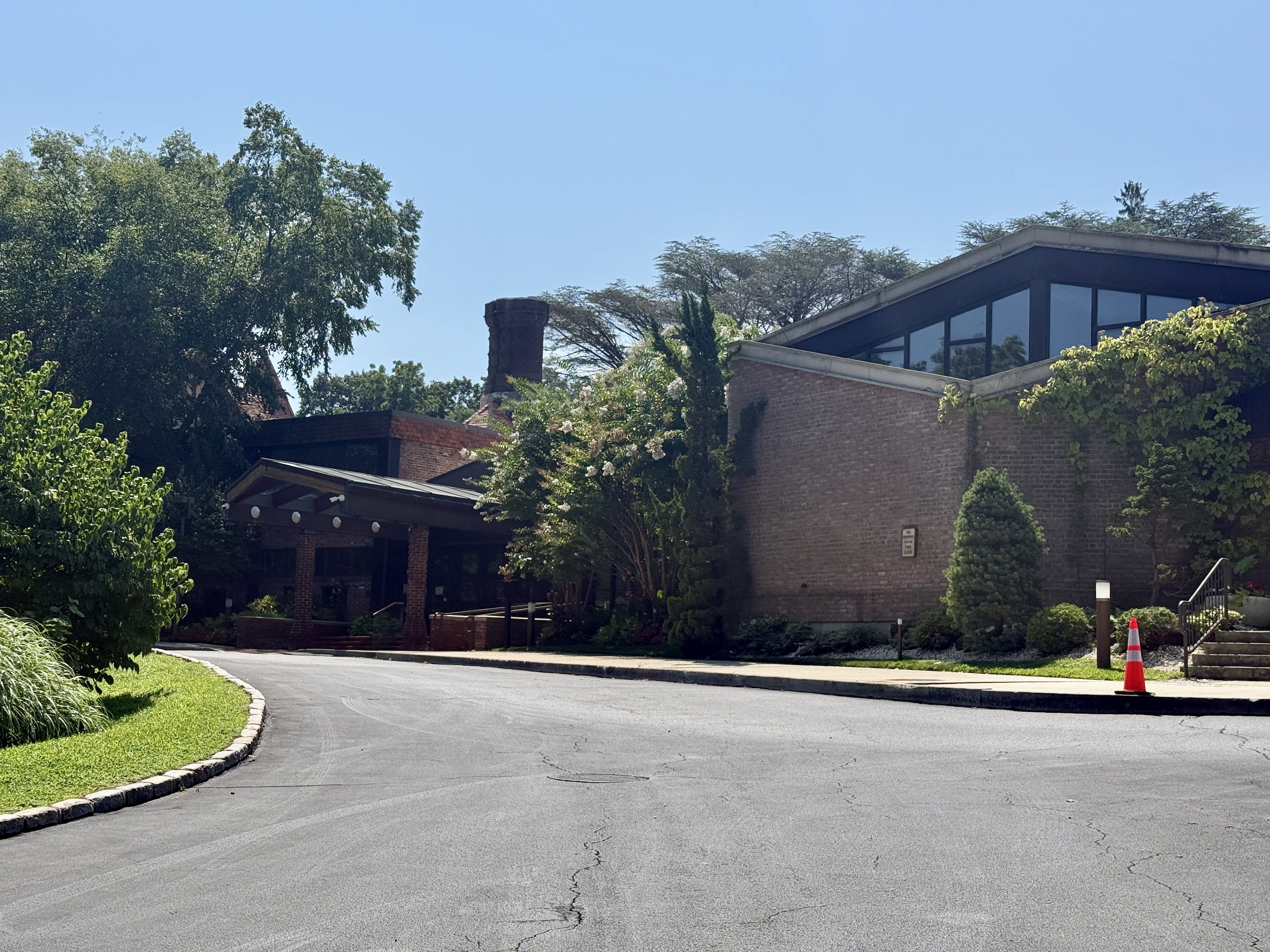
- Temple Beth Israel in 2026

- Location on Long Island, New York

Religion
- Affiliation: Reform Judaism
- Ecclesiastical or organisational status: Synagogue
- Leadership: Rabbis Melissa Buyer-Witman, Lyle S Rothman, and Jade Sank Ross
- Status: Active

Location
- Location: 160 Middle Neck Road, Port Washington, NY 11577
- Municipality: Incorporated Village of Sands Point
- Country: United States
- Administration: Union for Reform Judaism
- Coordinates: 40°51′22″N 73°42′32″W

Architecture
- Architects: Edgar Irving Williams (mansion); Stanley Katz (purpose-built wing)
- Type: Synagogue
- Established: 1952 (as a congregation)
- Completed: c.1926 (mansion); 1950s (purpose-built wing)

Website
- www.commsyn.org

The Community Synagogue (also known as The Community Synagogue of Port Washington and TCS, and historically as The Community Synagogue, Temple Beth Am: The House of the People) is a Reform synagogue located within The Chimneys – a historic Gold Coast-era mansion – at 160 Middle Neck Road in the Incorporated Village of Sands Point, on Long Island, New York, United States.

== Description ==
The Community Synagogue was established in 1952. It is affiliated with the Union for Reform Judaism.

As of 2026, the congregation's rabbis are Melissa Buyer-Witman, Lyle S Rothman, and Jade Sank Ross, and its cantors are Claire Franco and Ella Gladstone Martin.

== History ==
The synagogue was first established in 1952, as The Community Synagogue, Temple Beth Am: The House of the People. It held its first services on February 9 of that year, in a temporary location at Port Washington's local American Legion hall. Later that year, it purchased a property in the Harbor Acres section of Sands Point for use as its new, permanent home. However, after neighbors objected to the synagogue using the property and commenced a court matter against the synagogue to fight the sale, the congregation decided not to use that land, and instead continued searching for a suitable property.

In 1953, the congregation appointed Eugene Borowitz as its first full-time rabbi; Borowitz is considered to be The Community Synagogue's founding rabbi.

In 1954, the congregation proposed purchasing The Chimneys – a historic Sands Point mansion and its current home, which had just been listed for sale on the market – for use as its new, permanent home. However, resistance to the synagogue's use of the property arose. The village soon thereafter denied the synagogue's application to use the property as a synagogue, and the congregation appealed the denial to the village's zoning appeals board. On September 8, 1955, after two years of debate the two parties, the Village of Sands Point Board of Zoning Appeals denied the congregation's appeal – a decision vocally criticized by village resident and then New York Governor W. Averill Harriman, who referred to the decision as "arbitrary."

On August 29, 1955 – a few days prior to the decision to deny the appeal, village trustee William I. Stoddard proposed acquiring portions of Harriman's Sands Point property for a village hall and village park. When village officials asked Harriman whether he would be willing to offer the village a portion of his property for such purposes, Harriman responded on September 8 – in the same communication expressing his disapproval of the village denying the synagogue's appeal – by offering as much land as it needed, under the one condition that the synagogue plans be approved. Village officials agreed to Harriman's deal; the synagogue was approved, and the village was then able to acquire the land it wanted from Harriman.

Soon thereafter, on July 11, 1956, the New York Court of Appeals sided six-to-one with the congregation in landmark decision on the matter – Matter of Community Synagogue v. Bates, 1 N.Y.2d 445 (1956), and the congregation subsequently completed its purchase of the 24.5-acre (9.9 ha) estate property. The first services were held at this property three weeks later, and The Chimneys was formally dedicated as The Community Synagogue's permanent home on June 1, 1957.

Shortly after its dedication in 1957, the congregation soon announced plans to build a new wing with dedicated, purpose-built synagogue facilities. This new wing – connected to the historic mansion and designed by architect Stanley Katz – would house the new sanctuary and social hall, while the original mansion would be preserved and continue to be used by the congregation.

The synagogue underwent a major expansion in 2008.

== The Chimneys ==
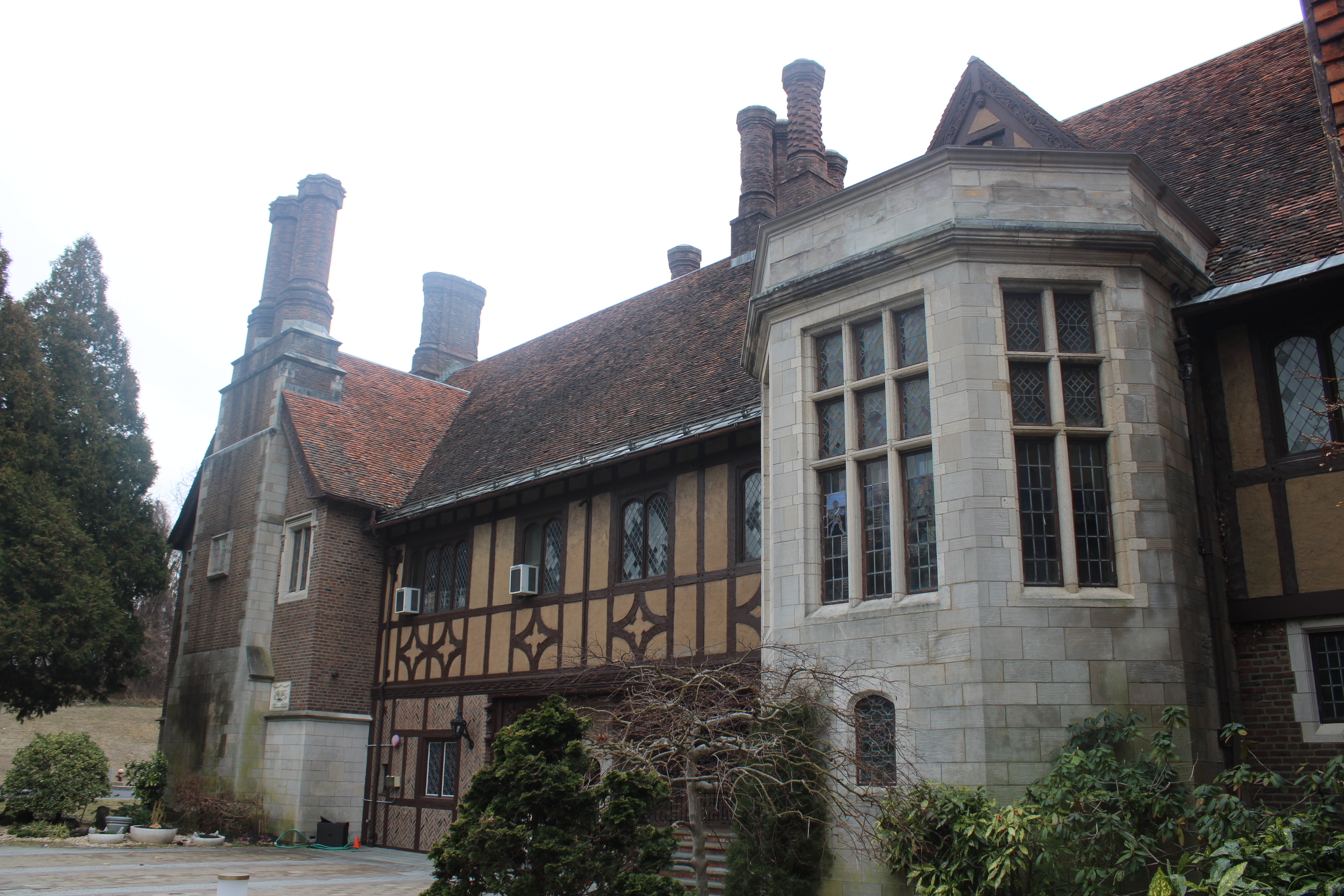
The Chimneys in 2026

The Chimneys is a historic Gold Coast-era mansion located at 160 Middle Neck Road in the Incorporated Village of Sands Point, on Long Island, New York, United States. It is presently used as a synagogue.

=== Description ===
The mansion was first built circa 1926 for Bettie Fleischmann Holmes, and was designed by architect Edgar Irving Williams. Fleischmann was one of the three children born to the founder of the Fleischmann's Yeast, and was a president of the Cincinnati Symphony Orchestra, succeeding First Lady Helen Herron Taft.

It was purchased in the 1950s by The Community Synagogue of Port Washington, which subsequently converted the building into a Reform Jewish synagogue. The synagogue dedicated its home in the mansion in 1957, and an extension with the present sanctuary and social hall –designed by Stanley Katz – was subsequently built shortly thereafter. This new extension was designed by Katz to complement the original portion of the building.

As of 2026, the mansion remains owned – and used – by The Community Synagogue.

== See also ==
- Reconstructionist Synagogue of the North Shore
- Temple Beth Israel (Port Washington, New York)
- Temple Sinai (Roslyn, New York)
