= Monfort Cemetery =

Historic cemetery in Port Washington, Long Island, New York, United States

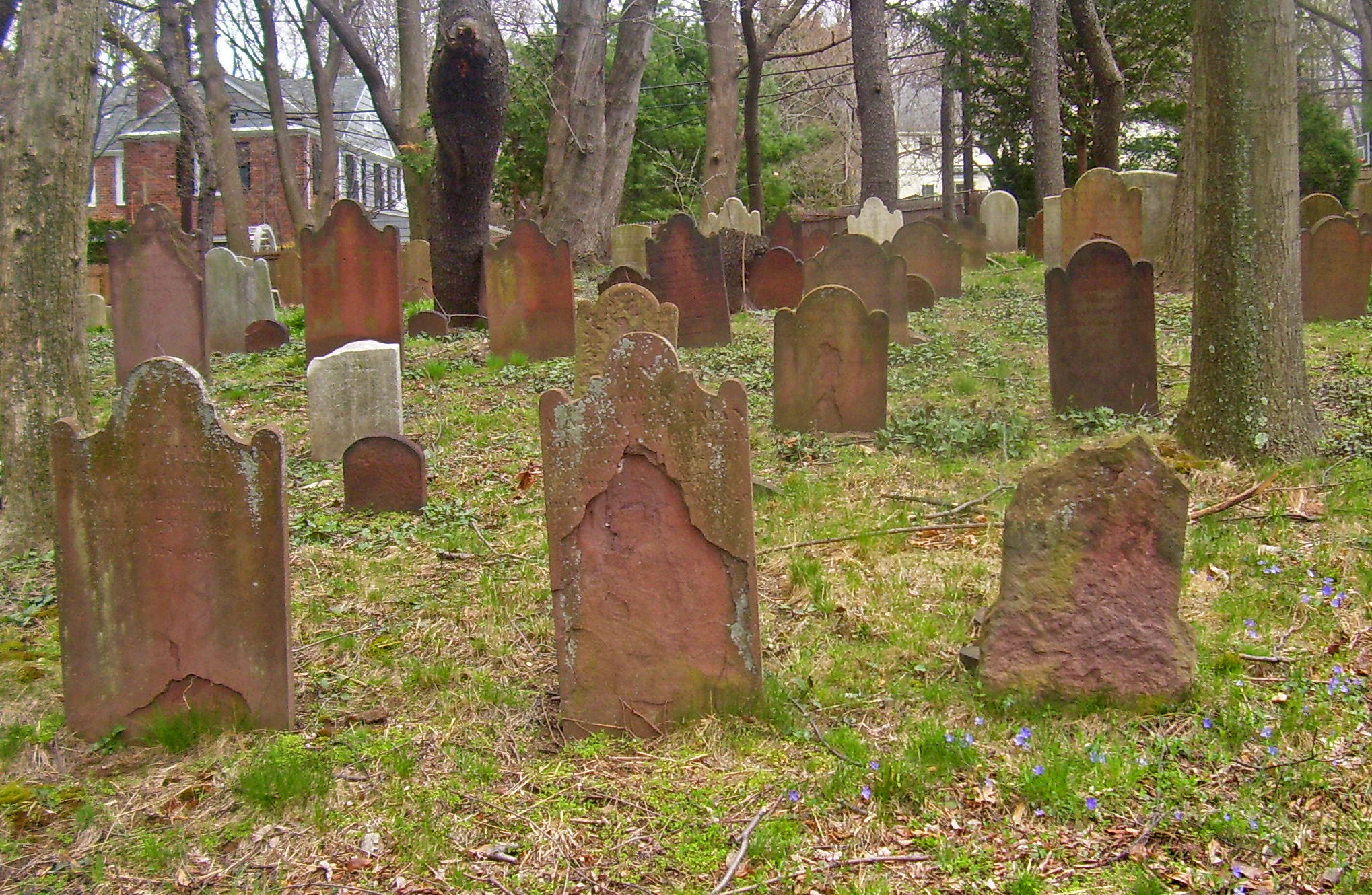
- Cemetery in 2008
- Interactive map of Monfort Cemetery

Details
- Established: 1737
- Location: E of Main St. and Port Washington Blvd., Port Washington, New York
- Country: United States
- Coordinates: 40°49′52″N 73°40′57″W
- Type: public
- Owned by: Town of North Hempstead
- Size: Less than 1 acre (3,920 m²)
- No. of graves: 151
- Find a Grave: Monfort Cemetery
- Monfort Cemetery
- U.S. National Register of Historic Places
- NRHP reference No.: 87002301
- Added to NRHP: January 7, 1988

Monfort Cemetery is a historic cemetery located 250 feet (76 m) east of the intersection of Port Washington Boulevard (NY 101) and Main Street in Port Washington, New York, United States.

== Description ==
The cemetery contains 153 graves of early Dutch settlers of Cow Neck (as today's Port Washington was then known), revolutionary war patriots, and prominent leaders of North Hempstead, buried from 1737 to 1892.

The cemetery is approximately 1/3 of an acre, surrounded by tall oak trees, and previously known as the Flower Hill Cemetery and Old Dutch Burying Grounds. It is fenced off and locked, not open to the public. The graves are arranged in 13 rows by family.

Originally it was part of the 110 acre Rapelje farm. The 1-acre (4,000 m^{2}) burial ground was separated from Rapelje's farm and sold in July, 1786 to members of the Onderdonk, Schenck, Rapaeje, Hegeman and Dodge families. The earliest-dated markers are those of Andries Onderdonk and his wife Geertruy, which date to 1731 and 1738 respectively.

All headstones face west. The markers, mostly sandstone but for a few in marble, show a variation in styles consistent with their time periods. Eighteenth-century markers are sandstone detailed with "soul effigies", a tripartite lobed top with a face in the center and other decoration in the wings. By the end of that century and the beginning of the next, the lobed top was plain, the inscriptions began with "In Memory" or "In Memoriam", and there are at least two marble headstones with the willow-and-urn motif common in neoclassical gravestones from the 1820s on. The last graves, from the late 19th century, are made of unadorned marble, common to that time. All the tombstones seem to rise naturally out of the ground, moldy and ancient.

In 1908, the farm where the cemetery is located was inherited by the Monforts, In 1984, Burtis Monfort deeded the cemetery to the Town of North Hempstead. It was designated a Town of North Hempstead Landmark in 1985 and added to the National Register of Historic Places in 1988. The Pomeroy Foundation awarded a historical plaque in 2018. In 2021, the Long Island chapter of the Sons of the American Revolution identified 12 Revolutionary War Patriots interred in the cemetery and designated it as a 250th anniversary site of the American Revolution.

== Notable burials ==
Among the 12 Revolutionary War Patriots are four signers of North Hempstead's 1775 "Declaration of Independence" from then-Loyalist Hempstead. The bitterness of this conflict led New York State to divide Hempstead into two separate counties after the war. The Town of North Hempstead was incorporated in 1784. The four patriots buried here who signed the declaration are:

- Adrian Onderdonk (1726-1794), who was taken prisoner by the British for two months in 1776, released after two months and later elected the first town supervisor of : Hempstead.
- Thomas Dodge (1721-1789), who was also an officer in the Coe Neck Militia
- Martin Schenck (1740–1793), who was also Treasurer of Queens County (1786-1792)
- Petrus Onderdonk (1730-1793), who was also an officer in Cow Neck Militia

Other prominent community leaders include:

- Andrew Onderdonk (1756–1793) was a captain in the militia and later a New York State Senator.
- Joseph Onderdonk (1766–1852) was present at George Washington's inauguration as a young man and later introduced modern techniques to local agriculture and serve as a highway supervisor for North Hempstead.
- Hendrick Onderdonk 1724-1809), was a "Founding Father” of the nearby village of Roslyn, owner of the first paper mill in New York, and host for George Washington on his LI tour in 1790.
- Henry Onderdonk Jr. (died 1886) was a prominent Long Island historian who wrote "Revolutionary Incidents of Queens County." among others,
- Phoebe Dodge (1768 –1828) was Quaker minister and one of the first on Long Island to free a slave.
- Elbert Hegeman (1741 - 1826) was one of the first school masters in Cow Neck and later a judge.

== See also ==
- Flower Hill Cemetery (Flower Hill, New York)
- Roslyn Cemetery
