= Sands Point Light =

- Location: Sands Point, Long Island, New York, United States
- Coordinates: 40°51′57.2″N 73°43′46.2″W

Tower
- Constructed: 1806
- Foundation: Brownstone
- Construction: Brownstone
- Automated: No
- Height: 65 feet (20 m)
- Shape: Octagonal
- Markings: Unpainted Masonry W/Faux Lantern

Light
- First lit: 1809
- Deactivated: 1922
- Lens: 11 lamps, 9-inch (230 mm) reflectors (original), fourth order, fresnel (current)

The Sands Point Lighthouse is a historic lighthouse located within the Incorporated Village of Sands Point in the Town of North Hempstead, in Nassau County, on the North Shore of Long Island, in New York, United States. The fourth lighthouse to be established on Long Island, this 1809 stone tower was built by an American Revolutionary War veteran who stayed on as its first keeper for many years. The Lighthouse is sometimes referred to the Mitchell Lighthouse, after Samuel L. Mitchell, the man who fought for it to be constructed.

== Construction ==
In 1806, New York State Governor Daniel D. Tompkins purchased 5 acres (2.0 ha) of land from Benjamin Hewlett to be used for the lighthouse. Revolutionary War veteran Noah Mason completed construction of the Lighthouse in 1809 and became the first keeper. The Lighthouse was 40 feet (12 m) high and octagonal in shape with four windows on the south side and had a four feet thick base and made of coursed brown stone. The lighting apparatus was eleven lamps and reflectors, arranged on two tables so that the fixed white light aimed at vessels transition between Long Island Sound and the East River. In 1856, a fifth-order Fresnel lens was installed, producing a flashing light every thirty seconds.

== Active years ==
In 1814, Mason again witnessed an act of British aggression. This time from the tower of the Lighthouse, during the War of 1812, Mason watched a naval battle between American gunboats and the British frigate Acosta. Mason remained the keeper until his death in 1841. The Masons had added to the original wood frame constructed keeper's house and according to an 1838 report, the house contained 23 rooms. In 1867 the United States Congress allocated funds to renovate the tower and replace the keeper's home stating the house was beyond repair. The tower was extensively renovated and the wooden spiral stairs and windows were replaced with cast-iron versions. The old dwelling was replaced with a new brick dwelling and the old lumber used to build a barn, shed and outhouse.

== Deactivation ==
No longer considered necessary, the Sands Point Lighthouse was deactivated on October 31, 1894. The Lighthouse was quickly reactivated in response to massive local opposition. In December 1922, the Lighthouse was officially deactivated and the light and lantern room were removed from the tower. The beacon was moved to an automated steel skeleton tower located offshore at the end of Sands Point. New York State Governor Alfred E. Smith tried to acquire the land to be used as a state park, but was unsuccessful, and in February 1924, socialite Alva Belmont purchased the property at auction for $100,000. Belmont had built a large mansion, Beacon Towers, in 1917 on the plot of land next to the lighthouse. In 1927, the property and lighthouse was again sold, this time to William Randolph Hearst for $400,000. The Hearsts lived in the keeper's house and used the mansion for guests. In 1940, he put the property up for sale, and after being unable to find a buyer, surrendered the property to a New York bank to satisfy the mortgage. Also unable to find a buyer for the property, the Bank began selling parts of the mansion and demolishing it. The property was later sold to a realtor who divided it into 1-acre (0.40 ha) lots and built the private residential development that stands there today.

== Landmark ==
The Lighthouse has remained in private ownership. On October 27, 1992, the Village of Sands Point and the Village of Sands Point Landmarks Commission designated the Lighthouse as a village landmark. Over the years, the Lighthouse has been damaged by erosion and by storms. A number of protection methods have also been built, destroyed and rebuilt. The original lighthouse and keeper's house remain in good shape and well preserved by its private owners. Currently, the only view of the lighthouse for visitors is from the water. Today, a skeletal light tower sitting off the Sands Point shore serves the same purpose as the original Lighthouse. On a clear day when approaching the light from the north, the New York City skyline can be seen.
