= Hempstead House =

Historic estate in Nassau County, New York, US

- Gould-Guggenheim Estate
- U.S. National Register of Historic Places
- U.S. Historic district
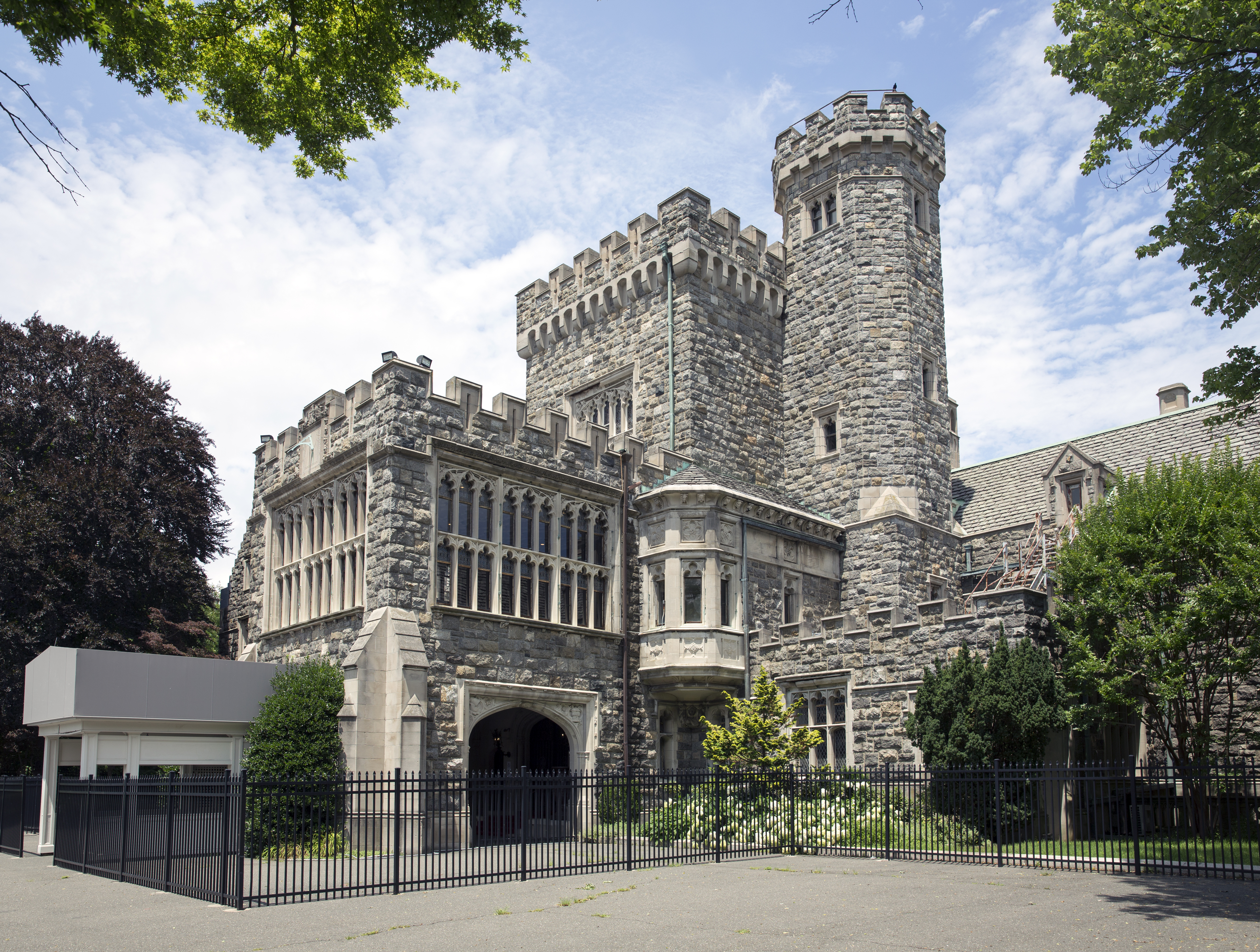
- Hempstead House

- Location within New York Location within the United States
- Location: 95 Middle Neck Rd, Port Washington, New York
- Coordinates: 40°51′34″N 73°41′47″W
- Area: 216 acres (87 ha)
- Built: 1909
- Architect: Allen, August et al.
- Architectural style: Late 19th and 20th Century Revivals
- NRHP reference No.: 06000881
- Added to NRHP: September 29, 2006

Hempstead House, also known as the Gould-Guggenheim Estate or Sands Point Preserve, is a large American estate that was built for Howard Gould and completed for Daniel Guggenheim in 1912. It is located in Sands Point on the North Shore of Long Island in Nassau County, New York.

== The estate ==
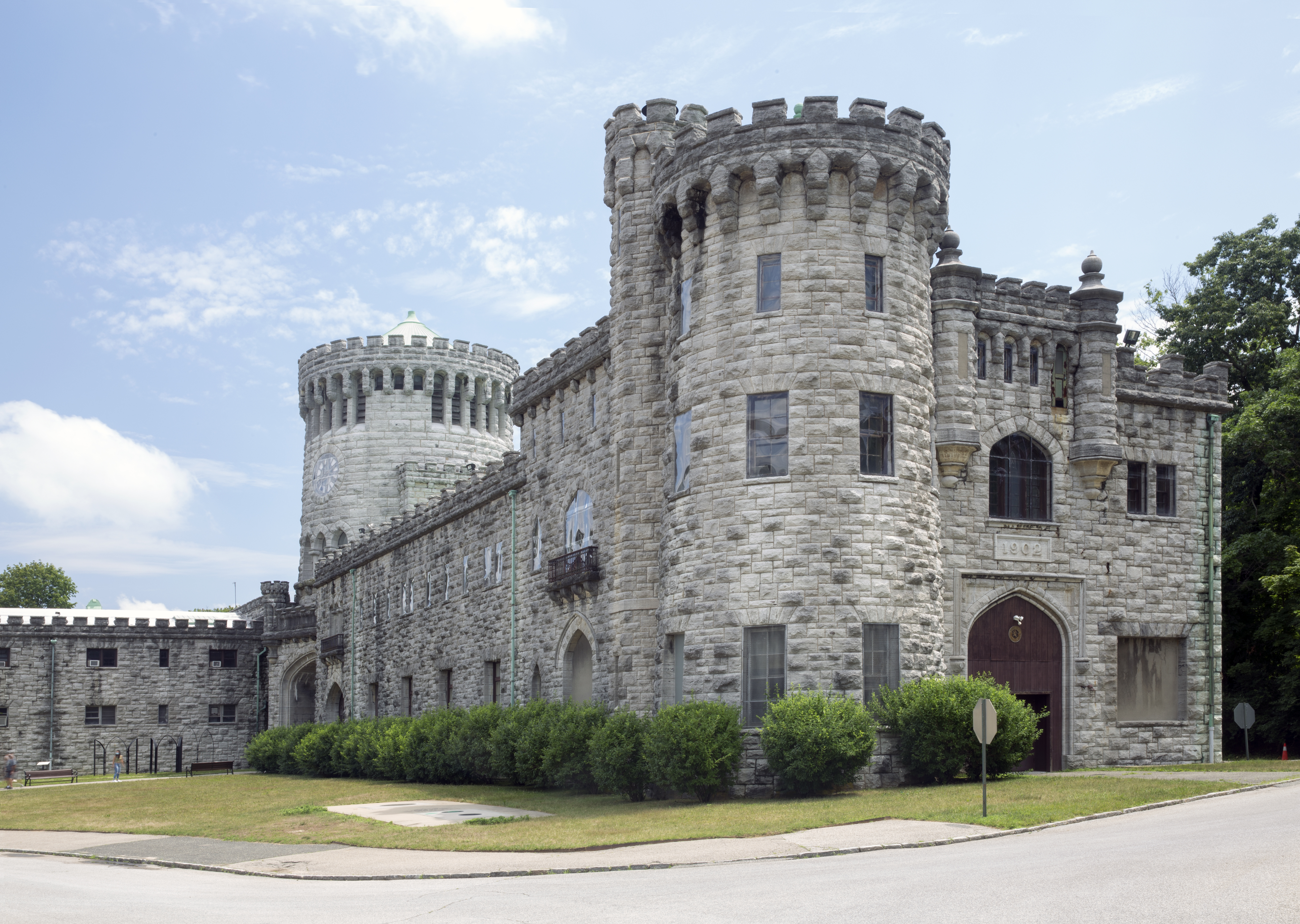
Castle Gould's western façade

The grounds contain two castle-like buildings; Hempstead House is the main house (approx 50,000 square feet [4,600 m^{2}]), and a larger house known as Castle Gould (approx 100,000 square feet [9,300 m^{2}]). The main house measures 225 ft (69 m) long, 135 ft (41 m) wide and has three floors containing 40 rooms, punctuated by an 80-foot (24 m) tower. Once construction had completed, the 300-acre (1.2 km^{2}) estate needed 17 house servants and 200 farmers and groundskeepers to maintain its upkeep. Hempstead House in its prime was regarded as one of the most lavish estates to occupy Long Island's Gold Coast:

In its heyday in the 1920s, Hempstead House revealed a taste for extravagance. In the Entry Foyer was an organ made of oak. The pipes still visible on the walls above were merely for show—the music reverberated through openings in the floors. Medieval tapestries once hung on the walls, and oriental carpets covered the floor. The sunken Palm Court once contained 150 species of rare orchids and other plants. An aviary housed exotic birds in ornate cages among the flowers. The walnut-paneled Library was copied from the palace of King James I; relief portraits of literary figures still decorate the plaster ceiling. The Billiard Room featured a gold leaf ceiling, hand-tooled leather wall covering, and carved oak woodwork from a 17th century Spanish palace.

== History ==
Howard Gould, son of railroad tycoon Jay Gould, began construction of the estate after purchasing the land in 1900. Initially, the plan was to build a castle that was to be a replica of Kilkenny Castle. Castle Gould, as it came to be called, was intended to be used as the main house. However, the Goulds did not like the castle, so they decided to create another house on the estate to serve as the main dwelling.

After the completion of the house in 1912, the Goulds sold the estate to Daniel Guggenheim in 1917. The name of the main house was changed to Hempstead House (the limestone stables and the servants' quarters are still called Castle Gould). In 1942, the Guggenheims donated the estate to the Institute of Aeronautical Sciences. Soon after acquiring the estate, the institute sold it to the U.S. Navy, which held it from 1946 to 1967. The U.S. government declared the estate as surplus and eventually gave the deed of the property to Nassau County, New York in 1971.

== Film ==
Scenes from a number of famous films have been filmed at Hempstead House and the surrounding estate, such as:

- Scent of a Woman (1992)
- Malcolm X (1992)
- Great Expectations (1998)

== See also ==
- List of largest houses in the United States
