= Sands Point, New York =

- Village
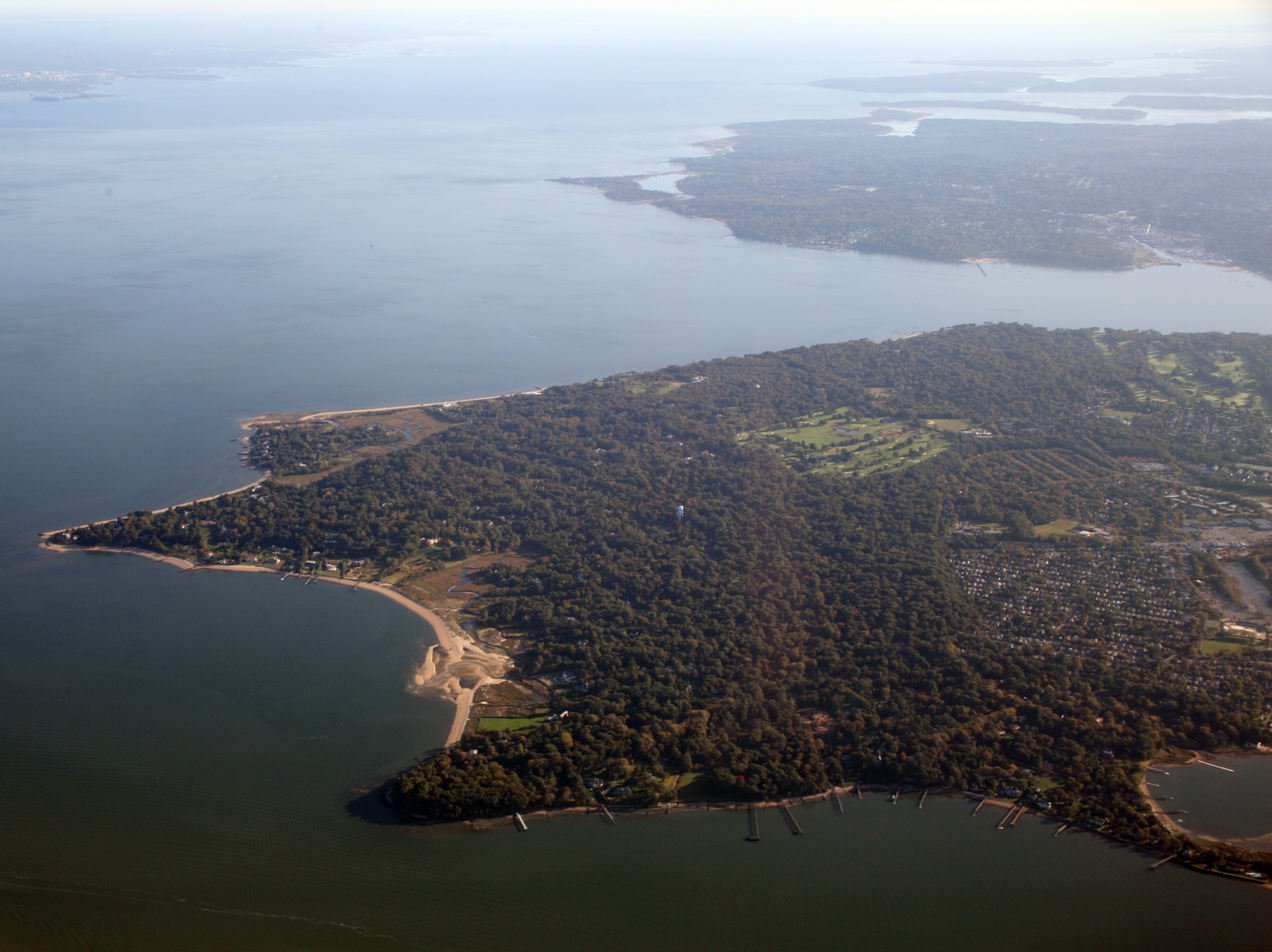
- Sands Point from the air in 2012, looking east

- Official emblem of Sands Point
- Nicknames: East Egg; The Three Points
- Location in Nassau County and the state of New York

- Location on Long Island Location within the state of New York
- Coordinates: 40°50′55″N 73°42′42″W
- Country: United States
- State: New York
- County: Nassau
- Town: North Hempstead
- Incorporated: 1910
- Named for: The Sands family

Government
  - Mayor: Peter A. Forman
  - Deputy Mayor: Elena Karabatos
  - Trustees: List of Trustees: • Sloane Ackerman; • Elena Karabatos; • Jeffrey Moslow; • David Schamis

Area
  - Total: 5.60 sq mi (14.50 km^{2})
  - Land: 4.22 sq mi (10.93 km^{2})
  - Water: 1.38 sq mi (3.57 km^{2})
- Elevation: 43 ft (13 m)

Population (2020)
  - Total: 2,712
  - Density: 642.7/sq mi (248.15/km^{2})
- Demonym(s): East Egger; Sands Pointer; Port Washingtonian
- Time zone: UTC−5 (Eastern (EST))
  - Summer (DST): UTC−4 (EDT)
- ZIP Code: 11050
- Area codes: 516, 363
- FIPS code: 36-65035
- GNIS feature ID: 0964415
- Website: www.sandspoint.gov

Sands Point is a village located at the tip of the Cow Neck Peninsula within the Town of North Hempstead, in Nassau County, on the North Shore of Long Island, in New York, United States. It is considered part of the Greater Port Washington area, which is anchored by Port Washington. The population was 2,712 at the time of the 2020 census.

== History ==
What is now the Village of Sands Point was originally inhabited by the Matinecock Native Americans. In 1644, the area was settled by European colonists – namely, Dutchmen and Englishmen, after they purchased the territory comprising Cow Neck and its vicinity from the Matinecocks. A number of these early settlers belonged to prominent, early Long Island families – including members of the Sands, Mott, and Cornwell families, among others.

The Village of Sands Point – much like the eponymous cape at the tip of the village – is named for the Sands family. This family had long resided on Cow Neck, having arrived during colonial times. The family owned a considerable amount of property in the modern-day village.

The Village of Sands Point was incorporated in 1910, comprising land primarily belonging to three families: the Cornwell family, the Sands family, and the Vanderbilt family. In 1912, the village absorbed the adjacent, incorporated villages of Barker's Point and Mott's Point – both of which had incorporated at the same time as Sands Point; residents of the three incorporated villages approved of the consolidation proposal on July 23 of that year, with the newly-consolidated village retaining the Sands Point name.

In 1917, Daniel Guggenheim bought his 216-acre (0.87 km^{2}) Hempstead House, formerly Castle Gould. His son Harry Guggenheim, founder of Newsday, later erected his estate "Falaise" nearby in 1923. Today, the estate belongs to the Friends of the Sands Point Preserve – a non-profit organization that maintains the property; the mansion is the main attraction within the Nassau County-owned park and preserve.

In 1918, lawyer George E. Reynolds opened the short-lived Harbor Hill Country Club, which was then purchased in 1921 by businessman and politician Julius Fleischmann, who opened a polo field on the property. In 1927, the Sands Point Club opened on the property; the Sands Point Club operated until 1938, when financial difficulties forced it to close. Two years later, in 1940, the property became the present Sands Point Golf Club.

In 1932, the village annexed the community known as Harbor Acres – located between the rest of Sands Point and the Beacon Hill neighborhood of unincorporated Port Washington – after the residents of that area requested to split from unincorporated Port Washington and become part of Sands Point. This annexation was approved unanimously by the Town of North Hempstead that May.

In 1954, a Reform Jewish congregation proposed permanently opening a synagogue in The Chimneys – a historic mansion located within Sands Point, with the village soon thereafter denying the application; the congregation appealed the denial to the village's zoning appeals board. On September 8, 1955, after two years of debate the two parties, the Village of Sands Point Board of Zoning Appeals denied the congregation's appeal – a decision vocally criticized by village resident and then New York Governor W. Averell Harriman, who referred to the decision as "arbitrary." On August 29, 1955 – a few days prior to the decision to deny the appeal, village trustee William I. Stoddard proposed acquiring portions of Harriman's Sands Point property for the purposes of erecting a village hall and municipal park thereupon. When village officials asked Harriman as to whether he would be interesting in offering a portion of his property to the village for such purposes, Harriman responded on September 8 – in the same communication expressing his disapproval of the village denying the synagogue's appeal – by offering as much land as the village needed, under the one condition that the synagogue plans be approved. Village officials agreed to Harriman's deal; the synagogue was approved, and the Harriman allowed the village to acquire the land it desired. This synagogue, as of 2026, continues to operate as The Community Synagogue of Port Washington.

In 1957, Sands Point Village Hall opened. Designed by Port Washington-based architect Henry T. Aspinwall, this municipal building on Tibbits Lane would be erected at a cost of $60,000 (1957 USD) and allow the village government to have its own, purpose-built facility, after roughly 20 years of sharing the same space as the Sands Point Water Department, in one of that department's pump houses. The new village hall – which had been designed to consolidate the village's government and its various departments under one roof – would also include dedicated space for the new, relocated offices of the Sands Point Police Department, which at the time had been operating out of a leased farmhouse on Lighthouse Road. The groundbreaking ceremony was held in January 1957, and the building opened that October. Tibbits Lane was also extended as part of the project, from its existing dead-end at the Village Hall property south to its present terminus at Sands Point Road. The Port Washington-based firm Pollock & Wysong served as the general contractor for the project.

In 1958, the Village of Sands Point opened its roughly 85-acre (34 ha) nature preserve touching Hempstead Harbor in the vicinity of East Creek and Prospect Point, with portions of the preserve being leased by the village from resident and park commissioner Norman E. Blankman, as well as approximately 20–25 acres (8.1–10.1 ha) of property owned outright by the village. The opening ceremony was attended by Sands Point resident and then-New York Governor W. Averill Harriman.

In the 1960s, as Long Island was undergoing rapid suburbanization – and when Sands Point had less strict building codes, many homes were built on one-acre (4,000 m^{2}) parcels. In response to the impacts of increased development in the community and to preserve the village's resources and character, the zoning ordinances within Sands Point were later modified to allow subdivisions of two acres (8,100 m^{2}) or more.

The 1960s also saw the construction of the Port Washington Union Free School District's Florence and Daniel Guggenheim Elementary School at the southern edge of the Village of Sands Point, adjacent to the Port Washington Terrace neighborhood of unincorporated Port Washington. The school, built on a 17.2-acre (7.0 ha) parcel of land donated to the school district by the Daniel and Florence Guggenheim Foundation, was designed by Eggers & Higgins and opened in September 1962.

In 1967, the village – along with several others within the Greater Port Washington area – joined the Port Washington Parking District.

The Sands Family Cemetery was added to the National Register of Historic Places in 1992. The village designated the Sands Point Light a local landmark that same year.

In 1994, the Village of Sands Point acquired the 208-acre (84 ha) IBM Country Club from the IBM Corporation, located off Middle Neck Road on the former estate of Isaac and Solomon R. Guggenheim. The village subsequently converted the property into a municipal golf and country club and recreational facility, known as the Village Club of Sands Point.

== Geography ==
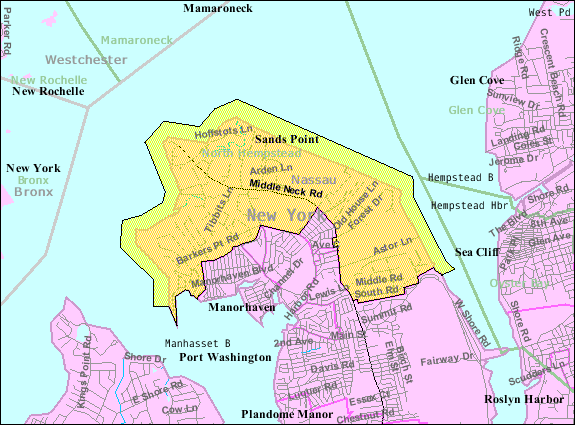
U.S. census map of Sands Point

According to the United States Census Bureau, the village has a total area of 5.6 square miles (15 km^{2}), of which 4.2 square miles (11 km^{2}) is land and 1.4 square miles (3.6 km^{2}), or 24.56%, is water.

Sands Point is located at the tip of the Cow Neck Peninsula (also known as the Port Washington Peninsula or as Manhasset Neck), which is bordered by Manhasset Bay, Hempstead Bay, and the Long Island Sound. This area of the peninsula is historically known as "The Three Points," due to the presence of three named capes: Sands Point, Mott's Point, and Barker's Point – all presently located within the Village of Sands Point. A fourth, smaller cape – Prospect Point – is also located within the village.

Sands Point is situated on a terminal moraine, known as the Harbor Hill Moraine. This moraine was formed by glaciers during the Wisconsin Glacial Episode, and is named for Harbor Hill in Roslyn; Harbor Hill is the highest geographic point in Nassau County.

=== Climate ===
Sands Point has a humid subtropical climate (Cfa), bordering on a hot-summer humid continental climate (Dfa). Average monthly temperatures in the village range from 31.8 °F in January to 75.3 °F in July.

Climate data for Sands Point, New York, 1991–2020 normals, extremes 1999–present
| Month | Jan | Feb | Mar | Apr | May | Jun | Jul | Aug | Sep | Oct | Nov | Dec | Year |
|---|---|---|---|---|---|---|---|---|---|---|---|---|---|
| Record high °F (°C) | 71 (22) | 73 (23) | 87 (31) | 94 (34) | 96 (36) | 101 (38) | 108 (42) | 105 (41) | 97 (36) | 89 (32) | 83 (28) | 76 (24) | 108 (42) |
| Mean daily maximum °F (°C) | 39.8 (4.3) | 41.9 (5.5) | 48.7 (9.3) | 59.7 (15.4) | 69.4 (20.8) | 78.6 (25.9) | 84.0 (28.9) | 82.6 (28.1) | 76.4 (24.7) | 65.2 (18.4) | 54.5 (12.5) | 45.0 (7.2) | 62.2 (16.7) |
| Daily mean °F (°C) | 33.0 (0.6) | 34.5 (1.4) | 41.0 (5.0) | 51.2 (10.7) | 60.8 (16.0) | 70.2 (21.2) | 75.9 (24.4) | 74.8 (23.8) | 68.3 (20.2) | 57.3 (14.1) | 47.1 (8.4) | 38.6 (3.7) | 54.4 (12.5) |
| Mean daily minimum °F (°C) | 26.1 (−3.3) | 27.1 (−2.7) | 33.2 (0.7) | 42.6 (5.9) | 52.2 (11.2) | 61.8 (16.6) | 67.8 (19.9) | 66.9 (19.4) | 60.3 (15.7) | 49.5 (9.7) | 39.8 (4.3) | 32.1 (0.1) | 46.6 (8.1) |
| Record low °F (°C) | −4 (−20) | −5 (−21) | 5 (−15) | 13 (−11) | 34 (1) | 43 (6) | 50 (10) | 46 (8) | 38 (3) | 27 (−3) | 18 (−8) | −2 (−19) | −5 (−21) |
| Average precipitation inches (mm) | 3.86 (98) | 3.06 (78) | 4.30 (109) | 4.02 (102) | 3.75 (95) | 4.31 (109) | 4.06 (103) | 4.33 (110) | 4.22 (107) | 4.20 (107) | 3.42 (87) | 4.31 (109) | 47.84 (1,214) |
| Average snowfall inches (cm) | 1.85 (4.7) | 2.13 (5.4) | 2.32 (5.9) | 0.08 (0.20) | 0 (0) | 0 (0) | 0 (0) | 0 (0) | 0 (0) | 0 (0) | 0.16 (0.41) | 1.69 (4.3) | 8.23 (20.91) |
| Average relative humidity (%) | 73 | 75 | 72 | 71 | 75 | 74 | 73 | 70 | 73 | 74 | 72 | 75 | 73 |
| Average dew point °F (°C) | 22.0 (−5.6) | 22.3 (−5.4) | 27.3 (−2.6) | 37.0 (2.8) | 48.2 (9.0) | 58.9 (14.9) | 64.4 (18.0) | 64.2 (17.9) | 58.1 (14.5) | 47.2 (8.4) | 36.5 (2.5) | 27.9 (−2.3) | 42.8 (6.0) |
| Mean monthly sunshine hours | 177 | 153 | 172 | 167 | 202 | 213 | 237 | 241 | 215 | 190 | 210 | 171 | 2,348 |
| Mean daily daylight hours | 9.6 | 10.7 | 12.0 | 13.3 | 14.5 | 15.1 | 14.8 | 13.7 | 12.4 | 11.1 | 9.9 | 9.3 | 12.2 |
| Average ultraviolet index | 2 | 2 | 2 | 4 | 5 | 6 | 6 | 6 | 5 | 3 | 2 | 2 | 4 |
Source 1: NOAA, PRISM, The Weather Channel (temperatures, average dew points, and average precipitation)
Source 2: Weather Atlas (all other data)

== Demographics ==
Historical population
| Census | Pop. | Note | %± |
|---|---|---|---|
| 1920 | 284 | | — |
| 1930 | 438 | | 54.2% |
| 1940 | 628 | | 43.4% |
| 1950 | 860 | | 36.9% |
| 1960 | 2,161 | | 151.3% |
| 1970 | 2,916 | | 34.9% |
| 1980 | 2,742 | | −6.0% |
| 1990 | 2,477 | | −9.7% |
| 2000 | 2,786 | | 12.5% |
| 2010 | 2,675 | | −4.0% |
| 2020 | 2,712 | | 1.4% |
U.S. Decennial Census

As of the census of 2010, 2,675 people, 872 households, and 762 families were residing in the village. The population density was 636.9 people/sq mi (243.2/km^{2}). The 934 housing units had an average density of 222.4/sq mi (84.9/km^{2}). The racial makeup of the village was 88.6% White, 0.8% African American, 8.2% Asian, 1.1% from other races, and 1.3% from two or more races. Hispanics or Latinos of any race were 4.7% of the population.

Of the 872 households, 38.3% had children under 18 living with them, 80.6% were married couples living together, 4.1% had a female householder with no husband present, and 12.6% were not families. About 10.4% of the households were made up of individuals, and 7.1% had someone living alone who was 65 years of age or older. The average household size was 3.03, and the average family size was 3.21.

In the village, the age distribution was 26.4% under 18, 5.6% from 18 to 24, 15.4% from 25 to 44, 34.0% from 45 to 64, and 18.7% who were 65 or older. The median age was 45.4 years. For every 100 females, there were 95.7 males. For every 100 females age 18 and over, there were 95.4 males.

As of 2018, the median income for a household in the village was $231,667, with it being named the richest town in New York. Males had a median income of $158,500 versus $44,943 for females. The per capita income for the village was $112,716. None of the families and 0.5% of the population were below the poverty line, including none under age 18 or 65 or over.

== Economy ==
Sands Point is a bedroom community of New York City, and many residents commute to New York City for work.

Sands Point is residential in character, and there are no areas zoned for business, commercial, or industrial uses anywhere within the village. There are multiple houses of worship within Sands Point, and the Helen Keller National Center for Deaf-Blind Youths and Adults is headquartered within the village.

== Parks and recreation ==
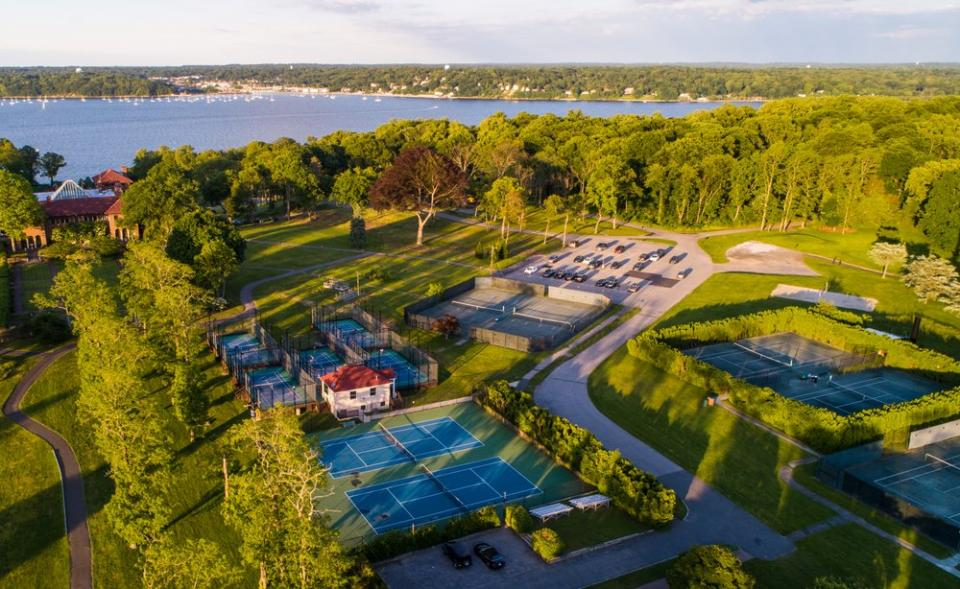
The Village Club of Sands Point in 2024

The Sands Point Golf Club and the Village Club of Sands Point are both located in Sands Point. The Village Club – which was formerly the IBM Country Club – was purchased in 1994 by the village.

Sands Point operates a municipal nature preserve, which opened in 1958.

Nassau County's Sands Point Preserve is located within the village.

== Government ==
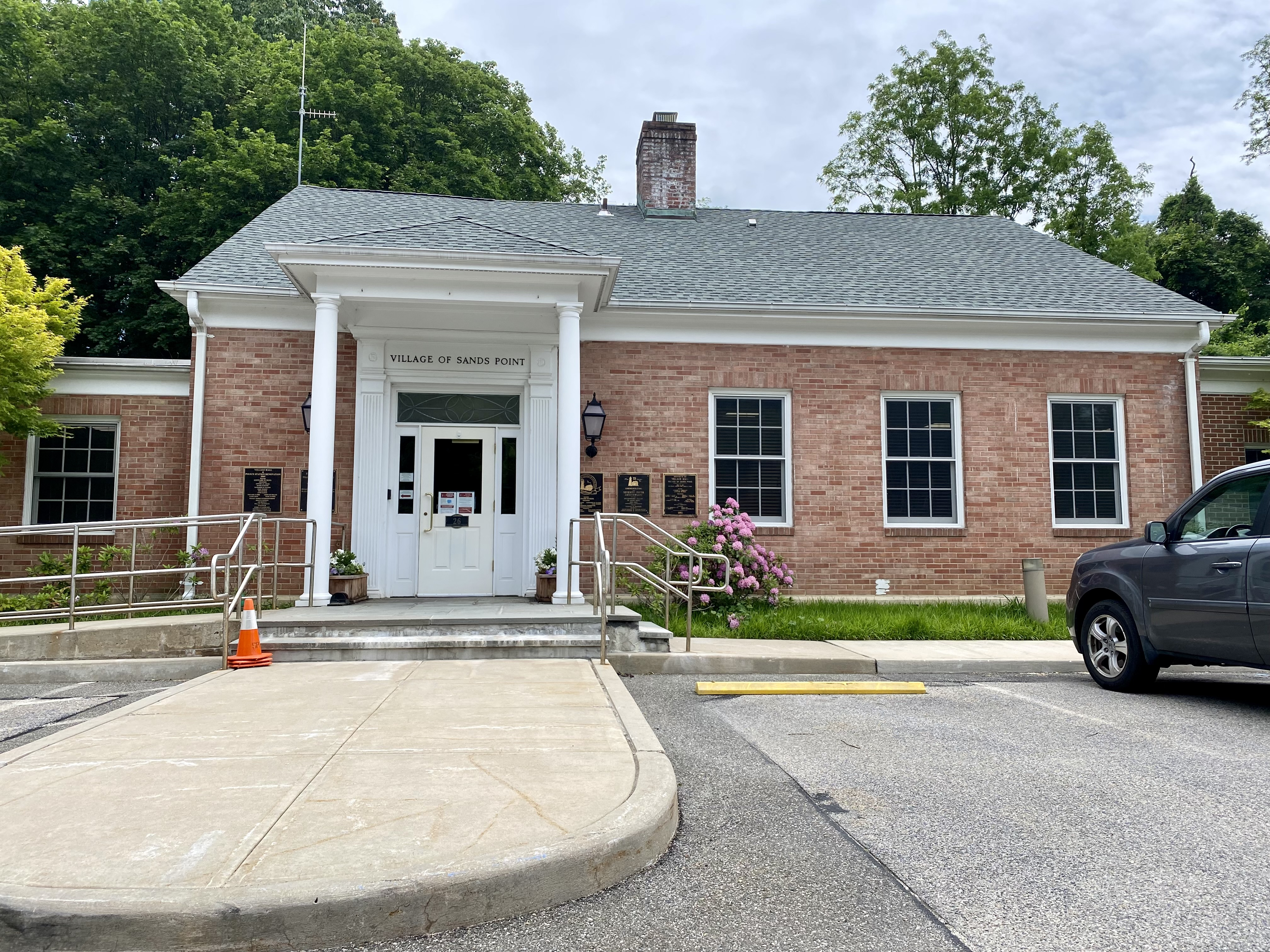
Sands Point Village Hall in 2021

=== Village government ===
The Village of Sands Point is governed by the five-member Village of Sands Point Board of Trustees, which consists of a mayor and four village trustees, with one trustee serving as deputy mayor. The mayor and trustees are elected at-large every two years by residents.

As of May 2026, the mayor of Sands Point is Peter A. Forman.

=== Representation in higher government ===
In the Town of North Hempstead's 6th council district, as of May 2026, Sands Point is represented on the North Hempstead Town Council by Mariann Dalimonte (D–Port Washington).

In Nassau County's 11th Legislative district, as of May 2026, Sands Point is represented in the Nassau County Legislature by Delia DiRiggi-Whitton (D–Glen Cove).

In the New York State Assembly's 16th State Assembly district, as of May 2026, Sands Point is represented by Daniel J. Norber (R–Great Neck).

In the New York State Senate's 7th State Senate district, as of May 2026, Sands Point is represented by Jack M. Martins (R–Old Westbury).

In New York's 3rd congressional district, as of May 2026, Sands Point is represented by Thomas R. Suozzi (D–Glen Cove).

Sands Point is represented in the United States Senate by Charles E. Schumer (D) and Kirsten E. Gillibrand (D).

=== Politics ===
In the 2024 U.S. presidential election, the majority of Sands Point voters voted for Kamala D. Harris (D).

== Education ==
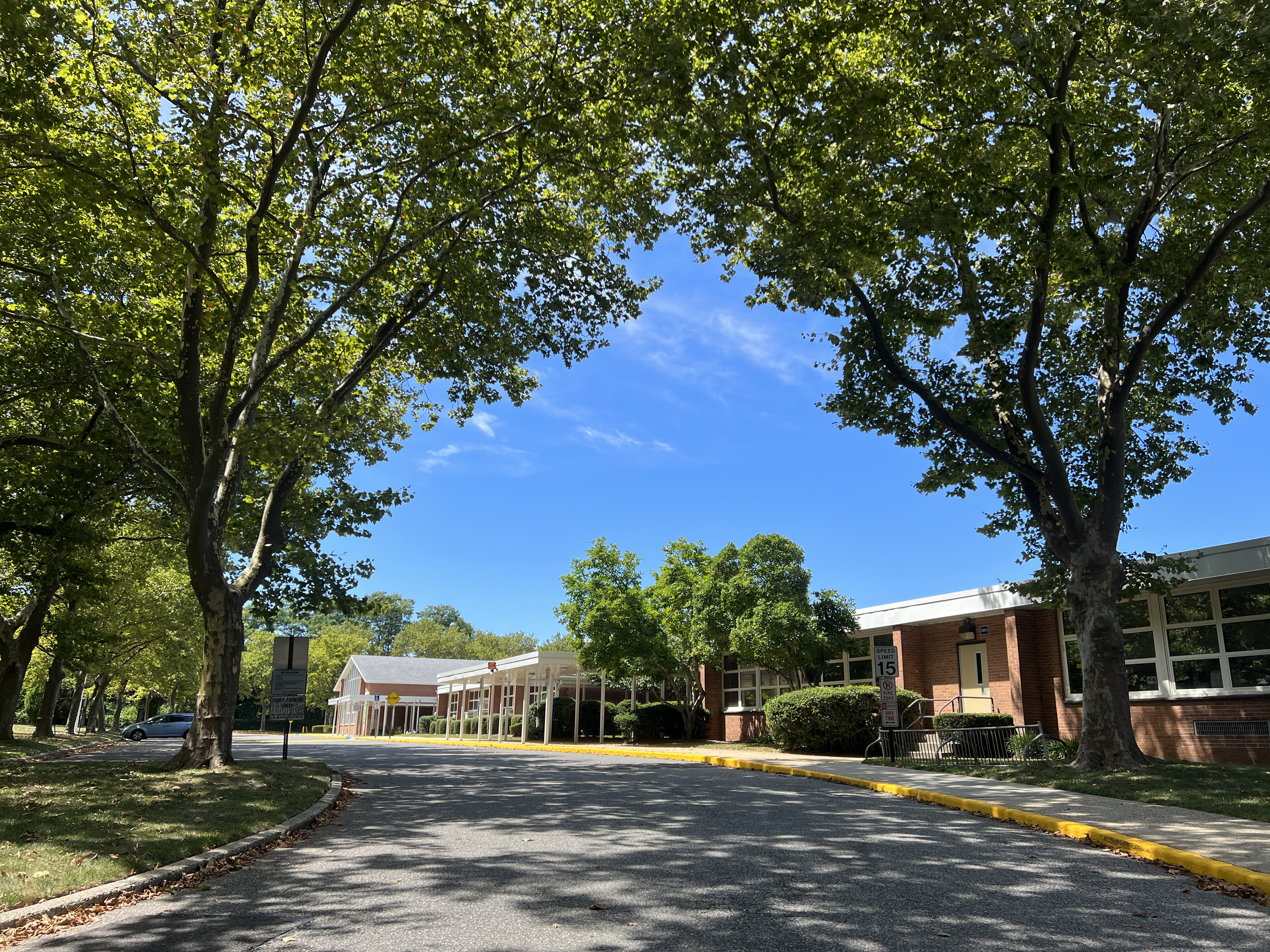
Guggenheim Elementary School in 2022

Public education is administered by the Port Washington Union Free School District.

The Port Washington UFSD's Guggenheim Elementary School is located within the village.

== Infrastructure ==
=== Transportation ===
==== Road ====
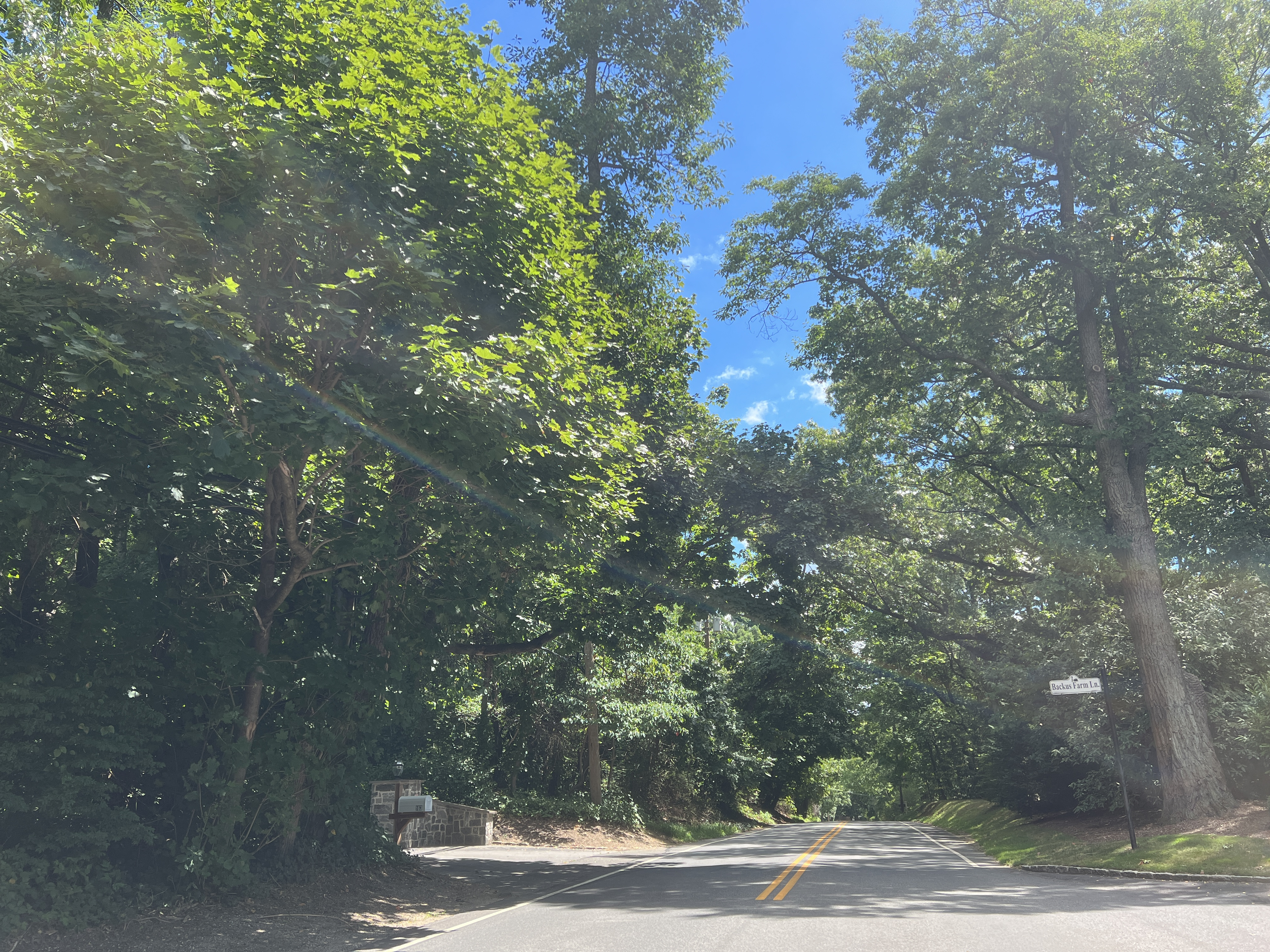
Middle Neck Road within Sands Point

Major roads within Sands Point include:

- Port Washington Boulevard (NY 101).
- Cow Neck Road (CR C53)
- Middle Neck Road (CR D55)

Sands Point is additionally located within the Port Washington Parking District's boundaries, allowing village residents to park their vehicles in the commuter parking lots at the nearby Port Washington Long Island Rail Road station.

=== Utilities ===
- Natural gas within Sands Point is provided by National Grid USA.
- Electricity within Sands Point is provided by PSEG Long Island, on behalf of the Long Island Power Authority.
- Sewage treatment within Sands Point is dependant on cesspools and septic systems.
- Water within the village is supplied by the Sands Point Water Department.

=== Emergency services ===
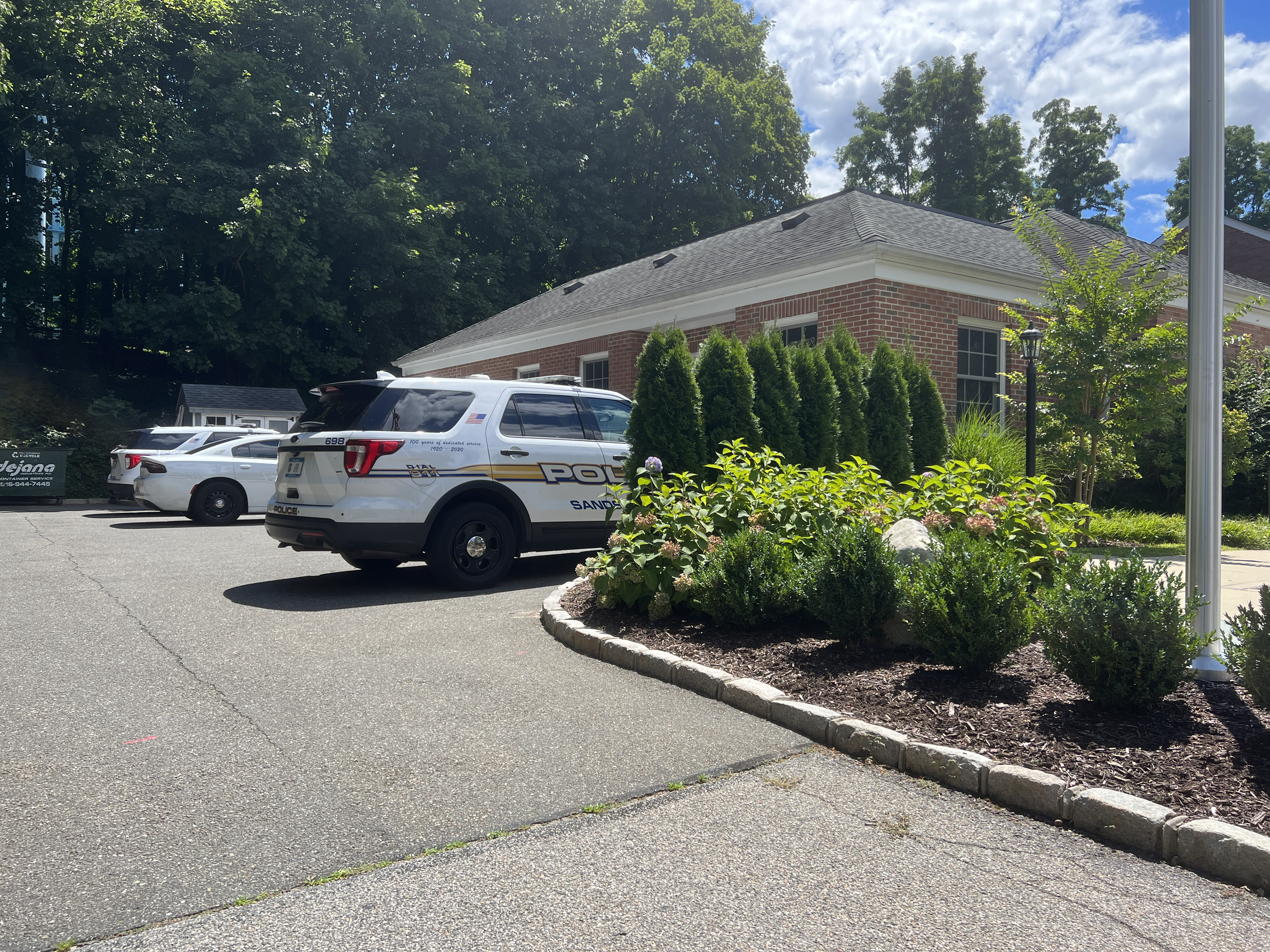
Sands Point Police Department patrol car at Village Hall

Sands Point is served by the Port Washington Fire District.

Law enforcement is provided by the Sands Point Police Department.

== Landmarks ==
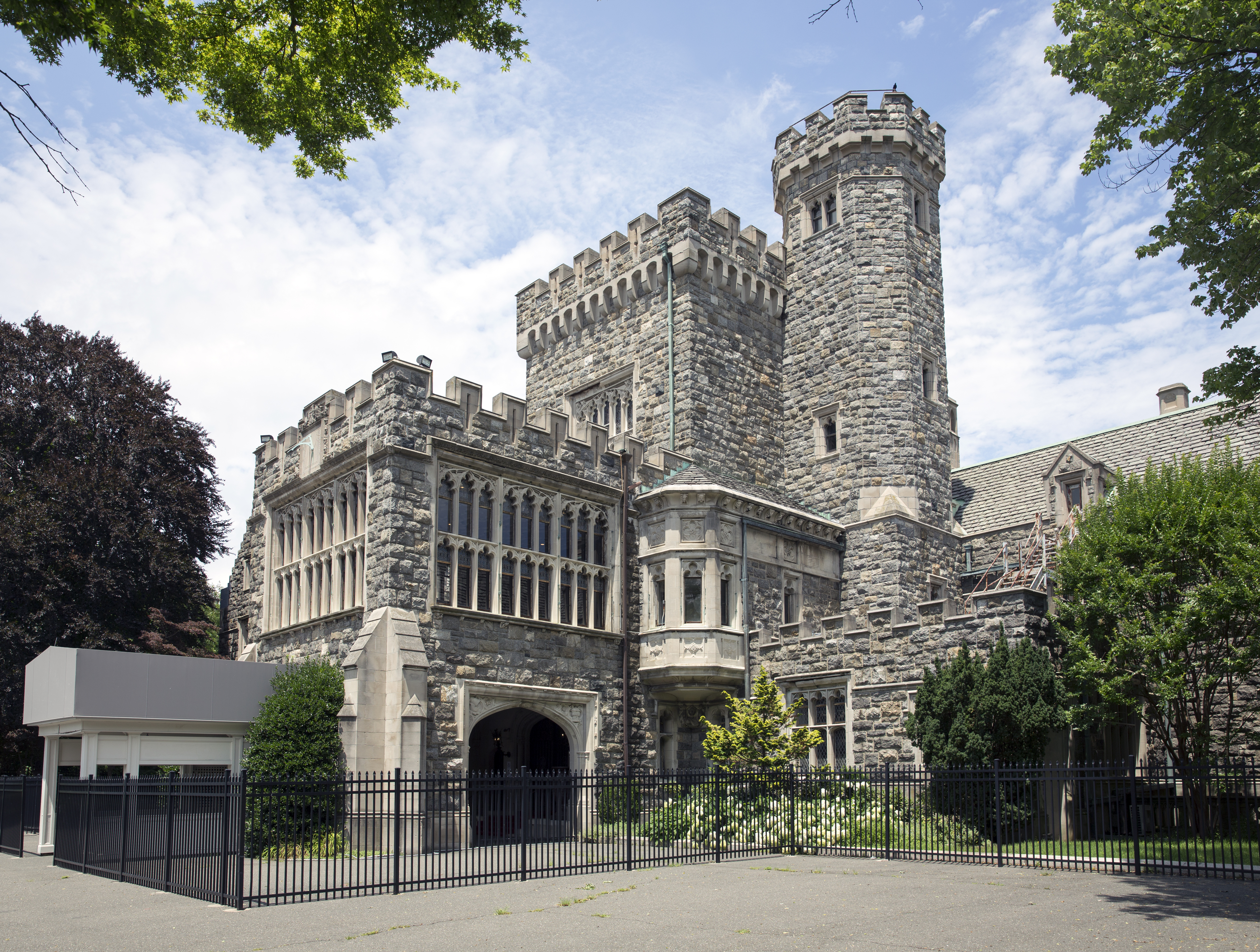
The Hempstead House in 2020

Designated landmarks within Sands Point include Falaise, the Hempstead House, the John Philip Sousa House National Historic Landmark, the Sands Family Cemetery, and the Sands Point Light.

== Notable people ==
- Marv Albert (born 1941), sportscaster.
- Alva Belmont (1853–1933), socialite and suffragette.
- Carlos Beltrán (born 1977), professional baseball player.
- Len Berman (born 1947), television sportscaster and morning radio host.
- John Cassavetes (1929–1989), actor and film director; graduated from Port Washington High School in 1947.
- Stanley Chais (1926–2010), investment advisor in the Madoff investment scandal.
- Perry Como (1912–2001), singer.
- Frank Costello (1891–1973), mobster, crime boss, and racketeer.
- Howard Gould (1871–1959), financier.
- Harry Guggenheim (1890–1971), aviator, newspaper publisher, and racehorse owner/breeder.
- Horace Hagedorn (1915–2005), businessman.
- W. Averell Harriman (1891–1986), Governor of New York.
- Pamela Harriman (1920–1997), socialite and W. Averell Harriman's third wife.
- William Randolph Hearst (1863–1951), publisher.
- John La Gatta (1894–1977), illustrator.
- Kenneth C. Langone (born 1935), co-founder (financial backer) of Home Depot.
- Edgar F. Luckenbach (1868–1943), shipping magnate.
- Condé Montrose Nast (1873–1942), publisher.
- Elizabeth Cushman Titus Putnam (born 1933), founder of the Student Conservation Association
- Charles Cary Rumsey (1879–1922), sculptor, husband of Mary Harriman Rumsey.
- Mary Harriman Rumsey, (1881–1934), founder of The Junior League, member National Women's Hall of Fame.
- Arnold A. Saltzman (1916–2014), businessman, diplomat, art collector, and philanthropist.
- James R. Shepley (1917–1988), reporter and publishing executive.
- Felix Sater (born 1966), real-estate developer and career criminal.
- John Philip Sousa (1854–1932), composer most famous for his marches; his Sands Point residence is a National Historic Landmark.
- Herbert Bayard Swope (1882–1958), editor and journalist.
- William Tavoulareas (1919–1996), president of the Mobil Oil Company.
- Don Vultaggio (born 1951/1952), founder of the Arizona Beverage Company.

== In popular culture ==
In F. Scott Fitzgerald's The Great Gatsby (1925), Sands Point (Port Washington/Manhasset/Cow Neck) was referred to as "East Egg". East Egg (Port Washington/Manhasset/Cow Neck) residents inherited their fortunes and were more highly respected than the nouveau riche in newer "West Egg" (Great Neck/Kings Point), because Sands Point had "old money." The story's fictional Buchanans lived in the western part of Sands Point. Reports incorrectly suggest that Fitzgerald – while he was a guest at the mansion of Herbert Bayard Swope on Hoffstot Lane, at Prospect Point in Sands Point – used the site and its parties as his inspiration for the fictional Buchanan home in East Egg. The home may have served as one of the many inspirations, as Fitzgerald did likely visit it during his time living in Great Neck (1922–24), but not as a guest of Swope's. Fitzgerald left Great Neck for Paris in 1924, prior to Swope's purchase of that mansion. The likely story with regard to Swope is that Fitzgerald and his good friend Ring Lardner would observe many parties held at the home Swope was residing in during the time Fitzgerald was actually living in the area. This Swope residence was adjacent to Lardner's home on Shore Road in Great Neck, and is no longer extant, though Lardner's mansion is still standing.

Another Sands Point mansion, situated next to the Sands Point Light and across a shallow bay from Prospect Point, was Beacon Towers. Scholars believe it served as one of the many inspirations for Jay Gatsby's mansion in the novel, though Gatsby lived on the eastern side of Kings Point, in the book. The extravagant Gothic-style residence was built by Alva Belmont, formerly Alva Vanderbilt, in 1918. It was demolished in 1945.

== See also ==
- List of municipalities in New York
- Kings Point, New York – The inspiration for "West Egg" – across the water from "East Egg" (Sands Point) in The Great Gatsby.
