= Harry Tappen Pool, Beach and Marina =

Park in Glenwood Landing, Long Island

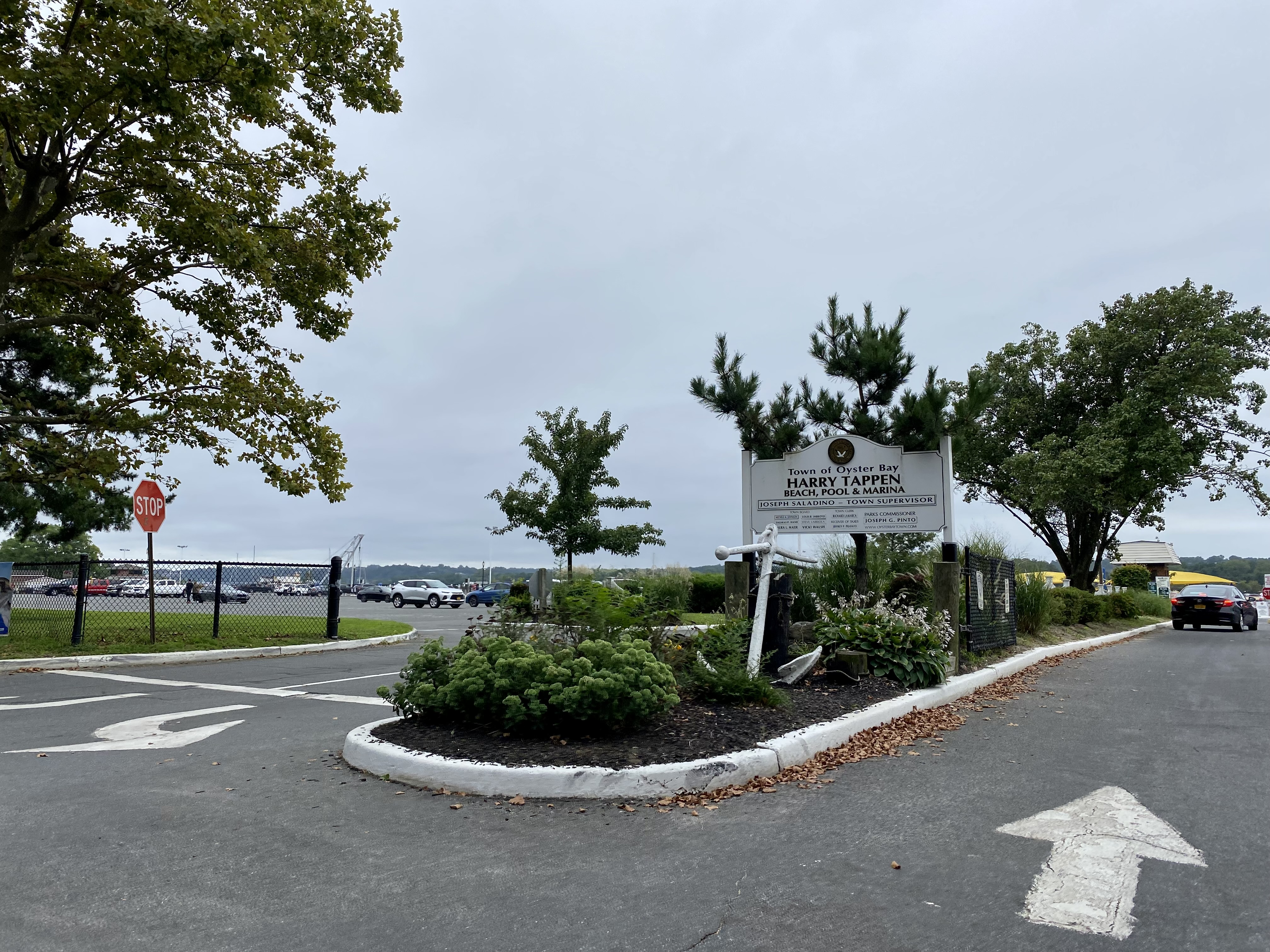
- The entrance to Tappen Beach in 2021
- Interactive map of Harry Tappen Pool, Beach and Marina
- Type: Public
- Location: Glenwood Landing, New York, United States
- Coordinates: 40°50′07″N 73°39′02″W
- Owner: Town of Oyster Bay
- Operator: Town of Oyster Bay
- Website: oysterbaytown.com/tappen/

Harry Tappen Pool, Beach and Marina (also known as East Beach and more commonly as Tappen Beach) is a town-owned park in Glenwood Landing, in Nassau County, on Long Island, in New York, United States. It is owned and operated by the Town of Oyster Bay.

== Description ==
Tappen Beach is located along the eastern shore of Hempstead Harbor. It is also known as East Beach. Amenities at Tappen Beach include the beach, a marina, playground facilities, and a saltwater pool for Oyster Bay residents.

== History ==
In 1977, the pool at Tappen Beach – which had been operating for roughly 50 years at the time – was shut down after being deemed unsafe by inspectors. It was replaced at a cost of roughly $731,000 (1983 USD). While the park was historically only accessible to residents of the town of Oyster Bay, the pool renovations were funded in part by federal dollars from the National Park Service, and federal laws required that the town open the park to the rest of the general public.

== See also ==
- North Hempstead Beach Park
- Tobay Beach
