= Sheets Creek =

Coordinates: 40°50′27″N 73°42′32″W

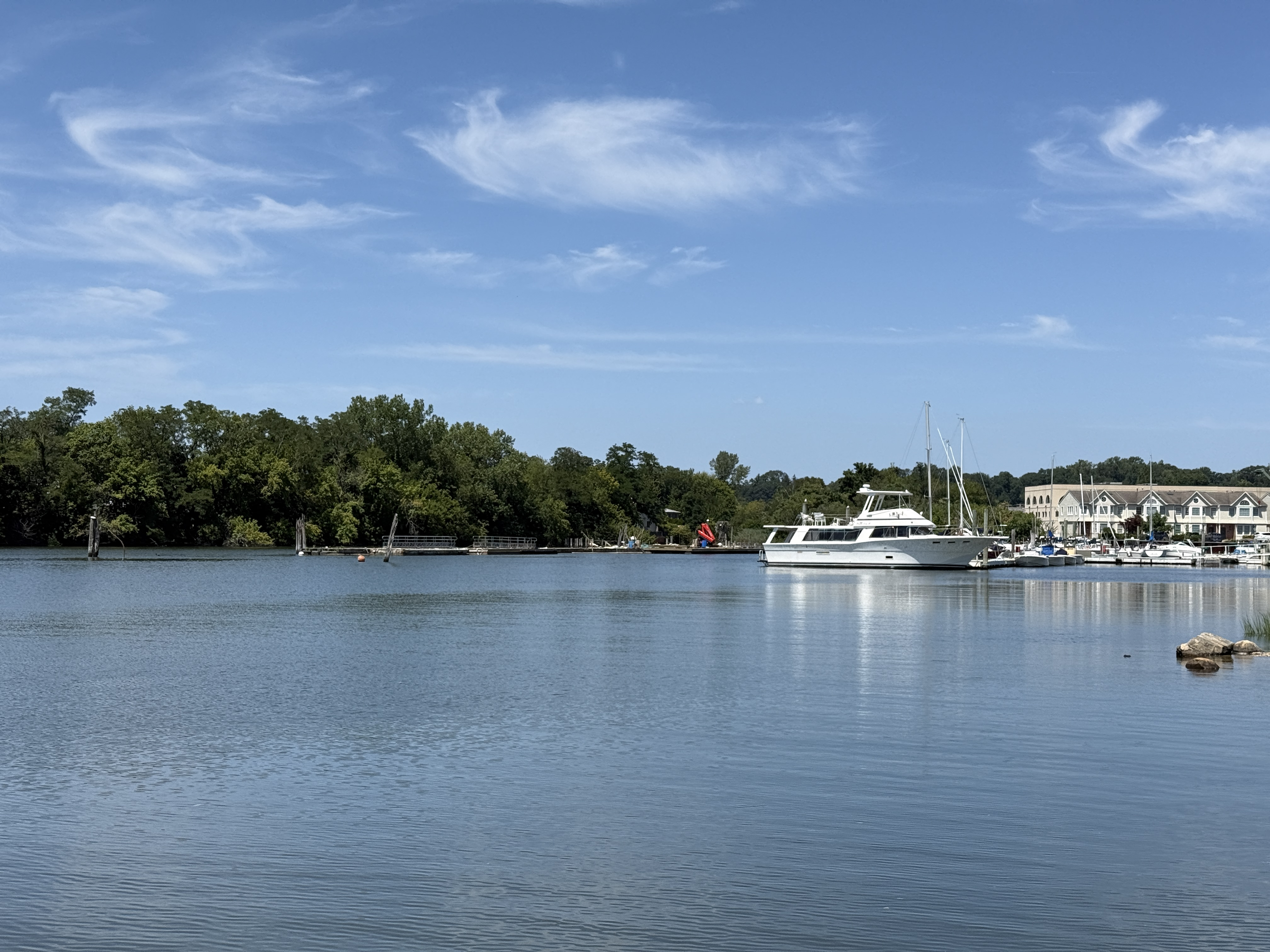
- Sheets Creek in 2025

Location
- Country: United States
- State: New York
- County: Nassau
- Municipality: Manorhaven; Port Washington North

Physical characteristics
- Mouth: Manhasset Bay

Sheets Creek – also known as Sheets Creek Channel, North Sheets Creek, and Sheets Creek East – is a channel and tidal marsh in the villages of Manorhaven and Port Washington North, located within the Town of North Hempstead in Nassau County, New York, United States.

== Description ==
Sheets Creek flows into Manhasset Bay. It historically separated Manhasset Isle – located within Manorhaven – from Cow Neck on Long Island, before the gap was filled through land reclamation and culverting. This resulted in the waterway being split in two, with both ends still flowing into the bay.

The submerged lands at the bottom of Sheets Creek are owned by the Town of North Hempstead.

== History ==
In the 1960s, the Town of North Hempstead dredged portions of Sheets Creek Channel and Manhasset Bay when it expanded Manorhaven Beach Park. The sand dredged – roughly 200,000 cubic yards – was used for the reclaimed land constructed as part of the park's expansion.

In the 1970s, disputes arose between the Town of North Hempstead and private landowners and developers, over developments along the waterfront as well as who had ownership over reclaimed lands within the village that were once submerged beneath the creek or were previously part of the wetlands separating Manhasset Isle from Long Island, among other things. The New York Supreme Court ultimately mediated the disputes – in part referring to colonial charters.

By the 1990s, Sheets Creek and its wetlands had become severely polluted from industry, chronic dumping of rubbish and waste, and neglect, sparking concerns from Manorhaven's residents and village officials – along with numerous environmentalists and state and federal officials. This prompted a significant environmental clean-up and restoration effort spearheaded by the local municipalities – including Manorhaven and North Hempstead – with support from the New York State Department of Environmental Conservation and the United States Environmental protection Agency. The plan further called for the two portions of the creek to be reconnected via a culvert beneath Manhasset Avenue, in order to improve tidal flow and water quality. These clean-up efforts also spurred the Village of Manorhaven's decision to purchase a large amount of land along the northern section of Sheets Creek from the Town of North Hempstead and transform it into a public, village-owned park and nature preserve; this park – approximately 12 acres (4.9 ha) in area – is known as the Manorhaven Preserve. The west side of the creek also saw the removal of abandoned pilings and barges, with another park – featuring a marina – being constructed in their place; this roughly 1.5-acre (0.61 ha), village-owned park at the former site of the Morgan's Ferry Dock is known as Morgan's Dock Park.

=== Etymology ===
It is speculated that Sheets Creek is named for the Sheets family – a prominent family which historically lived in the Greater Port Washington area.

== See also ==
- Glen Cove Creek
- Rivers of New York (state)
