= Manorhaven Beach Park =

Park in Manorhaven, New York, United States

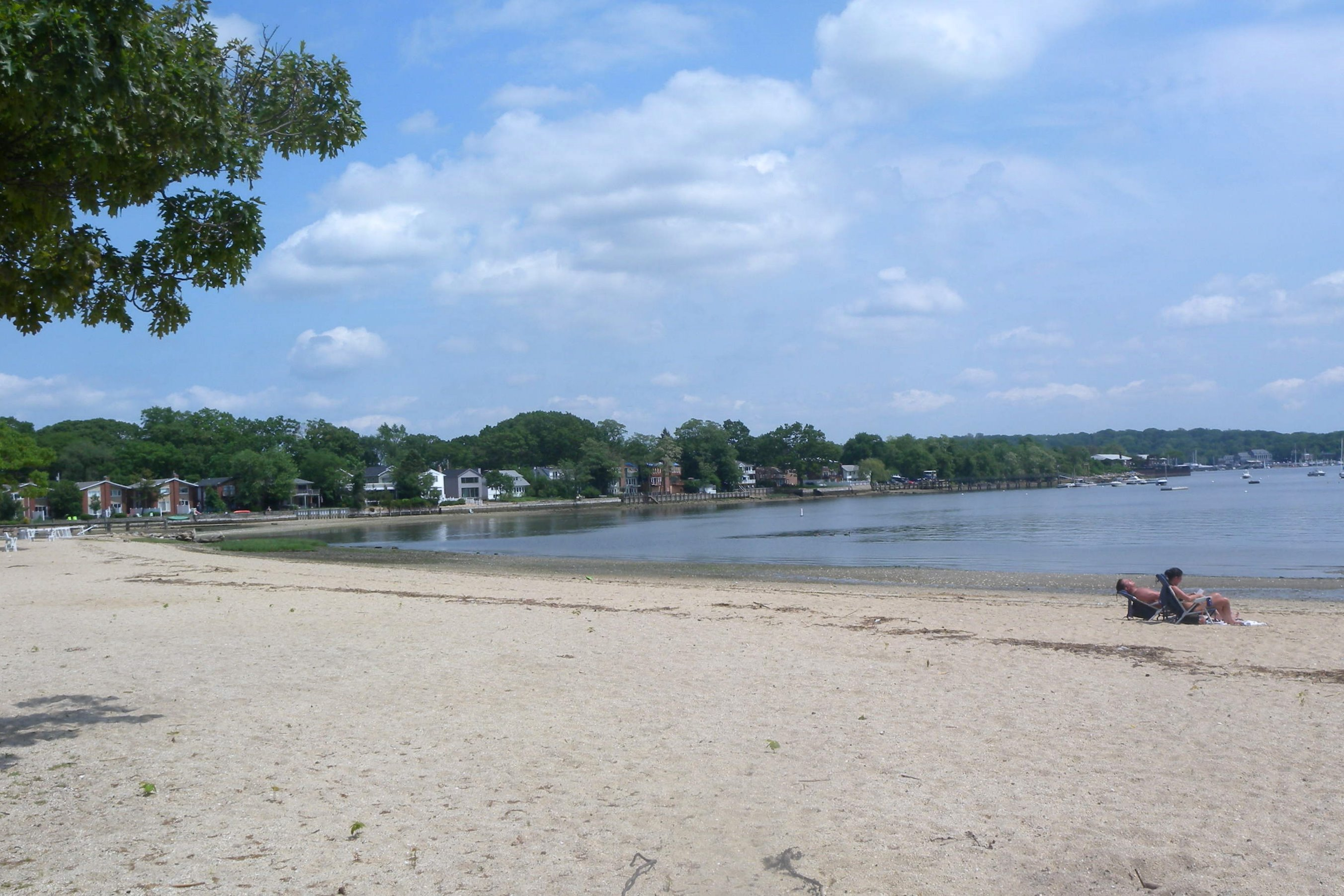
- The beach at Manorhaven Beach Park in 2011
- Interactive map of Manorhaven Beach Park
- Type: Public
- Location: Manorhaven, New York, United States
- Coordinates: 40°50′23.2″N 73°42′54.7″W
- Area: ~20 acres (~8.1 ha)
- Opened: c.1936
- Owner: Town of North Hempstead
- Operator: Town of North Hempstead Department of Parks and Recreation
- Paths: Yes
- Parking: Yes
- Website: Town of North Hempstead – Manorhaven Beach Park

Manorhaven Beach Park – also known as Manorhaven Town Park, Manorhaven Beach, Manorhaven Pool, and Manorhaven Park – is a major, 20-acre (8.1 ha) park owned and operated by the Town of North Hempstead, located along Manhasset Bay within the Incorporated Village of Manorhaven, in Nassau County, New York, United States.

== History ==
=== 20th century ===
==== Early history ====
Manorhaven Beach was taken over by the Town of North Hempstead in the 1930s under the administration of Supervisor Charles Snedeker, to create additional parkland in the town and to revitalize a major portion of Manorhaven's waterfront; this resulted in the creation of Manorhaven Town Park. The town-owned park subsequently opened c.1936, with new amenities and a bathhouse. Its opening provided North Hempstead with two town-operated beaches – the other being Bar Beach in unincorporated Port Washington, which was also improved about this time by North Hempstead.

In the years after opening, Manorhaven Beach became such a popular destination among both North Hempstead residents and non-residents – including people from Queens and Brooklyn – that overcrowding became an issue. By the 1940s, hundreds of nonresidents were using the beach on a typical summer day, exacerbating the overcrowding issues. This prompted the Town of North Hempstead to enforce the park's residency requirements in 1946 – a move which effectively limited admission to North Hempstead residents with proof of identification; this restriction is still effective as of 2025.

==== Park expansion ====
In 1957, officials in North Hempstead announced a $1 million plan to drastically expand and modernize Manorhaven Park. As part of the project, an Olympic-sized swimming pool and bathing pavilion would be constructed, a playground would be opened, new ballfields and other recreational facilities would be built, and additional picnic areas would be created. The new park pavilions would be designed by Port Washington-based architect Henry Titus Aspinwall. The project would also include the construction of an expanded parking lot, which would be constructed partially on landfill over Sheets Creek and marshland, and effectively growing the park's footprint by roughly 15 acres (6.1 ha); roughly 200,000 cubic yards of sand from Sheets Creek and Manhasset Bay would also be dredged for the landfill. Town officials further noted that state and federal funding – along with bonds – would be used to complete the project.

This park expansion project was initially met with controversy from several residents in Manorhaven, who expressed concerns over costs and traffic, among other things. There was also debate among some members of the public as to whether the project required a town-wide referendum. The project, furthermore, became a major issue in the 1957 race for North Hempstead Town Supervisor, in which the incumbent – Henry A. Sahm (R–Great Neck) – was ultimately re-elected.

In 1962, the Town of North Hempstead moved forward with the project. The pool's groundbreaking occurred on February 9, 1963, and the project was ultimately completed shortly thereafter, opening in time for the 1964 summer season with a dedication ceremony. The design of the pool would tie for second place in a national design competition in 1965, second only to Parkwood Pool in nearby Great Neck.

=== 21st century ===
Between 2010 and 2011, the pool facilities at Manorhaven Beach Park underwent extensive renovations and was modernized. The pool was significantly expanded to 23,000 square feet (2,100 m^{2}) and saw the addition of water slides and a zero-entry, while an additional, 2,500-square-foot (230 m^{2}) kiddie pool was built next to it. The seating areas and pavilion buildings were also extensively modernized, renovated, and expanded as part of the project. The renovated pool facility opened in June 2011, and pool membership increased by 250% following the completion of the $12 million project.

In 2015, the park's boat ramp was renovated, and the shoreline was stabilized.

== Amenities ==
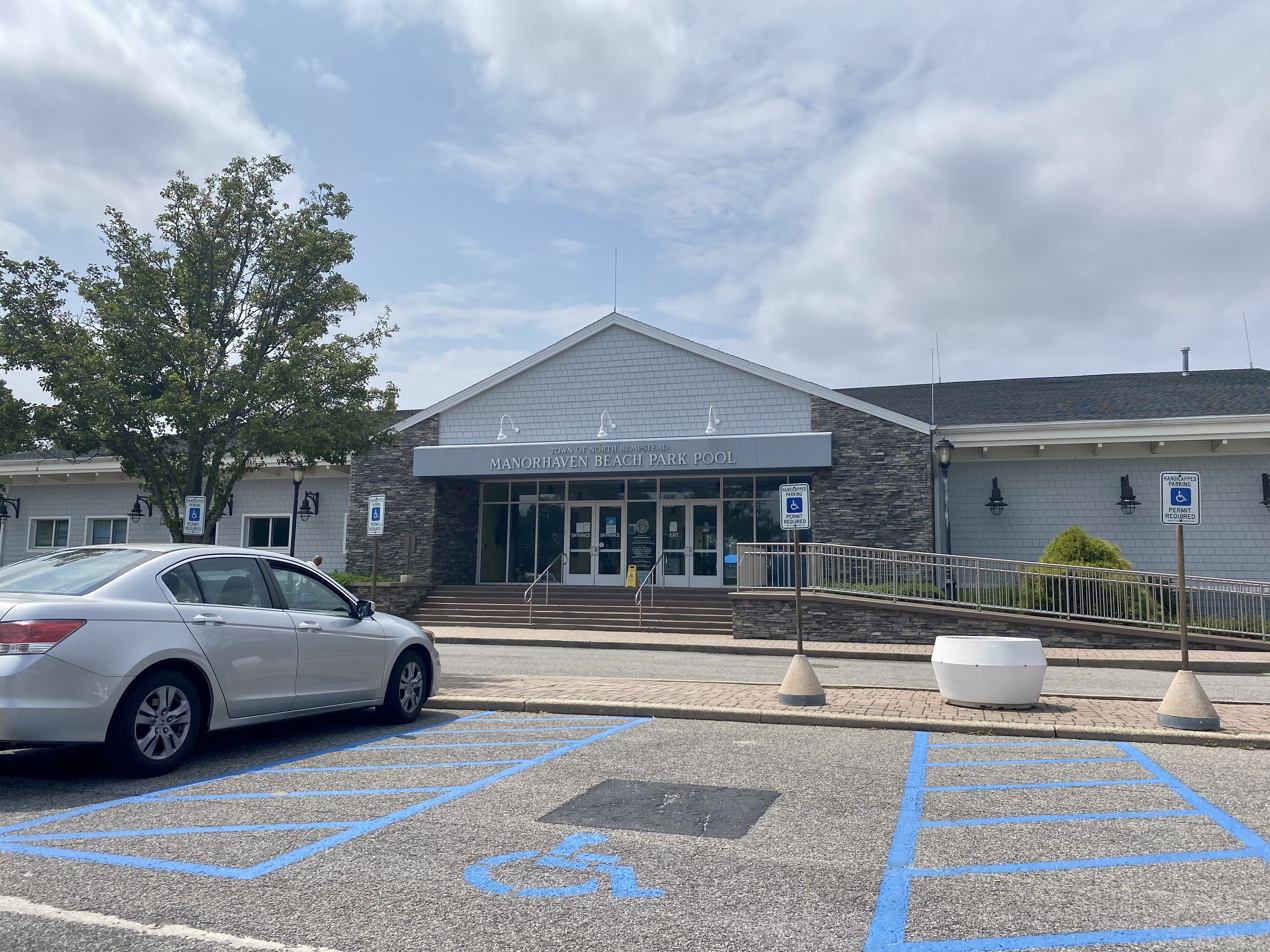
The entrance to the pool area at the park in 2021

As of 2025, Manorhaven Beach Park has the following amenities:

- Pools
- Beach
- Basketball courts
- Tennis courts
- Ballfields
- Kayak rentals
- Skating rink
- Skate park
- Walking paths
- Playground
- Boat launch

== See also ==
- North Hempstead Beach Park
- Harry Tappen Beach, Marina, and Pool
- Tobay Beach
