= Sands Point Seaplane Base =

- IATA: none; ICAO: none; FAA LID: 7N3

Summary
- Airport type: Public
- Owner: Safe Harbor Capri Marina
- Operator: Safe Harbor Capri Marina
- Location: Manorhaven and Port Washington, New York
- Elevation AMSL: 0 ft (0 m)
- Coordinates: 40°50′15″N 073°42′58″W

Map
- Interactive map of Sands Point Seaplane Base

Runways
Direction	Length		Surface
Direction	ft	m	Surface
1/19	6,000	1,829	Water
12/30	6,000	1,829	Water

Sands Point Seaplane Base (FAA LID: 7N3) is a seaplane landing area in Manhasset Bay, situated two miles (3 km) northwest of downtown Port Washington in the Town of North Hempstead, in Nassau County, Long Island, New York, United States.

== History ==
A seaplane base has existed in Port Washington since the early 20th century. Historically, the seaplane base was known as the Port Washington Seaplane Base, the New York Seaplane Base, and the Tom's Point Seaplane Base.

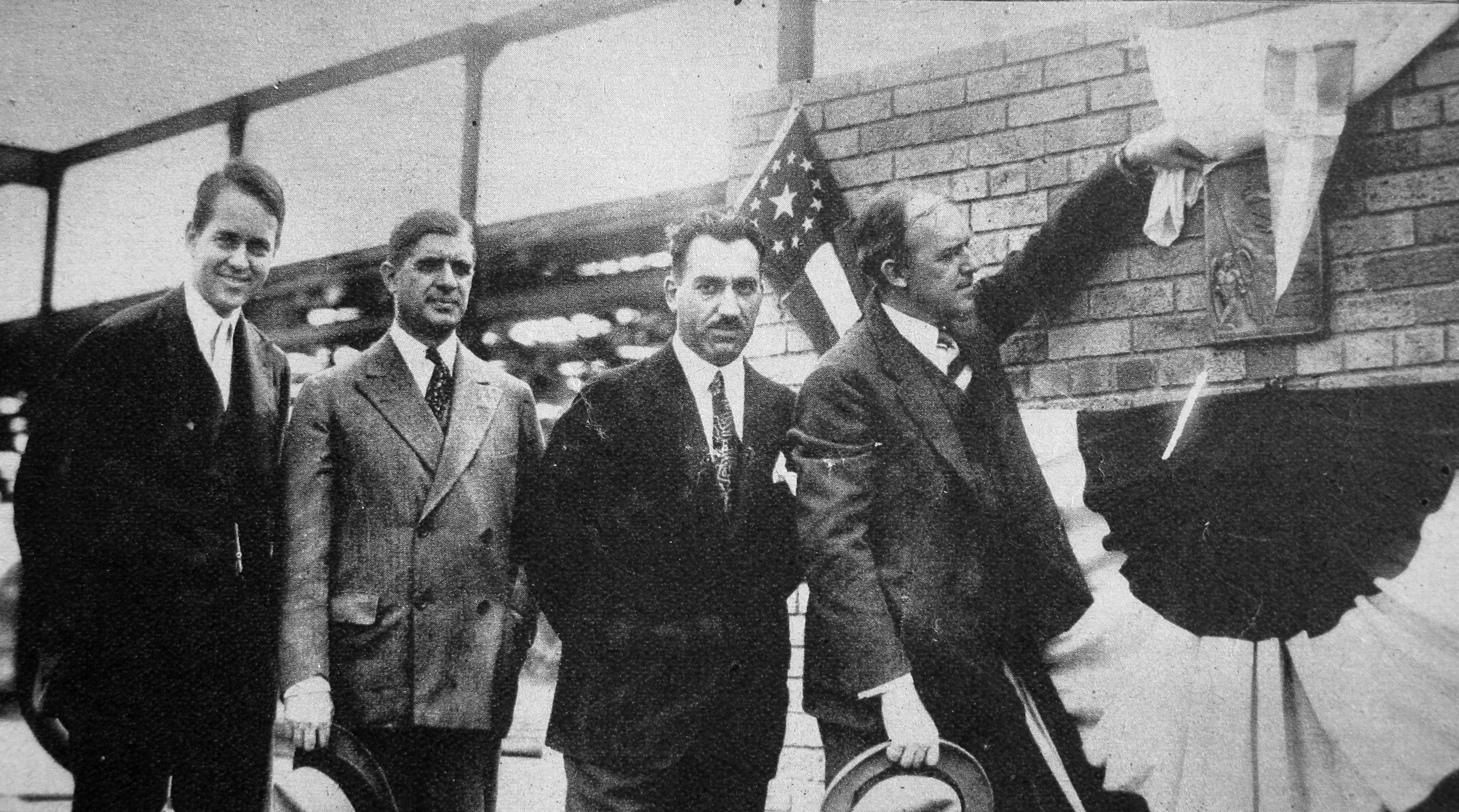
The dedication of the Port Washington Seaplane Airport in 1929.

On September 14, 1929, the cornerstone was laid for the American Aeronautical Corporation's New York Seaplane Airport – one of the earliest iterations of what would eventually become the Sands Point Seaplane Base.

Between 1939 and 1940, Port Washington was the New York base of Pan American World Airways' transatlantic Boeing 314 flights, prior to the opening of LaGuardia Airport's Marine Air Terminal. Pan American had purchased the facility from the Port Washington-based American Aeronautical Corporation in 1934. Pan Am also operated hangars along the shore of Manhasset Bay for its operations, at Tom's Point, located on Manhasset Isle in the Incorporated Village of Manorhaven.

After Pan Am moved its seaplane operations from Port Washington to LaGuardia Airport, Grumman became a major tenant at the seaplane base, using it as a facility for its seaplanes.

The current iteration of the seaplane base was activated in May 1948, around which time the original hangar and terminal area was abandoned.

== Facilities and aircraft ==
The seaplane base features two water runways (1/19 and 12/30) – both of which are 6,000 feet (1,800 m) long. Seaplanes are able to dock in Manhasset Bay, with the Port Washington Water Taxi ferrying pilots and passengers to and from the shore.

For the 12-month period ending August 12, 2022 the base had recorded 50 aircraft operations, of which 100% were classified as transient general aviation. At that time, 0 aircraft were based there. The seaplane base does not have a control tower.

== Accidents and incidents ==
On January 21, 1939, An Imperial Airways Short S.23 Empire Flying Boat Mk II (registration G-ADUU), en-route from Port Washington to Bermuda, ditched into the Atlantic Ocean during severe weather; the aircraft had experienced catastrophic engine failures, which had been caused by the accumulation of ice on the carburetor. The aircraft was damaged beyond repair and sank as a result of the crash. Of the flight's eight passengers and five crew members, there were three fatalities – two of which were passengers and one of which was a crew member.

== See also ==
- List of airports in New York
- Little Ferry Seaplane Base – Another seaplane base in the New York metropolitan area.
