= New Versailles =

Cancelled planned community in Nassau County, New York, United States

- A 1916 rendering of New Versailles, with the Chateau-on-the-Hill at top left

General information
- Status: Never built
- Coordinates: 40°49′10.02″N 73°41′54.34″W

Technical details
- Grounds: 186 acres (75 ha)

Design and construction
- Architect: Thomas Hastings

Other information
- Number of units: Approximately 2,500

New Versailles (also known as New Versailles on Manhasset Bay and American Versailles) was a 186-acre (75 ha) planned community proposed during the early 20th century, to be constructed along the eastern shore of Manhasset Bay within Port Washington and Plandome Manor, in Nassau County, New York, United States.

== Description ==
The buildings and grounds at New Versailles were to be built to plans designed principally by Thomas Hastings and his firm, Carrère and Hastings; New Versailles was to be designed as a luxurious community, with design inspiration from the Palace of Versailles in Versailles, France. The development was also to feature sculptures, artwork, and fountains by various prominent artists – including Frederick MacMonnies, Paul Bartlett, and Robert Ingersoll Aitken.

New Versailles was to consist of two main segments: the Chateau-by-the-Sea and the Chateau-on-the-Hill, occupying the western and eastern halves of the planned community, respectively. In total, there were to be 2,000 luxury cooperative apartments and 500 waterside apartments – enough to house over 3,000 people. Amenities were to include, among other things, a theater, a marina, gymnasiums, swimming pools, fountains, an ice rink, restaurants, galleries, an aviation field, a golf course, a parking garage for 1,000 vehicles, and a school.

The development would have been located primarily within the hamlet of Port Washington, while the western third would have been within modern-day Plandome Manor.

== History ==
New Versailles was first proposed in 1916 by a consortium of prominent figures – primarily artists, who formed a firm known as the Dominion of Versailles. These individuals sought to create a luxurious planned community – an "American Versailles" – on the bay, and the massive development was marketed as being "the biggest architectural feature or mass in America" at the time of its planning. Much of the development was to be built atop former farms and estates.

The development of New Versailles was critically hindered by the financial repercussions resulting from the onset of World War I. The war efforts resulted in a lack of adequate funding for the plans for New Versailles, and the project ultimately being cancelled.

Much of the land on which New Versailles would have been built was ultimately developed as the Manhasset Bay Estates neighborhood of Port Washington.

== See also ==
- Beacon Towers
- Cedarmere-Clayton Estates
- Hempstead House
- Harbor Hill
- New York Public Library Main Branch
