= Manorhaven, New York =

Village in the United States

- Village
- Incorporated Village of Manorhaven
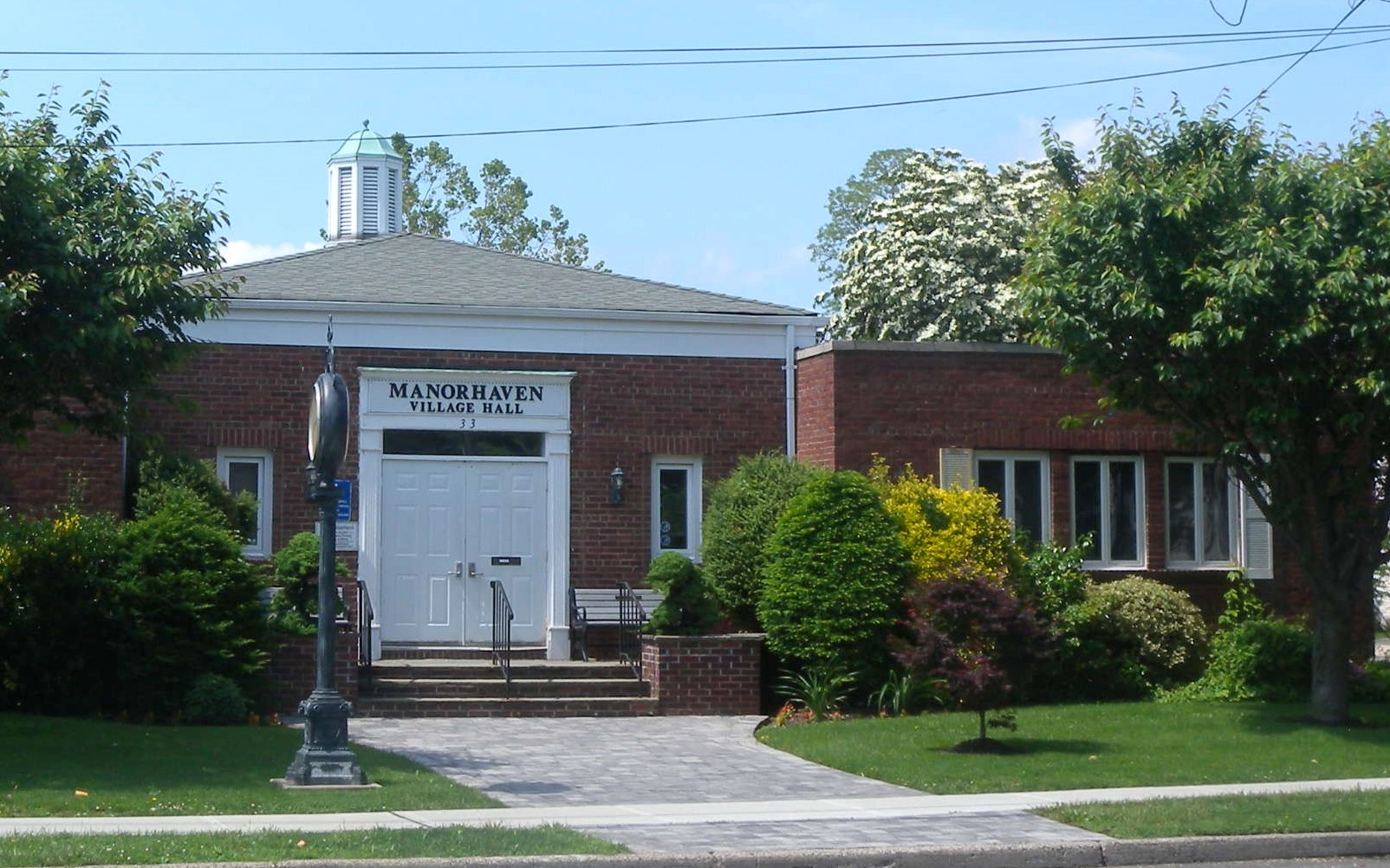
- Manorhaven Village Hall in 2011

- Official Seal of Manorhaven
- Nicknames: Haven; VOM
- Motto(s): "Free Enterprise"; "The Pearl of Manhasset Bay"
- Location in Nassau County and the state of New York

- Location on Long Island Location within the state of New York
- Coordinates: 40°50′31″N 73°42′50″W
- Country: United States
- State: New York
- County: Nassau
- Town: North Hempstead
- Incorporated: October 1, 1930

Government
  - Mayor: John S. Popeleski
  - Deputy Mayor: Harry Farina

Area
  - Total: 0.63 sq mi (1.64 km^{2})
  - Land: 0.47 sq mi (1.22 km^{2})
  - Water: 0.17 sq mi (0.43 km^{2})
- Elevation: 16 ft (5 m)

Population (2020)
  - Total: 6,956
  - Density: 14,816.2/sq mi (5,720.55/km^{2})
- Demonym(s): Manorhavenite; Port Washingtonian
- Time zone: UTC-5 (Eastern (EST))
  - Summer (DST): UTC-4 (EDT)
- ZIP code: 11050 (Port Washington)
- Area codes: 516, 363
- FIPS code: 36-45106
- GNIS feature ID: 0956378
- Website: manorhaven.gov

Manorhaven is a village in Nassau County, on the North Shore of Long Island, in New York, United States. It is considered part of the Greater Port Washington area, which is anchored by Port Washington. The population was 6,956 at the time of the 2020 census.

The Incorporated Village of Manorhaven is located on the Cow Neck Peninsula, within the Town of North Hempstead.

== History ==
Manorhaven was incorporated as a village in 1930, after news was spread that Port Washington was planning on incorporating itself as a city. The majority of residents in what would ultimately become the Village of Manorhaven wished to retain home rule, leading to a push to incorporate and a referendum on the matter being held that year. This referendum was held that September 11, with residents voting 34-to-0 in favor of incorporation, and subsequently, on October 1, 1930, Manorhaven was officially established as an incorporated village, with the signing of its certificate of incorporation; its population, at the time, was 376. Later that month, residents elected Charles Wesley Copp as the Village's first Mayor.

1930 also saw the establishment of a ferry between Bowman's Point Road in modern-day Manorhaven to New Rochelle in Westchester County via (and across) the Long Island Sound, after the courts ruled in favor of its establishment in a legal dispute over the proposal; the service was established a few months prior to the village's incorporation. This ferry – operated by the Port Washington–New Rochelle Ferry Co., Inc. – would run until 1939, when the Bronx–Whitestone Bridge opened further to the west.

In 1931 – one year after Manorhaven incorporated, the village proposed annexing a large amount of territory to its east – including much of what would eventually become the Village of Port Washington North. Manorhaven's annexation bid was unsuccessful due to the residents in what would ultimately become Port Washington North preferring to incorporate as a separate village; Port Washington North ultimately incorporated as its own village one year later, in May 1932.

The Town of North Hempstead-owned Manorhaven Beach Park opened within the village circa 1936, revitalizing a major portion of Manorhaven's waterfront along Manhasset Bay.

Between 1939 and 1940, Manhasset Bay was used as the New York base of Pan American World Airways' transatlantic Boeing 314 flights, prior to the opening of LaGuardia Airport's Marine Air Terminal, with the airport's hangars and terminal located within Manorhaven – at Toms Point on Manhasset Isle, near the southern edge of the village; the facility was subsequently used by Grumman, following the Marine Air Terminal's opening. Although the seaplane hangars at Toms Point were eventually demolished, the seaplane base is still in use, with the airport's current iteration being activated in 1948.

In 1944, Nassau County announced that it would reconstruct Shore Road through the village, widening it to 70 feet (21 m) and eliminating dangerous curves.

In 1948, Manorhaven residents and officials debated whether to join the Port Washington Police District, and for the Port Washington Police to subsequently take over police operations in the village from the Nassau County Police Department. The proposal was rejected by residents, with the majority of village voters opting for the village remain under the Nassau County Police Department's jurisdiction.

On November 7, 1954, Manorhaven Village Hall opened to the public. The construction and completion of this municipal building came after village officials the proposal was raised by village officials – a proposal which dated back to the village's formative years, in the early 1930s. The building – designed by architect Edwin Kline – was constructed at a cost of $50,000 (1954 USD), and its erection provided the village's government with a permanent, dedicated home, where all village business could be conducted.

In the mid-1960s, the $2.8 million, 128-unit Manhasset House garden apartment complex was constructed on Toms Point, along the Manhasset Bay waterfront, adjacent to the former Pan Am seaplane hangars and apron; plans were unveiled for the complex in 1965. The six-acre (2.4 ha) complex – consisting of eight buildings and a swimming pool – was developed by the Syosset-based firm of Sokolov Associates, and designed by East Meadow-based architect Siegmund Spiegel.

In 1982, the Village of Manorhaven annexed approximately 20,000 square feet (1,900 m^{2}) of territory from unincorporated Port Washington.

In 1984, Manorhaven residents and officials again debated whether the village should join the Port Washington Police District. If approved, the PWPD would have taken over the police services within the village from the Nassau County Police Department. Proponents felt that the Port Washington Police District would be able to better serve the needs of the village, while opponents expressed concerns over potential tax increases. Ultimately, the residents of the village – just as they did roughly 36 years prior – voted to remain under the jurisdiction of the NCPD, as opposed to joining the PWPD.

In 2022, Manorhaven Boulevard (CR D44) underwent a major, $6 million rehabilitation and beautification project, carried out by Nassau County – which owns and maintains the road – in collaboration with the Village of Manorhaven. Among other things, the project included a roadway reconfiguration with traffic calming elements, beautified and upgraded sidewalks and associated infrastructure, drainage improvements to rectify longstanding defects that caused flooding in heavy rainstorms, landscaping improvements, new street furniture and bus shelters, accessibility improvements, and public artwork.

on June 20, 2023, the village's former Deputy Mayor Vincent Costa was defeated by one vote, after being accused of official misconduct.

In the summer of 2025, Manorhaven Village Hall underwent a renovation project, modernizing interior spaces and lighting through a Justice Court Access Program grant.

=== Etymology ===
The name of the village was selected by locals, who felt that the portmanteau of "Manor" and "Haven" formed a name that appropriately reflected the feel and nature of the community and its environs. The locals opted to combine the two words, resulting in "Manorhaven" becoming the village's name. Thus, the name of the village is a portmanteau.

== Geography ==
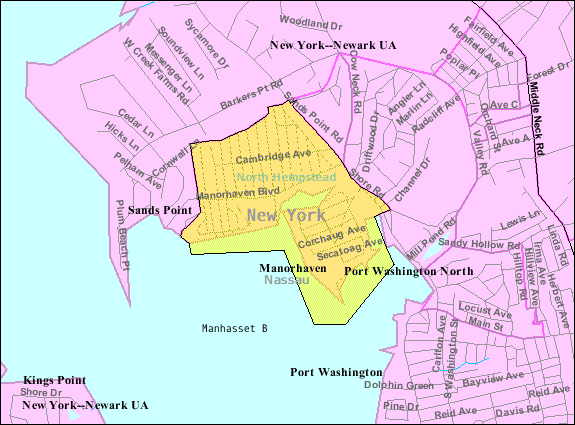
U.S. Census map of Manorhaven

According to the United States Census Bureau, the village has a total area of 0.6 square miles (1.6 km^{2}), of which 0.5 square miles (1.3 km^{2}) is land and 0.2 square miles (0.52 km^{2}), or 25.40%, is water.

Additionally, Manorhaven is located on the northern half of the Cow Neck Peninsula, and its territory includes Sheets Creek and portions of Manhasset Bay.

Manorhaven is located within the Manhasset Bay Watershed, which, in turn, places it within the larger Long Island Sound/Atlantic Ocean Watershed.

=== Topography ===
Like the rest of Long Island's North Shore, Manorhaven is situated on a terminal moraine, known as the Harbor Hill Moraine. This terminal moraine was formed by glaciers during the Wisconsin Glacial Episode, and is named for Harbor Hill in Roslyn; Harbor Hill is the highest geographic point in Nassau County.

According to the United States Environmental Protection Agency and the United States Geological Survey, the highest point in Manorhaven is located at the northeastern corner of the village, at approximately 90 feet (27 m), and the lowest point is Manhasset Bay, which is at sea level.

=== Climate ===
Manorhaven has a humid subtropical climate (Cfa), bordering on a hot-summer humid continental climate (Dfa). Average monthly temperatures in the village range from 31.8 °F in January to 75.3 °F in July.

Climate data for Manorhaven, New York, 1991–2020 normals, extremes 1999–present
Month	Jan	Feb	Mar	Apr	May	Jun	Jul	Aug	Sep	Oct	Nov	Dec	Year
Record high °F (°C)	71 (22)	73 (23)	87 (31)	94 (34)	96 (36)	101 (38)	108 (42)	105 (41)	97 (36)	89 (32)	83 (28)	76 (24)	108 (42)
Mean daily maximum °F (°C)	39.8 (4.3)	41.9 (5.5)	48.7 (9.3)	59.7 (15.4)	69.4 (20.8)	78.6 (25.9)	84.0 (28.9)	82.6 (28.1)	76.4 (24.7)	65.2 (18.4)	54.5 (12.5)	45.0 (7.2)	62.2 (16.7)
Daily mean °F (°C)	33.0 (0.6)	34.5 (1.4)	41.0 (5.0)	51.2 (10.7)	60.8 (16.0)	70.2 (21.2)	75.9 (24.4)	74.8 (23.8)	68.3 (20.2)	57.3 (14.1)	47.1 (8.4)	38.6 (3.7)	54.4 (12.5)
Mean daily minimum °F (°C)	26.1 (−3.3)	27.1 (−2.7)	33.2 (0.7)	42.6 (5.9)	52.2 (11.2)	61.8 (16.6)	67.8 (19.9)	66.9 (19.4)	60.3 (15.7)	49.5 (9.7)	39.8 (4.3)	32.1 (0.1)	46.6 (8.1)
Record low °F (°C)	−4 (−20)	−5 (−21)	5 (−15)	13 (−11)	34 (1)	43 (6)	50 (10)	46 (8)	38 (3)	27 (−3)	18 (−8)	−2 (−19)	−5 (−21)
Average precipitation inches (mm)	3.86 (98)	3.06 (78)	4.30 (109)	4.02 (102)	3.75 (95)	4.31 (109)	4.06 (103)	4.33 (110)	4.22 (107)	4.20 (107)	3.42 (87)	4.31 (109)	47.84 (1,214)
Average snowfall inches (cm)	1.85 (4.7)	7.8 (20)	3.7 (9.4)	0.3 (0.76)	0 (0)	0 (0)	0 (0)	0 (0)	0 (0)	0 (0)	0.2 (0.51)	5.7 (14)	19.55 (49.37)
Average relative humidity (%)	73	75	72	72	75	74	73	71	73	73	71	75	73
Average dew point °F (°C)	22.0 (−5.6)	22.3 (−5.4)	27.3 (−2.6)	37.0 (2.8)	48.2 (9.0)	58.9 (14.9)	64.4 (18.0)	64.2 (17.9)	58.1 (14.5)	47.2 (8.4)	36.5 (2.5)	27.9 (−2.3)	42.8 (6.0)
Mean monthly sunshine hours	177	153	172	167	202	213	237	241	215	190	210	171	2,348
Mean daily daylight hours	9.6	10.7	12.0	13.3	14.5	15.1	14.8	13.7	12.4	11.1	9.9	9.3	12.2
Average ultraviolet index	2	2	2	4	5	6	6	6	5	3	2	2	4
Source 1: NOAA, PRISM, The Weather Channel (temperatures, average dew points, and average precipitation)
Source 2: Weather Spark (all other data)

==== Plant zone ====
According to the United States Department of Agriculture, the village is located within hardiness zone 7b.

== Demographics ==
Historical population
Census	Pop.	Note	%±
1940	484		—
1950	1,819		275.8%
1960	3,566		96.0%
1970	5,488		53.9%
1980	5,384		−1.9%
1990	5,672		5.3%
2000	6,138		8.2%
2010	6,556		6.8%
2020	6,956		6.1%
U.S. Decennial Census

=== Racial and ethnic composition ===
Manorhaven village, New York – Racial and ethnic composition Note: the US Census treats Hispanic/Latino as an ethnic category. This table excludes Latinos from the racial categories and assigns them to a separate category. Hispanics/Latinos may be of any race.
Race / Ethnicity (NH = Non-Hispanic)	Pop 2000	Pop 2010	Pop 2020	% 2000	% 2010	% 2020
White alone (NH)	3,903	3,447	3,195	63.59%	52.58%	45.93%
Black or African American alone (NH)	73	90	106	1.19%	1.37%	1.52%
Native American or Alaska Native alone (NH)	7	3	4	0.11%	0.05%	0.06%
Asian alone (NH)	820	1,150	995	13.36%	17.54%	14.30%
Native Hawaiian or Pacific Islander alone (NH)	0	0	2	0.00%	0.00%	0.03%
Other race alone (NH)	14	7	36	0.23%	0.11%	0.52%
Mixed race or Multiracial (NH)	124	84	131	2.02%	1.28%	1.88%
Hispanic or Latino (any race)	1,197	1,775	2,487	19.50%	27.07%	35.75%
Total	6,138	6,556	6,956	100.00%	100.00%	100.00%

=== 2020 census ===
As of the 2020 census, Manorhaven had a population of 6,956. The median age was 39.3 years. 23.5% of residents were under the age of 18 and 14.8% were 65 years of age or older. For every 100 females, there were 95.8 males, and for every 100 females age 18 and over, there were 91.1 males.

100.0% of residents lived in urban areas, while 0.0% lived in rural areas.

There were 2,534 households, of which 38.0% had children under the age of 18 living in them. Of all households, 47.2% were married-couple households, 17.3% were households with a male householder and no spouse or partner present, and 28.4% were households with a female householder and no spouse or partner present. About 23.9% of all households were made up of individuals, and 11.5% had someone living alone who was 65 years of age or older.

There were 2,699 housing units, of which 6.1% were vacant. The homeowner vacancy rate was 1.5%, and the rental vacancy rate was 4.2%.

=== 2010 census ===
As of the 2010 census, there were 6,556 people residing in the village. The population density was 14,103.7 inhabitants per square mile (5,445.5/km^{2}). The racial makeup of the village was 52.6% White alone, 0.05% Native American, 17.5% Asian, 1.4% African American, 0.1% from other races, 1.3% Two or more races, and 0.1% from other races. Hispanic or Latino of any race were 27.1% of the population.

=== 2000 census ===
As of the census of 2000, there were 6,138 people, 2,401 households, and 1,627 families residing in the village. The population density was 13,055.6 inhabitants per square mile (5,040.8/km^{2}). There were 2,471 housing units at an average density of 5,255.8 per square mile (2,029.3/km^{2}). The racial makeup of the village was 76.60% White, 1.30% African American, 0.26% Native American, 13.38% Asian, 5.16% from other races, and 3.29% from two or more races. Hispanic or Latino of any race were 19.50% of the population.

There were 2,401 households, out of which 31.5% had children under the age of 18 living with them, 52.9% were married couples living together, 10.9% had a female householder with no husband present, and 32.2% were non-families. 25.7% of all households were made up of individuals, and 7.5% had someone living alone who was 65 years of age or older. The average household size was 2.56 and the average family size was 3.07.

In the village, the population was spread out, with 22.3% under the age of 18, 6.4% from 18 to 24, 36.7% from 25 to 44, 23.8% from 45 to 64, and 10.9% who were 65 years of age or older. The median age was 37 years. For every 100 females, there were 98.0 males. For every 100 females age 18 and over, there were 95.9 males.

The median income for a household in the village was $61,474, and the median income for a family was $66,744. Males had a median income of $45,733 versus $43,182 for females. The per capita income for the village was $36,254. About 7.6% of families and 8.9% of the population were below the poverty line, including 14.1% of those under age 18 and 5.8% of those age 65 or over.

== Government ==
=== Village government ===
As of July 2025, the Mayor of Manorhaven is John S. Popeleski, the Deputy Mayor is Harry Farina, and the Village Trustees are Harry Farina, Monica Ildefonso, Khristine Shahipour and Jeffrey Stone.

The following is a list of Manorhaven's mayors, from 1930 to present:

Mayors of Manorhaven
Mayor's name	Year(s) in office
Charles W. Copp, Jr.	1930–1938
James L. Brownlee, Jr.	1938–1948
John F. Crampton	1948–1956
James J. Connern	1956–1958
Harry T. Johnson	1958
Frank J. Mascia	1958–1959
Everett Kinney	1959–1972
William Cerulli	1972–1974
Dennis Watt	1974–1975
John Urcan	1975
John Maher	1975–1976
James F. Mattei	1976–1986
Arlene Musselwhite	1986–1992
Gary Pagano	1992–1998
James Tomlinson	1998–2000
Nicholas Capozzi	2000–2008
Michael Meehan	2008–2012
John DiLeo	2012
Giovanna Giunta	2012–2016
James M. Avena	2016–2022
John S. Popeleski	2022–Present

=== Representation in higher government ===
==== Town representation ====
Manorhaven is located in the Town of North Hempstead's 6th council district, which as of July 2025 is represented in the North Hempstead Town Council by Mariann Dalimonte (D–Port Washington).

==== Nassau County representation ====
Manorhaven is located in Nassau County's 11th Legislative district, which as of July 2025 is represented in the Nassau County Legislature by Delia DiRiggi-Whitton (D–Glen Cove).

==== New York State representation ====
===== New York State Assembly =====
Manorhaven is located within the New York State Assembly's 16th State Assembly district, which as of July 2025 is represented by Daniel J. Norber (R–Great Neck).

===== New York State Senate =====
Manorhaven is located in the New York State Senate's 7th State Senate district, which as of July 2025 is represented by Jack M. Martins (R–Old Westbury).

==== Federal representation ====
===== United States Congress =====
Manorhaven is located in New York's 3rd congressional district, which as of July 2025 is represented by Thomas R. Suozzi (D–Glen Cove).

==== United States Senate ====
Like the rest of New York, Manorhaven is represented in the United States Senate by Charles E. Schumer (D) and Kirsten Gillibrand (D).

=== Politics ===
In the 2024 U.S. presidential election, the majority of Manorhaven voters voted for Kamala D. Harris (D). Harris carried the village with 55.3% of the vote (1,505 votes), while Donald J. Trump (R) received 43.6% (1,186 votes). Third party candidates and write-ins, collectively, constituted the remaining 1.2% of the vote (32 votes).

== Parks and recreation ==
- Manorhaven Beach Park – a major park owned and operated by the Town of North Hempstead, located along Manhasset Bay within the village.
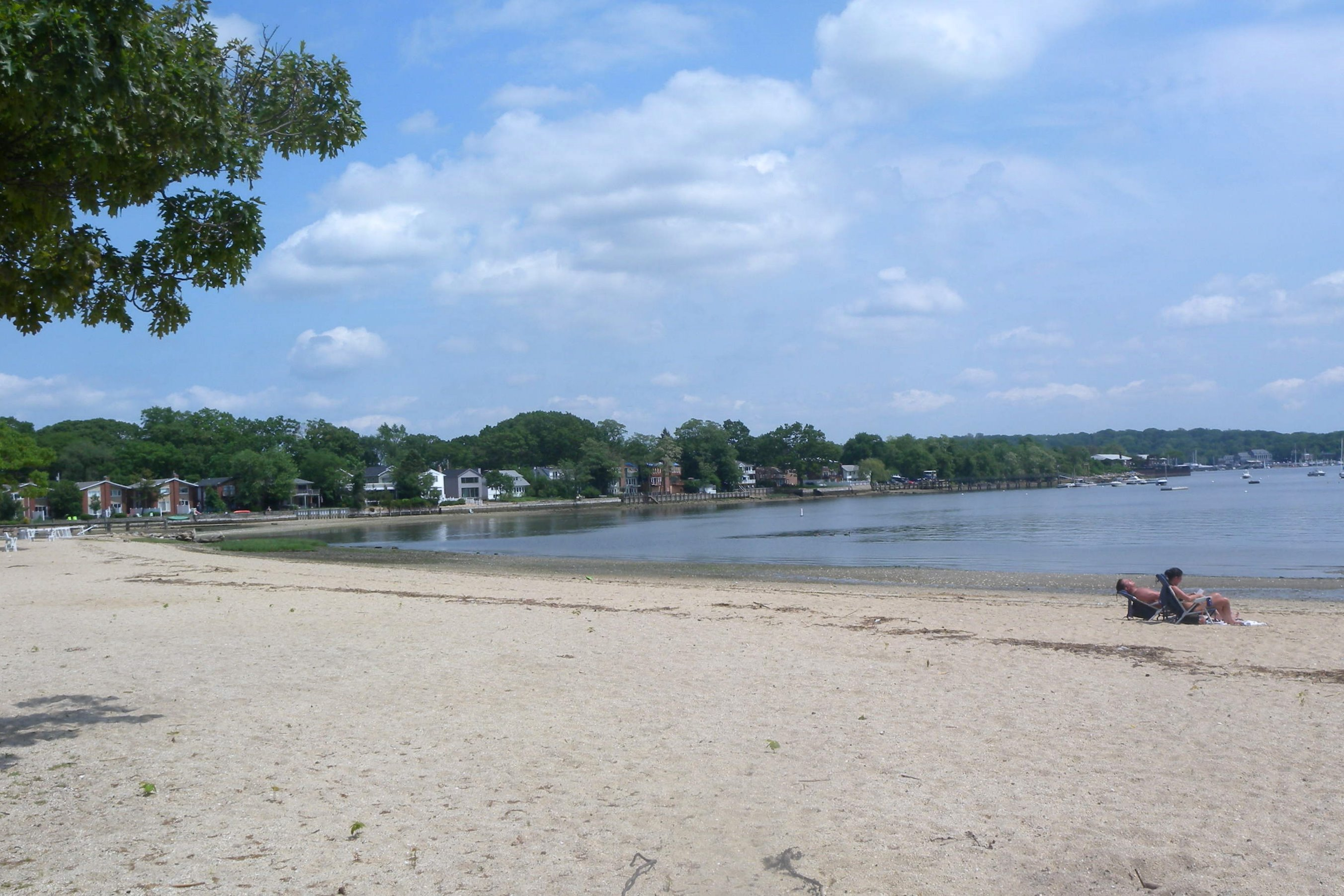
  Manorhaven Beach Park in 2011
- Morgan's Dock Park – a smaller, village-owned park along Manhasset Bay, just north of Manorhaven Beach Park.
- Manorhaven Preserve – a village-owned nature preserve along Sheets Creek.

== Education ==
=== School district ===
The Village of Manorhaven is located entirely within the boundaries of the Port Washington Union Free School District. As such, all children who reside within Manorhaven and attend public schools go to Port Washington's schools.

=== Library district ===
Manorhaven is located within the boundaries of the Port Washington Library District, which is served by the Port Washington Public Library in Baxter Estates.

== Infrastructure ==
=== Transportation ===
==== Road ====
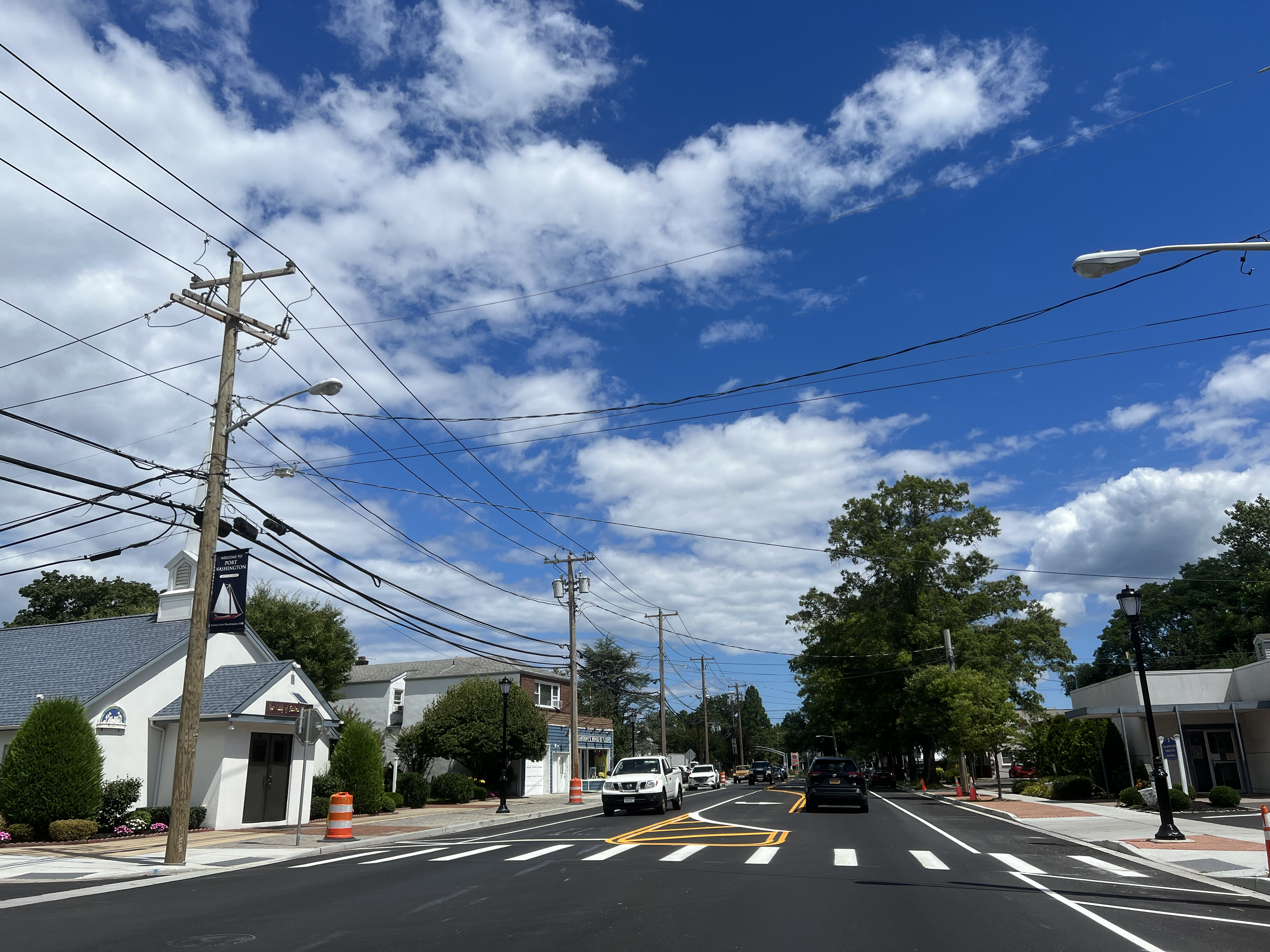
Manorhaven Boulevard in August 2022

Major roads in Manorhaven include Manhasset Avenue, Manorhaven Boulevard (CR D44), Orchard Beach Boulevard, Sands Point Road, and Shore Road (CR E25).

===== Road layout =====
The majority of the street layout in Manorhaven resembles the traditional street grid. Manhasset Avenue in the southern part of the village is a notable exception, as it traverses the grid diagonally. Many streets use street-naming conventions of local Native American tribes and places (i.e.: Mohegan Avenue) and of woods (i.e.: Cottonwood Road).

==== Bus ====
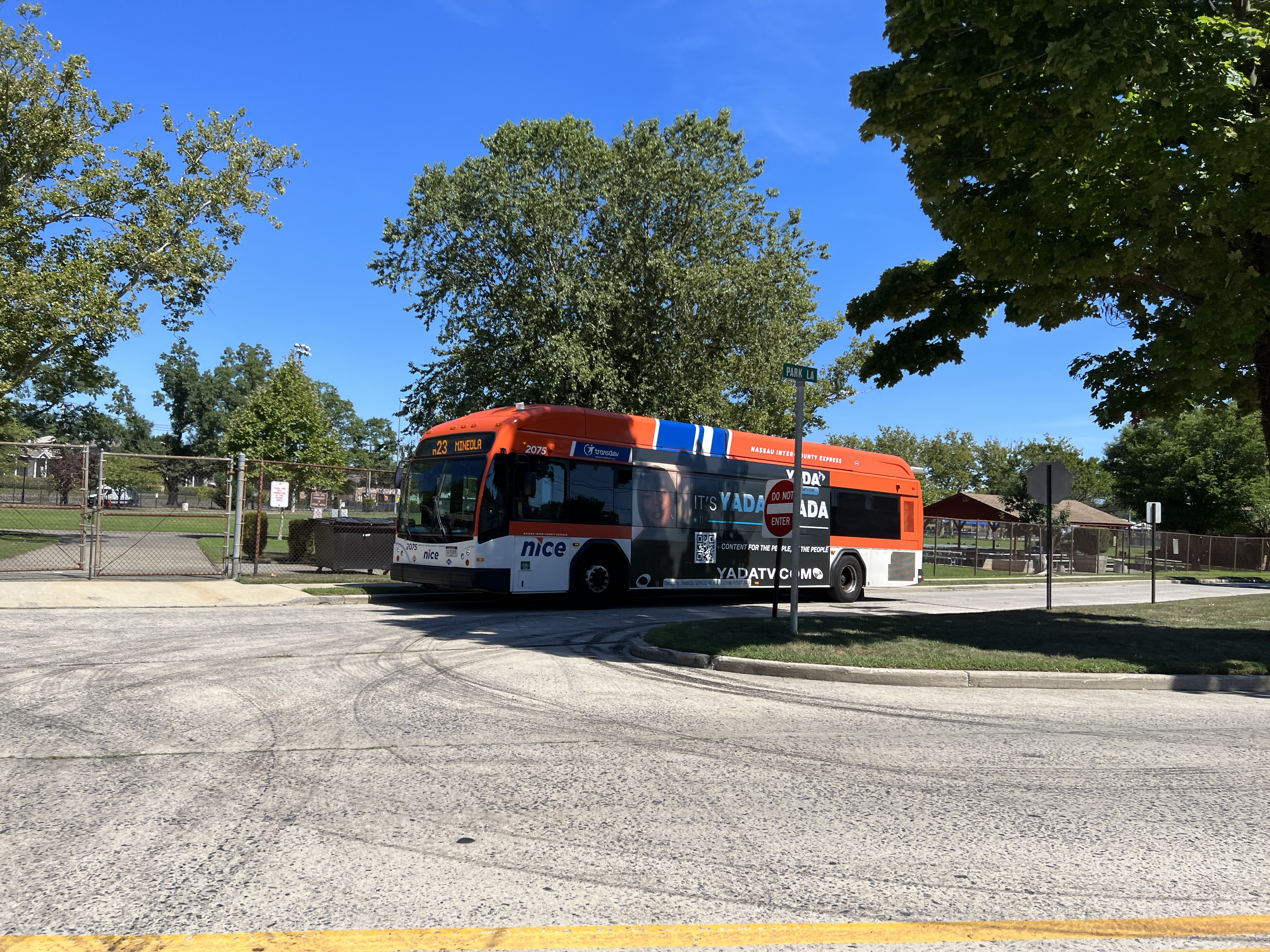
A Mineola-bound n23 bus on Park Lane in September 2022

As of July 2024, Manorhaven is served by one Nassau Inter-County Express (NICE) bus route: the n23, which runs between it and the Mineola Intermodal Center in the Village of Mineola.

=== Utilities ===
==== Natural gas ====
National Grid USA provides natural gas to homes and businesses that are hooked up to natural gas lines in Manorhaven.

==== Power ====
PSEG Long Island, provides power to all homes and businesses within Manorhaven.

==== Sewage ====
Manorhaven maintains a village sanitary sewer system, which, through a contract, has its sewage transferred to – and treated by – the Port Washington Water Pollution Control District.

==== Water ====
Manorhaven is located within the boundaries of the Port Washington Water District, which provides the entirety of the village with water.

=== Healthcare and emergency services ===
==== Healthcare ====
No hospitals are located within Manorhaven. The nearest hospital is St. Francis Hospital, located in nearby Flower Hill.

==== Fire ====
The Village of Manorhaven, in its entirety, is located within the boundaries of (and is thus served by) the Port Washington Fire District.

==== Police ====
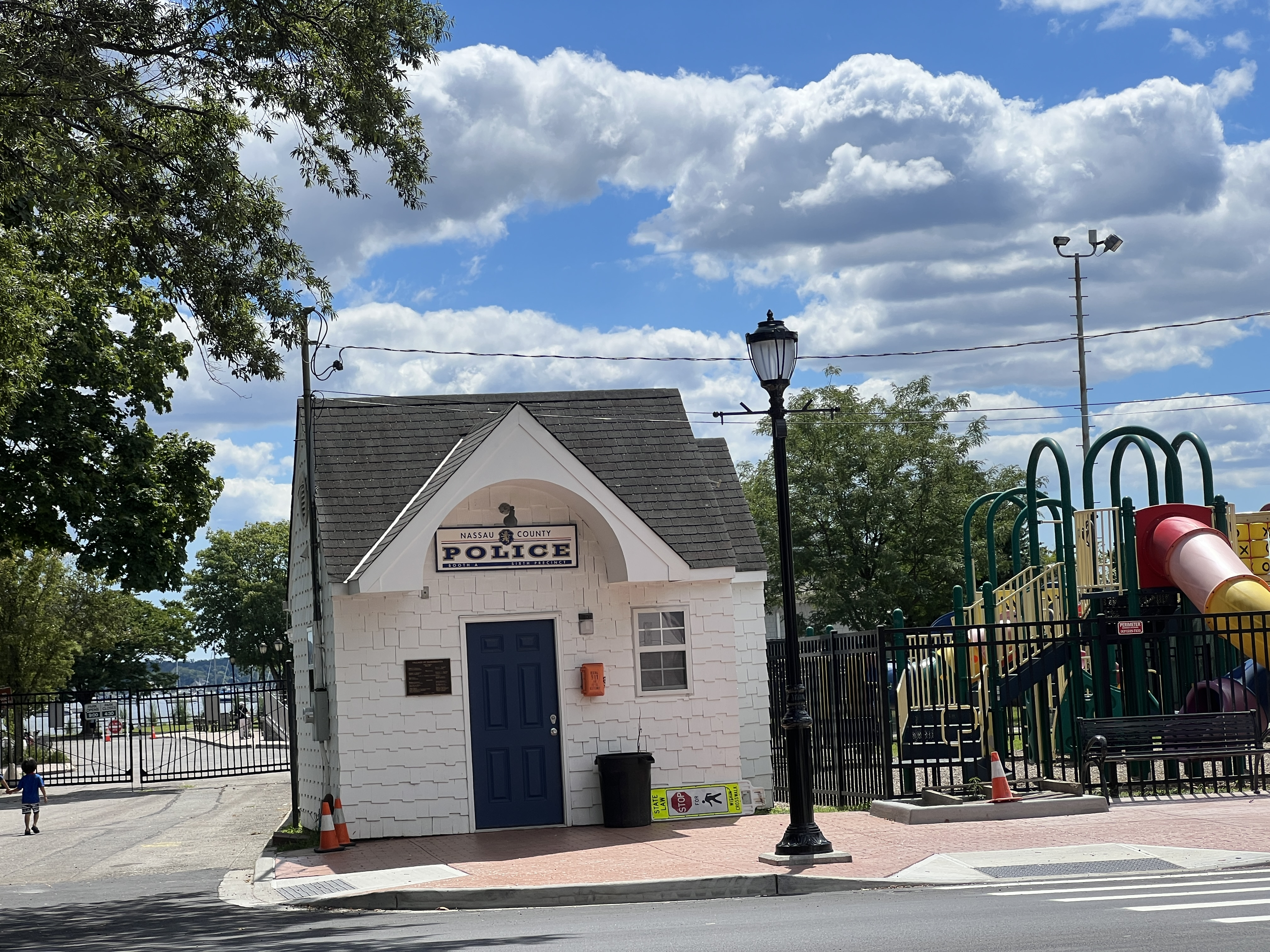
The Nassau County Police Department's Manorhaven police booth

The Village of Manorhaven is served by the Sixth Precinct of the Nassau County Police Department.

Additionally, the Sixth Precinct operates a police booth in the village, along Manorhaven Boulevard.

== Notable people ==
- Gina L. Sillitti – Politician. Sillitti served as the area's representative in the New York State Assembly between January 6, 2021 and December 31, 2024.
- Manuel Levine – Lawyer, former Justice of the New York Supreme Court, and former District Attorney of Nassau County; served as Manorhaven's Village Justice from 1930 to 1932.

== See also ==
- List of municipalities in New York
- Cow Neck Peninsula
