= 1939 Imperial Airways Short Empire ditching =

Aviation incident in the Atlantic Ocean

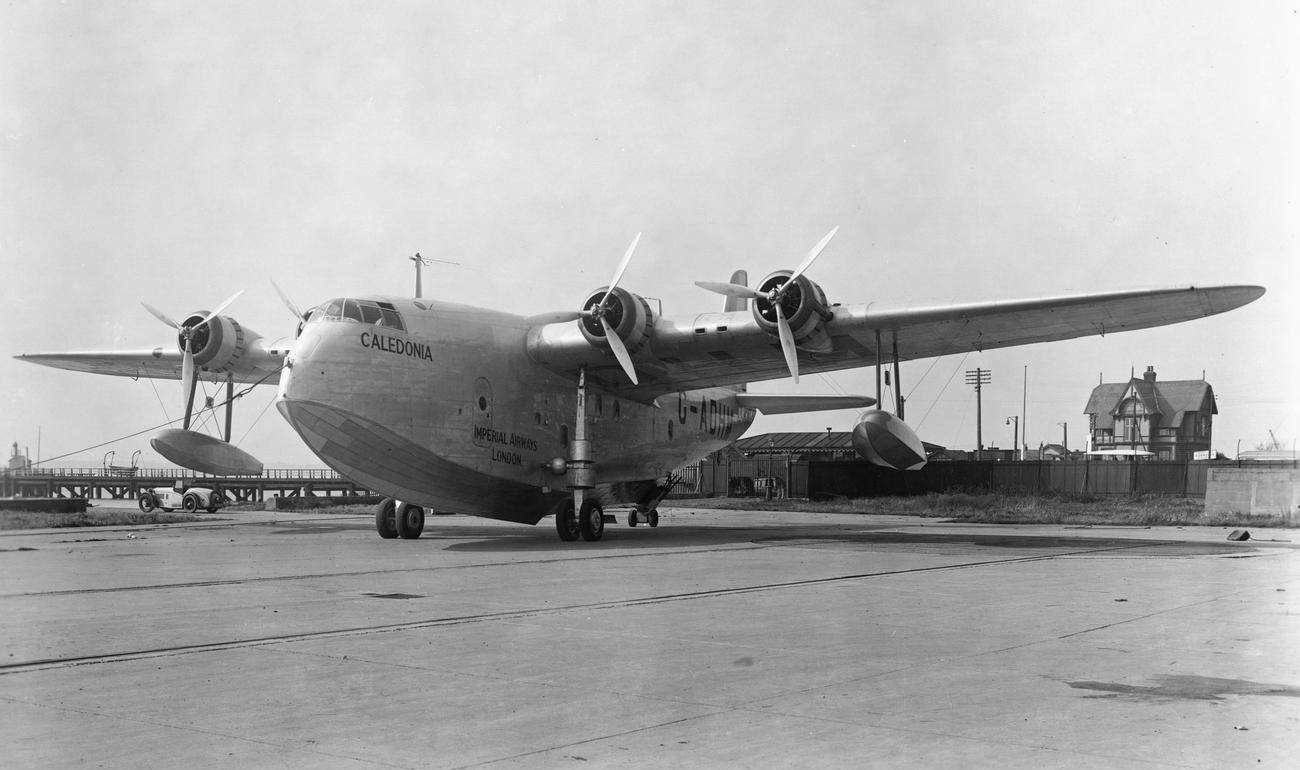
- A Short Empire similar to the aircraft in the ditching

Accident
- Date: 21 January 1939
- Summary: Ditched due to engine icing and sank in heavy seas
- Site: Atlantic Ocean

Aircraft
- Aircraft type: Short S.23 Empire
- Aircraft name: Cavalier
- Operator: Imperial Airways
- Registration: G-ADUU
- Flight origin: Port Washington, New York, United States
- Destination: Bermuda
- Occupants: 13
- Passengers: 8
- Crew: 5
- Fatalities: 3
- Injuries: 10
- Survivors: 10

On 21 January 1939, the Imperial Airways Short Empire flying boat Cavalier, en route from New York City to Bermuda, lost power to its engines and ditched in heavy seas approximately 285 miles (459 km) southeast of New York. It subsequently sank, resulting in the death of 3 passengers out of 13 passengers and crew. Ten hours later, the survivors were picked up by the tanker Esso Baytown.

== Aircraft ==
Cavalier was a Short Empire flying boat with the registration G-ADUU that had been launched on 21 November 1936 and delivered to Imperial Airways.

In 1937, Imperial Airways and Pan American World Airways had opened up a London-New York-Bermuda flying-boat passenger service. Imperial Airways used Cavalier on the route. Shipped by sea to Bermuda, it operated on the route for the first time on a survey flight on 25 May 1937.

== Accident ==
On the day of the incident, Cavalier left the Port Washington Seaplane Airport in Port Washington, on Long Island, New York, at 10:38 bound for Bermuda. At 12:23 p.m. the flying boat sent the message Running into bad weather. May have to earth, which referred to earthing the aerial; this was followed by another message at 12:27 Still in bad weather. Severe Static. Port Washington tried to call the Cavalier for the next 15 minutes but did not get a reply. At 12:57 Cavalier broadcast an SOS message followed at 12:59 by All engines failing through ice. Altitude 1,500 ft [457 m]. Forced landing in a few minutes. Another message eight minutes later said it was still flying but on two engines; four minutes after that came a series of messages to say that it had had to come down in the sea. The last message, at 13:13, was the single word Sinking.

== Rescue ==
As soon as it was realised at Port Washington that Cavalier was going to land in the sea, Port Washington requested a Pan American World Airways Sikorsky S-42 flying boat from Hamilton, Bermuda, to participate in search and rescue. The United States Coast Guard sent a flying boat from Long Island to Cavalier's last known position but it was not found there. A United States Army Air Corps Boeing B-17 Flying Fortress heavy bomber made a sortie from Langley Field in Virginia to search for Cavalier but had to return before midnight without success. Other aircraft also tried in vain to find the Cavalier.

The US Coast Guard also dispatched two cutters and two patrol boats to the scene; one was only 70 nautical miles (130 km) away but the other three had to come from Cape Cod, Massachusetts; New York; and Norfolk, Virginia. The commercial tanker Esso Baytown was the first to arrive at the scene of the accident and reported at 23:25 that wreckage had been spotted and lifeboats had been lowered. By listening for the survivors' calls for help Esso Baytown rescued six passengers and four members of the crew who had clung together on the water for ten hours. The United States Navy gunboat USS Erie (PG-50) transferred a doctor to Esso Baytown but because of the high seas and darkness had to discontinue the search for any other survivors. The ten survivors were taken to New York, arriving on 23 January 1939; the other three people aboard drowned at sea.

== Report ==
The British Air Ministry's Inspector of Accidents reported that the accident had been caused by icing in the carburettors of all four engines. This caused a full loss of power in the inboard engines and partial loss in the outer; the captain of the Cavalier had reported icing problems prior to ditching. The inspector recommended that extra heating of carburetters and of the incoming air be provided and that a temperature indicator be installed. He also advised that passengers should be instructed in the fastening of lifebelts and the location of emergency exits and recommended the provision of extra life-saving equipment like rafts and pyrotechnic signals and that passengers should fasten safety belts at take-off and alighting.
