= North Hempstead Beach Park =

Beach in New York, United States

- Bar Beach Town Park (former); Hempstead Harbor County Park (former)
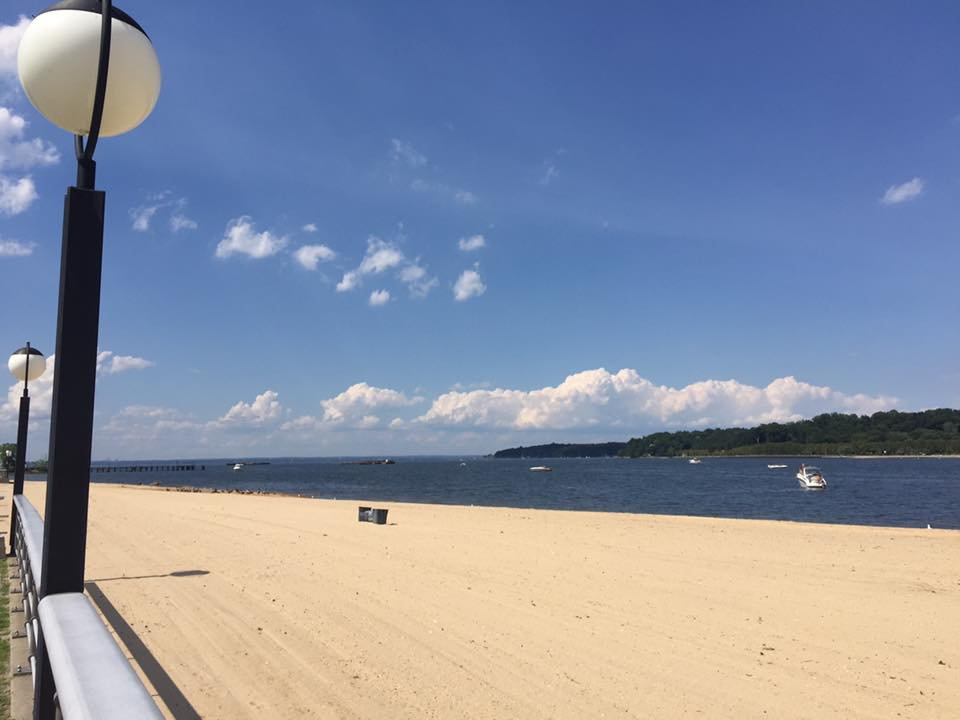
- The beachside promenade in 2016.
- Interactive map of North Hempstead Beach Park
- Type: Beach
- Location: Port Washington, New York, United States
- Coordinates: 40°49′40″N 73°39′10″W
- Area: 60 acres (24 ha)
- Owner: Town of North Hempstead
- Status: Open
- Website: Town of North Hempstead – North Hempstead Beach Park

North Hempstead Beach Park (officially known as Bar Beach and Hempstead Harbor Parks) is a beach located on Hempstead Harbor in Port Washington, in Nassau County, on the North Shore of Long Island, in New York, United States. It is located in and owned and operated by the Town of North Hempstead.

== Description ==
What is now North Hempstead Beach Park used to be two separate parks: Bar Beach Town Park (operated by the Town of North Hempstead) and Hempstead Harbor County Park (operated by Nassau County). The name was changed to its current name in 2008, following the Town's takeover. It is located off of West Shore Road (Nassau County Route 15), and is only accessible (with a fee) to residents of Nassau County. Bar Beach was historically also known as Barrow Beach.

In the 2000s (around late 2007), Nassau County transferred ownership of their portion of park space to the Town of North Hempstead. The transfer of ownership was performed as a cost-saving initiative by Nassau County.

After beginning renovations to this portion of the beach following the takeover, the Town of North Hempstead re-opened the entire property in the spring of 2008 as North Hempstead Beach Park.

The total area of the park is 60 acres (24 ha), and the total length of the property's beachfront is approximately .5 miles (0.80 km).

Amenities in the park include but are not limited to athletic fields (including little league baseball fields), an amphitheater, shuffleboard courts, the beach, the promenade, bathhouses, and boating and fishing facilities.

In the early 2020s, it was announced that the park will undergo a major renovation project.

=== Annual events ===
A fireworks display sometimes takes place at the beach on Memorial Day and for the Fourth of July.

In addition to the annual firework shows on Memorial Day and July 4, the beach is host to "Beachfest", an end of summer festival which is held each September. Beachfest features music, games, food vendors, and attractions for all ages.

== See also ==
- Manhasset Valley Park – Another former Nassau County park now operated by the Town of North Hempstead.
- Manorhaven Beach Park – Another waterfront park operated by the Town of North Hempstead, located in Manorhaven.
- Tappen Beach – Another beach on Hempstead Harbor, operated by the adjacent Town of Oyster Bay.
