= Cow Neck Peninsula =

Peninsula in Nassau County, New York

Coordinates: 40°50′25″N 73°41′13″W

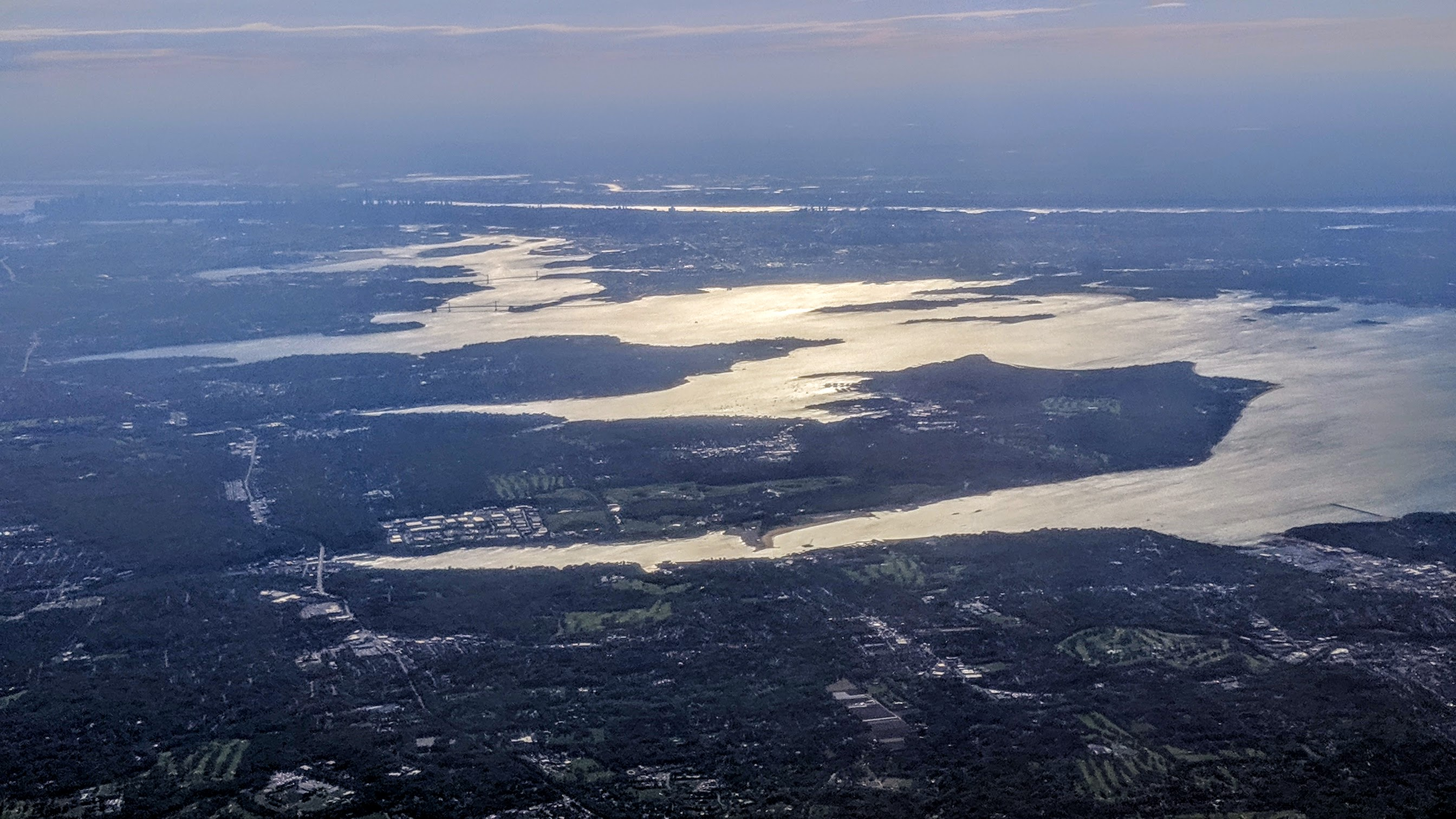
An aerial photo of the North Shore of Nassau County on Long Island, looking west. The Cow Neck Peninsula is visible as the first peninsula at the center, with Manhasset Bay immediately above it and Hempstead Harbor immediately below it.

The Cow Neck Peninsula is a peninsula in Nassau County, New York, on the North Shore of Long Island, in the United States. The Cow Neck Peninsula is also known as Manhasset Neck or simply as Cow Neck.

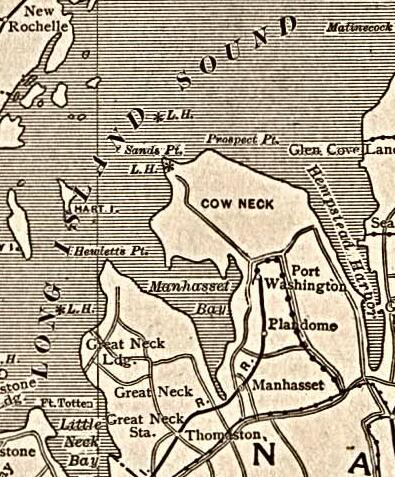
The peninsula, as seen on a map from 1917.

The Cow Neck Peninsula got its name in the 17th century, when it served as a common pasture. In the 19th century the peninsula became the site of country estates of the very rich, which in the 20th century with the growth of the Long Island Rail Road, gave way to affluent commuter suburbs.

Cow Neck was also famous for its sand mines along Hempstead Harbor throughout the 20th century. It is believed that 90% of the concrete that built the foundations of New York City came from the Port Washington sand mines, and that over 100 million tons of sand were shipped to Manhattan.

== Geography ==
On its west side, the Cow Neck Peninsula is bordered by Manhasset Bay. On its east side, it is bordered by Hempstead Harbor. To the north, it is bordered by the Long Island Sound. The peninsula's southern border is roughly defined as following Northern Boulevard (NY 25A) between Manhasset Bay to the west and Hempstead Harbor to the east.

Some places on the Cow Neck Peninsula – notably in Flower Hill and Manhasset – reach elevations high enough for the skyline of New York City to be seen from ground level.

== List of communities ==
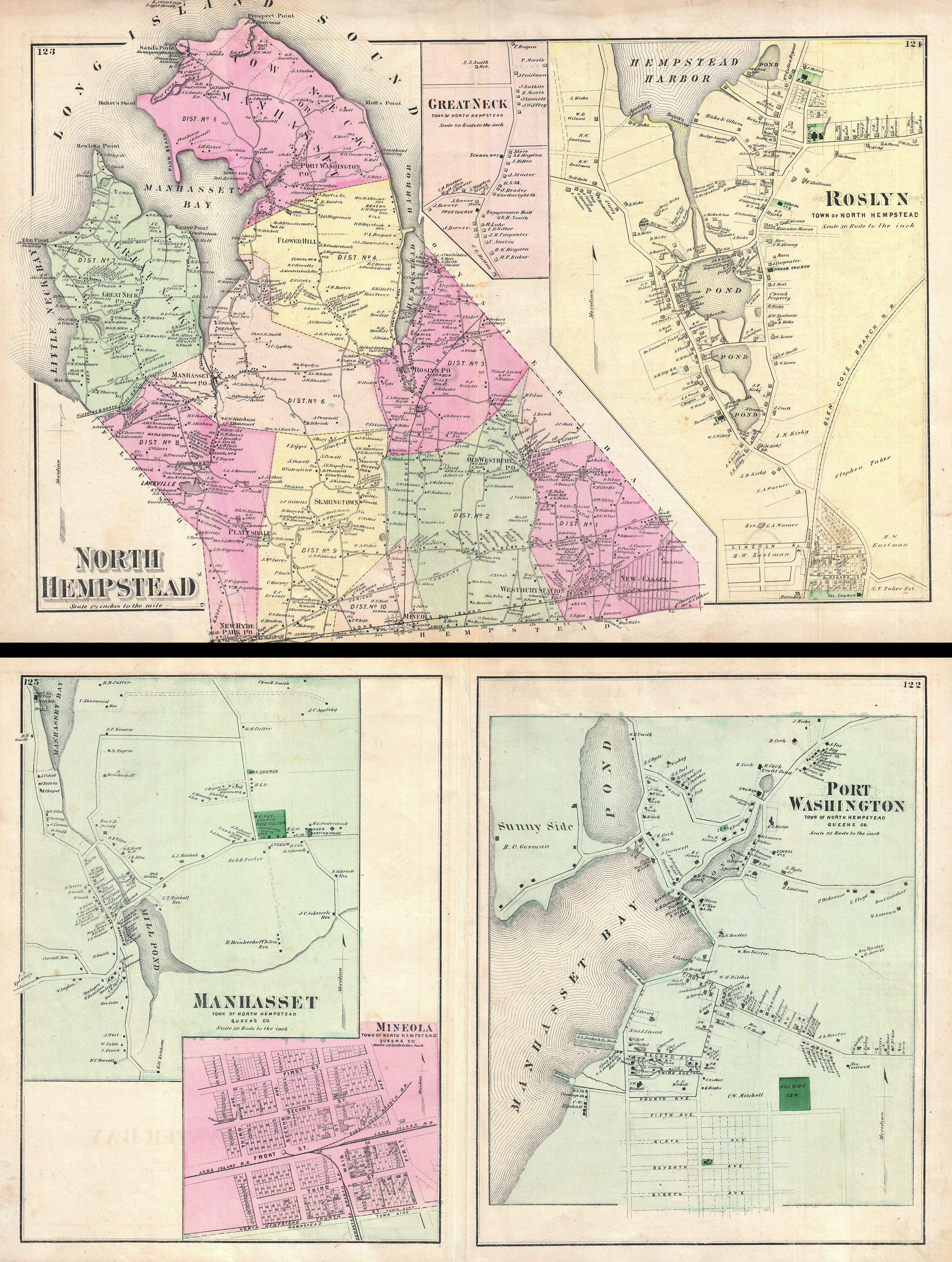
An 1873 Beers map, showing the Town of North Hempstead. The Cow Neck Peninsula is shown at top. Note that this map was made prior to the incorporation of many villages, and as such, certain villages are not shown on this map.

The following villages and hamlets are located on the Cow Neck Peninsula – either in part or in whole:

- Baxter Estates
- Flower Hill
- Manhasset
- Manorhaven
- Plandome
- Plandome Heights
- Plandome Manor
- Port Washington
- Port Washington North
- Sands Point

The Cow Neck Peninsula is located entirely within the Town of North Hempstead.
