= Hempstead Harbor =

Bay on north coast of Long Island, New York

- Hempstead Bay; Roslyn Harbor (informal)
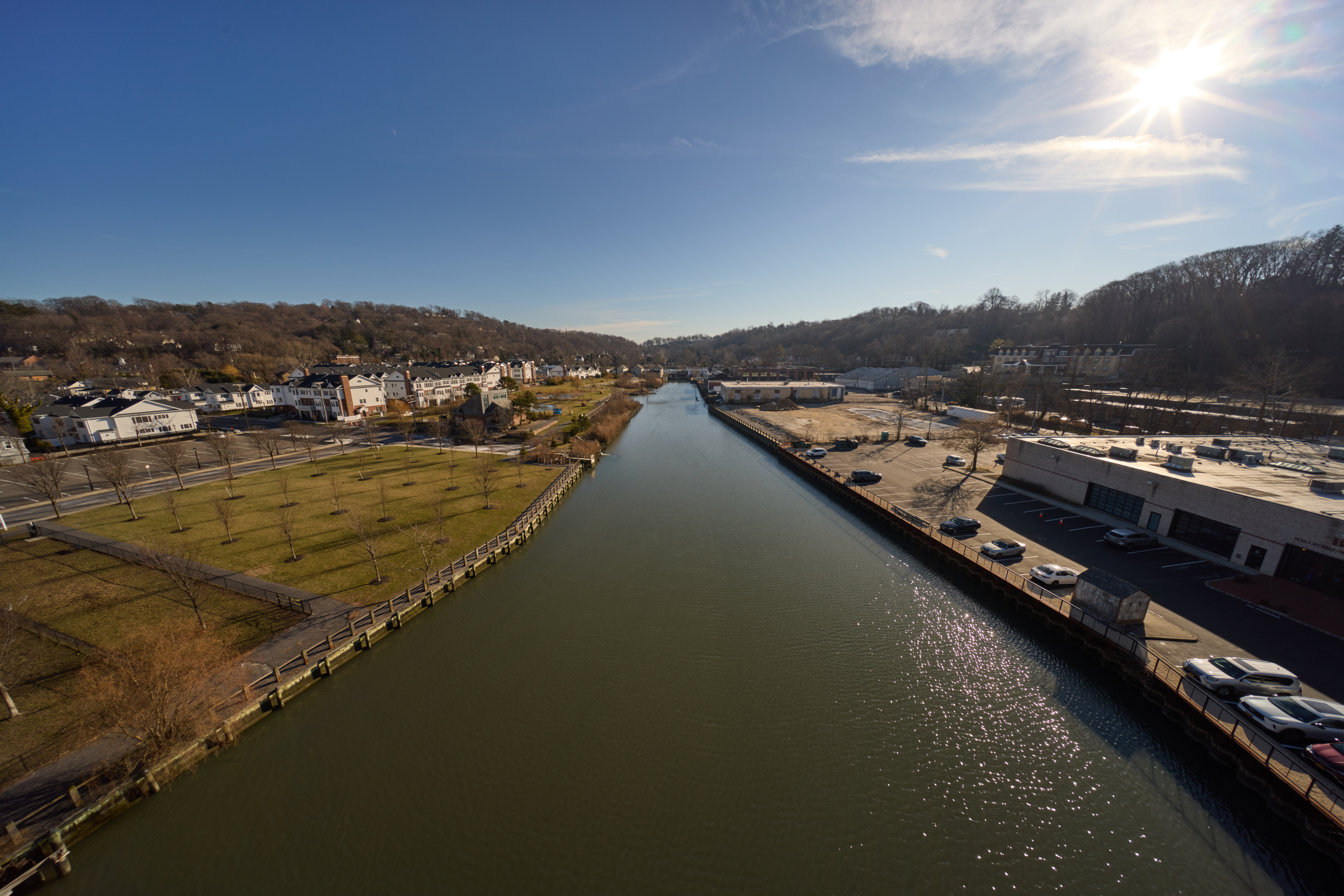
- Hempstead Harbor in Roslyn

- Location within Long Island Location within New York
- Location: Nassau County, New York
- Coordinates: 40°50′50″N 73°39′40″W
- Type: Bay, harbor
- Primary outflows: Long Island Sound

Hempstead Harbor (also known as Hempstead Bay and sometimes informally as Roslyn Harbor) is a bay hugging the northern coast of Long Island, in Nassau County, New York. Located off of the Long Island Sound, it forms the northernmost portion of the political boundary between the Nassau County towns of Oyster Bay on the east and North Hempstead on the west, as well as the western border of the city of Glen Cove with North Hempstead to its west.

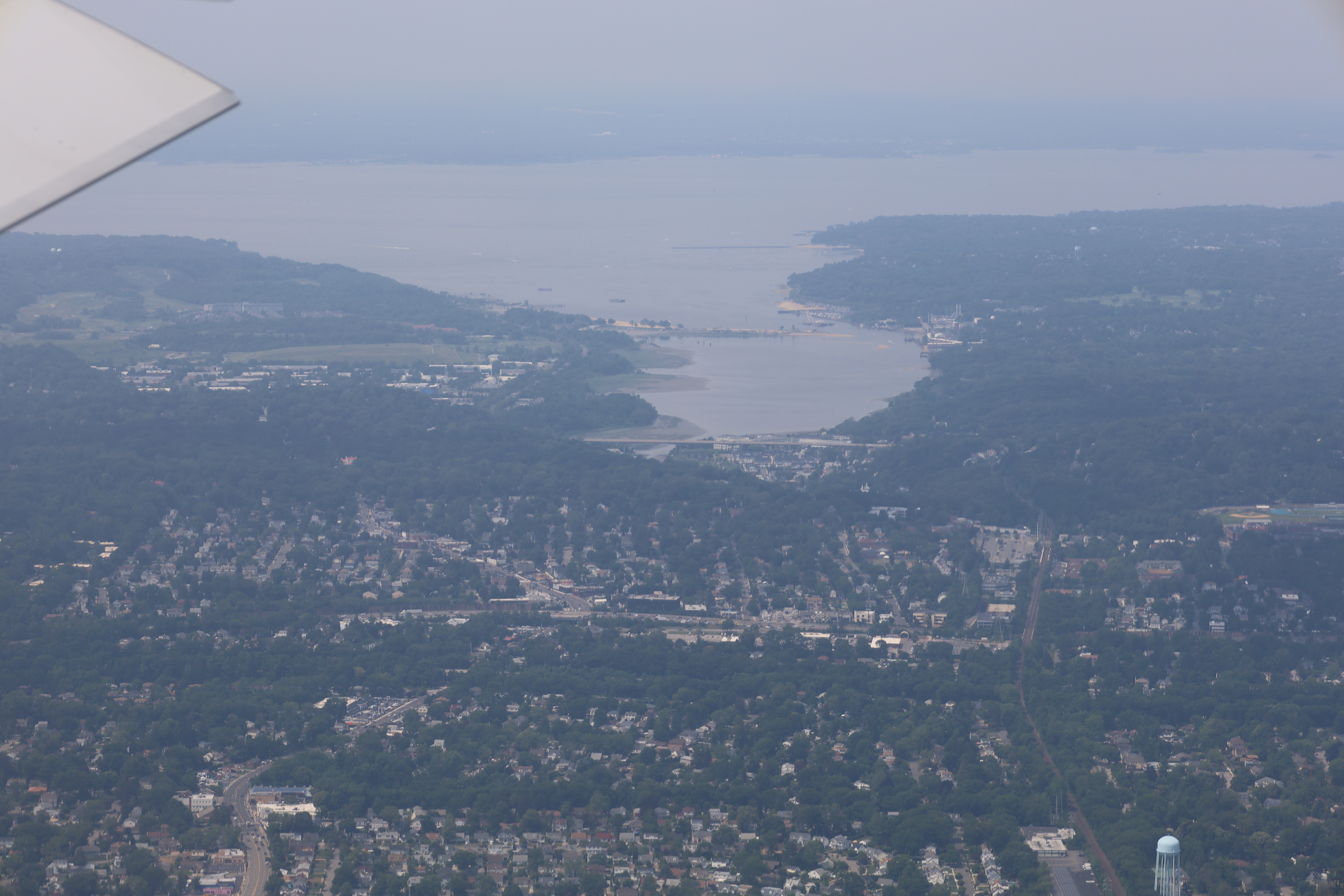
Aerial view of Hempstead Harbor (center) and the Cow Neck Peninsula (left) in 2021

== History ==
From the early days of colonization until the 20th century, many farms were located in the area (such as the Hewlett farm in Flower Hill, on the western shore of Hempstead Harbor). Goods produced in the area would be brought to the docks along the harbor in Roslyn (along with ports along Manhasset Bay in Manhasset and Port Washington), and from there, they would be shipped to destinations in New York City and beyond.

Before World War I, shacks were built on the marsh flats in the town-owned Hempstead Bay wetlands. They served as shelters for duck hunters, fishermen and weekend campers. Over time the summer cabins became cottages passed down through generations. Until 1970, folk singer Burl Ives spent occasional summer weekends in a cottage near the Hempstead Town Dock. Storms and erosion have taken their toll, and North Hempstead officials and conservationists came to consider them an intrusion. Ultimately, the Town stopped granting new leases in 1964.

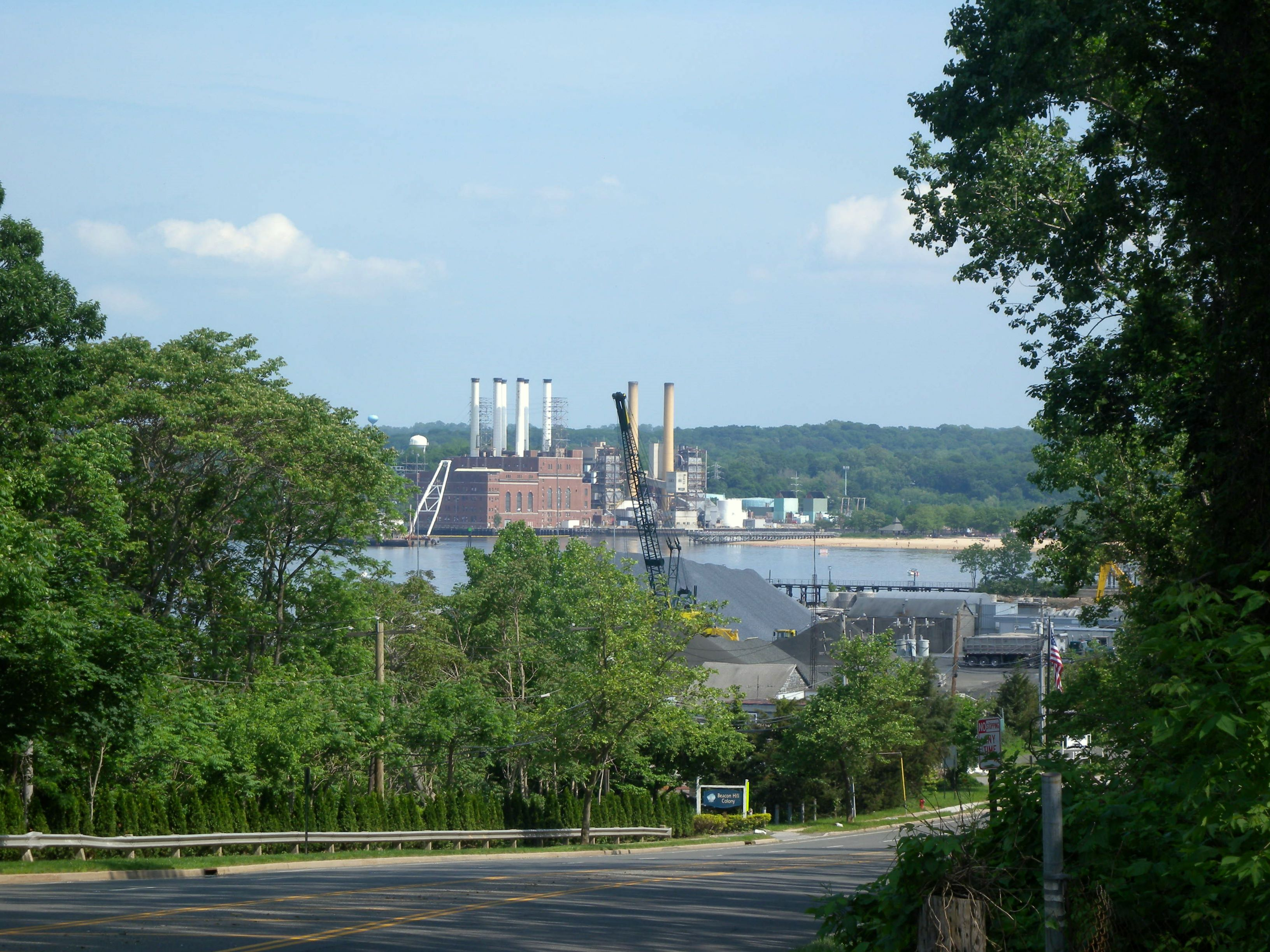
Hempstead Harbor, seen from West Shore Road in Port Washington, prior to the Glenwood Generating Station's demolition

Environmentalists have also long expressed concern over pollution in the harbor. One of the sources of this pollution came from sewage being directly released into the water from the former Roslyn Sewage Treatment Plant. This led to the creation of the Coalition to Save Hempstead Harbor in 1986. Then, in the 1990s, then-New York State Assemblyman Thomas DiNapoli and Ted Blackburn (the Mayor of Sea Cliff at the time) came up with the idea for the Hempstead Harbor Protection Committee. This organization was established in 1995.

=== Sand mining, 1865–1989 ===
From 1865 until 1989, the western shore of Hempstead Harbor, on Cow Neck, saw a significant amount of sand mining take place. The sand mined along the harbor would be used in the construction of much of New York City's infrastructure. The sand that was mined in the area would be brought to Hempstead Harbor, and from there would be shipped to destinations in New York City and points beyond.

By the time sand mining operations stopped in 1989, a total of 140,000,000 yards (130,000,000 m) of sand were minded along Hempstead Harbor.

== Parks and recreation ==
Notable parks and recreational facilities located along Hempstead Harbor/Hempstead Bay include:

- Bar Beach & Hempstead Harbor Parks – A recreational beach park owned by the Town of North Hempstead, on the west shore of the harbor in Port Washington, located immediately west and north of Bar Beach. The complex is also known as Bar Beach and North Hempstead Beach Park. A fireworks display takes place at the park every Memorial Day.
- Cedarmere – Located off Bryant Avenue in Roslyn Harbor, this Nassau County-owned preserve consists of the former estate of William Cullen Bryant.
- Tappen Beach – A beach owned by the Town of Oyster Bay. It is located off of Shore Road in Glenwood Landing, across the water from Bar Beach.

== Transportation ==
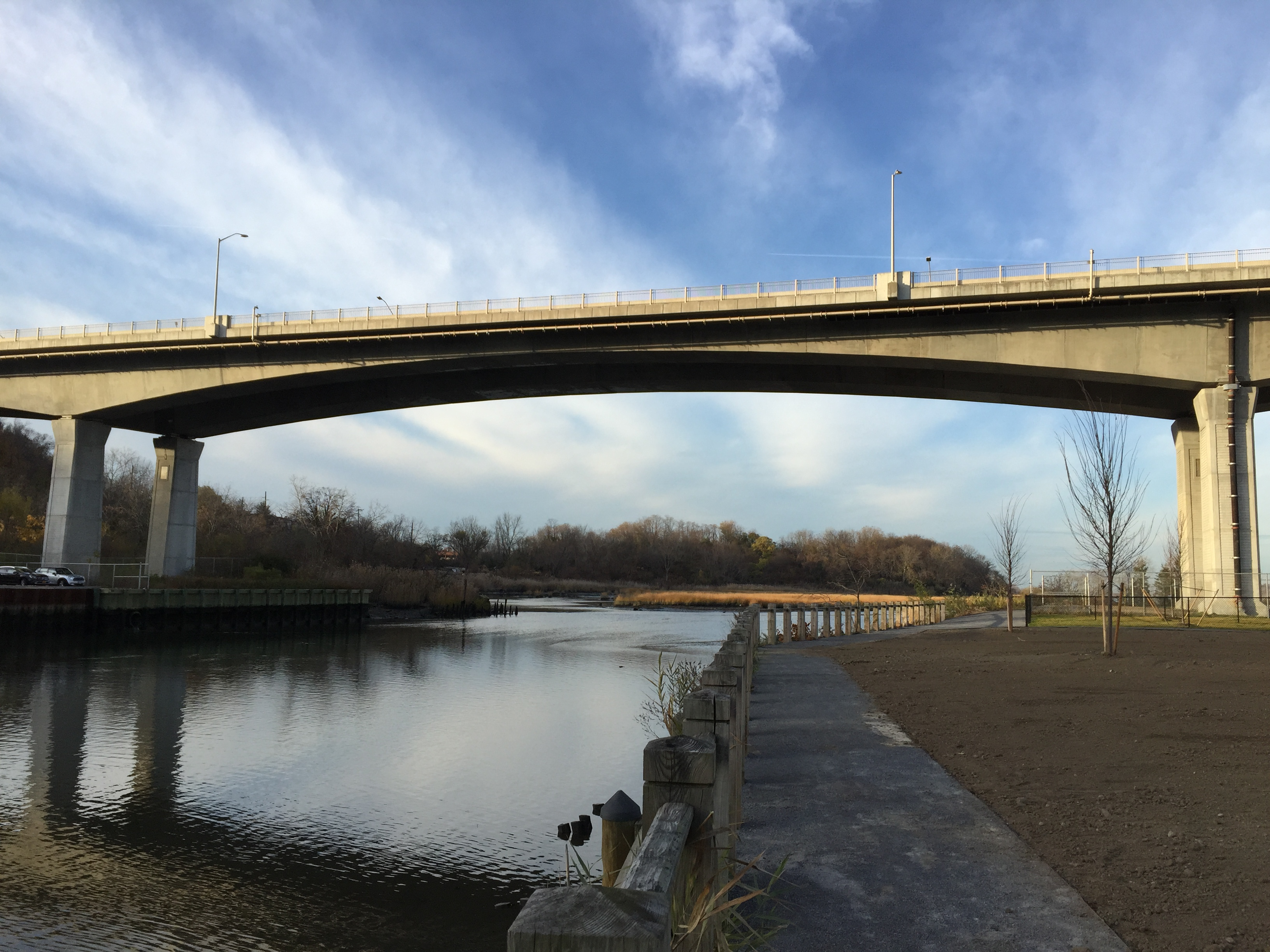
The William Cullen Bryant Viaduct's span over Hempstead Harbor in 2015

The William Cullen Bryant Viaduct (also known as the Roslyn Viaduct) crosses the southernmost section of Hempstead Harbor, carrying Northern Boulevard (NY 25A) between West Shore Road (CR 15) and Bryant Avenue at its eastern end. It serves as a bypass of Roslyn's downtown, and more specifically, Old Northern Boulevard – which had served as NY 25A's previous alignment through the Greater Roslyn area prior to the newer highway's construction.

The original bridge was opened by Governor Thomas E. Dewey in 1950. Between 2005 and 2012, this bridge was replaced at a cost of $127 million; the original bridge was structurally obsolete and in a state of disrepair.

== In popular culture ==
- The proposed United States Navy seaplane tender USS Hempstead (AVP-43) was named for Hempstead Bay, but the contract for the ship's construction was cancelled in 1943 before construction began.

== See also ==
- Glen Cove Creek – A channel in Glen Cove that flows into Hempstead Harbor.
- Cow Neck Peninsula
- Manhasset Bay

== Sources ==
- (ship namesake paragraph for AVP-43)
