= Manhasset Bay =

Bay of Long Island, New York, US

Coordinates: 40.829008°N 73.714571°W

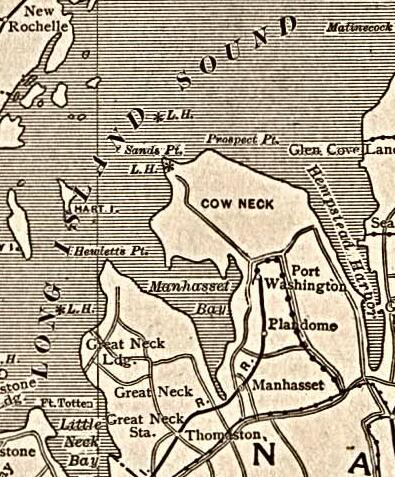
- Manhasset Bay, as seen on a map from 1917

- Location of Manhasset Bay in New York
- Location: Nassau County, New York, United States
- Type: Bay
- Primary outflows: Long Island Sound

Manhasset Bay (also known as Cow Bay) is an embayment in western Long Island, in New York, United States, off the Long Island Sound.

== Description ==
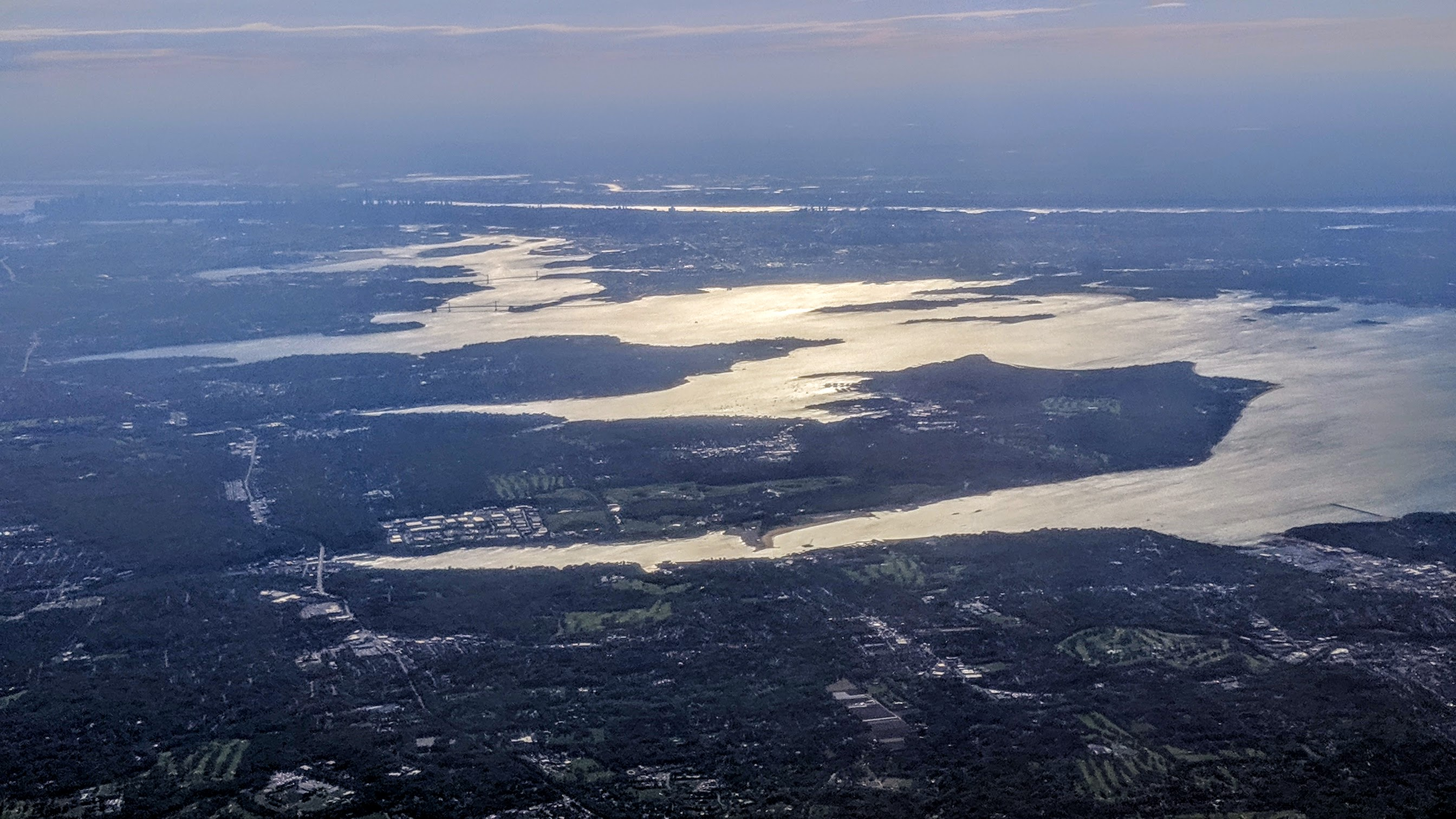
An aerial photo of the North Shore of Nassau County, looking west. Cow Neck is visible as the first peninsula at the center, with Manhasset Bay and Great Neck behind it and Hempstead Harbor in front of it.

Manhasset Bay forms the northeastern boundary of the Great Neck Peninsula and the southwestern boundary of the Cow Neck Peninsula (Port Washington Peninsula or Manhasset Neck), in Nassau County, New York. On the north side of the bay, there are three points, Barkers Point at the entrance, Plum Point coming the furthest into the Bay, and Tom's Point in the back bay. On the other side, Hewlett Point forms the entrance nearly a mile from Barkers Point. Hart Island lies in the Sound just outside the mouth of Manhasset Bay.

The Manhasset Bay area was likely first inhabited in the 17th century by the Matinecock tribe of Algonquin Indians. However, that view has been challenged. Then the Dutch and the English settled around the bay in the 17th century because of the proximity of fish. The Bay was called Schout's Bay by the Dutch, and then Howe's Bay by the English. Subsequently, due to the presence of cattle raising, it came to be called Cow Bay, and the local neck, to the northeast, "Cow Neck". It finally became Manhasset Bay in 1907.

During the 1910s and 1920s – during the height of the Gilded Age, a large development, to be known as New Versailles, was planned to be built on the eastern shore of Manhasset Bay, on land now split between Port Washington and the Village of Plandome Manor. New Versailles was ultimately cancelled due to financial constraints resulting from World War I and the Great Depression. Much of the site was ultimately developed as the Manhasset Bay Estates neighborhood of Port Washington.

The 1920s also saw the bay begin to switch from the cow-and-fish industry to support services for commercial boating, as it is considered to be one of the best harbors on Long Island Sound with little tidal current except at the entrance and average tidal displacement of only six feet. By the 1980s it was full of marinas and yacht clubs. The Sands Point Seaplane Base on Manhasset Bay was at one time the main airport for passenger service between New York and Europe. At the beginning of the 21st century, it had about 16% of all the marinas and yacht clubs in the whole of Long Island Sound.

== Sub-watersheds ==
Manhasset Bay's watershed consists of many smaller sub-water sheds. These sub-watersheds are:

- Barkers Point
- Baxter and Mill Pond
- Eastern Shore
- Kings Point Pond
- Leeds Pond
- Mitchell Creek
- Sheets Creek
- Southeastern Shore
- Southwestern Shore
- Toms and Plum Points
- Whitney Pond

== Gallery ==
Manhasset Bay

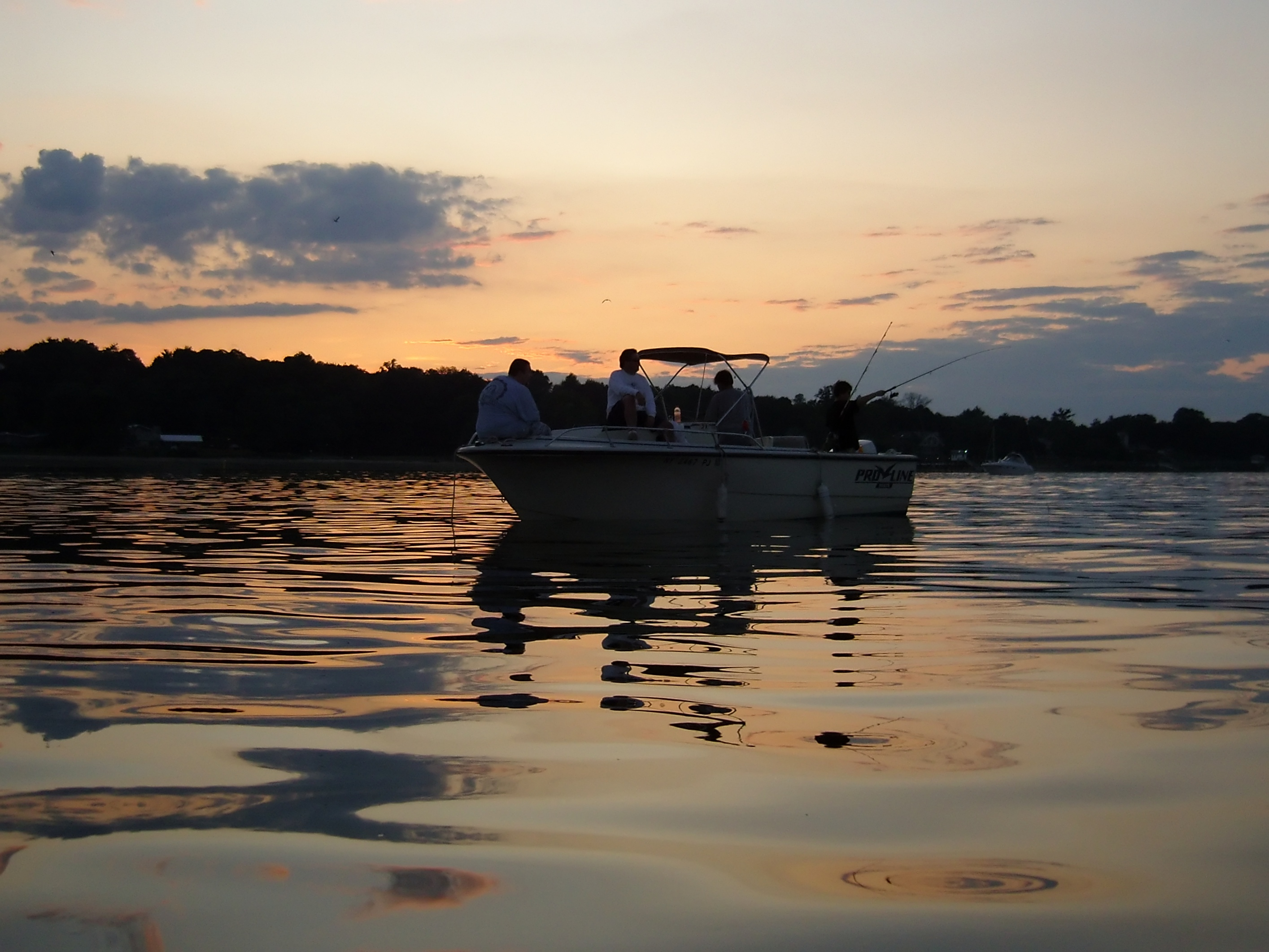

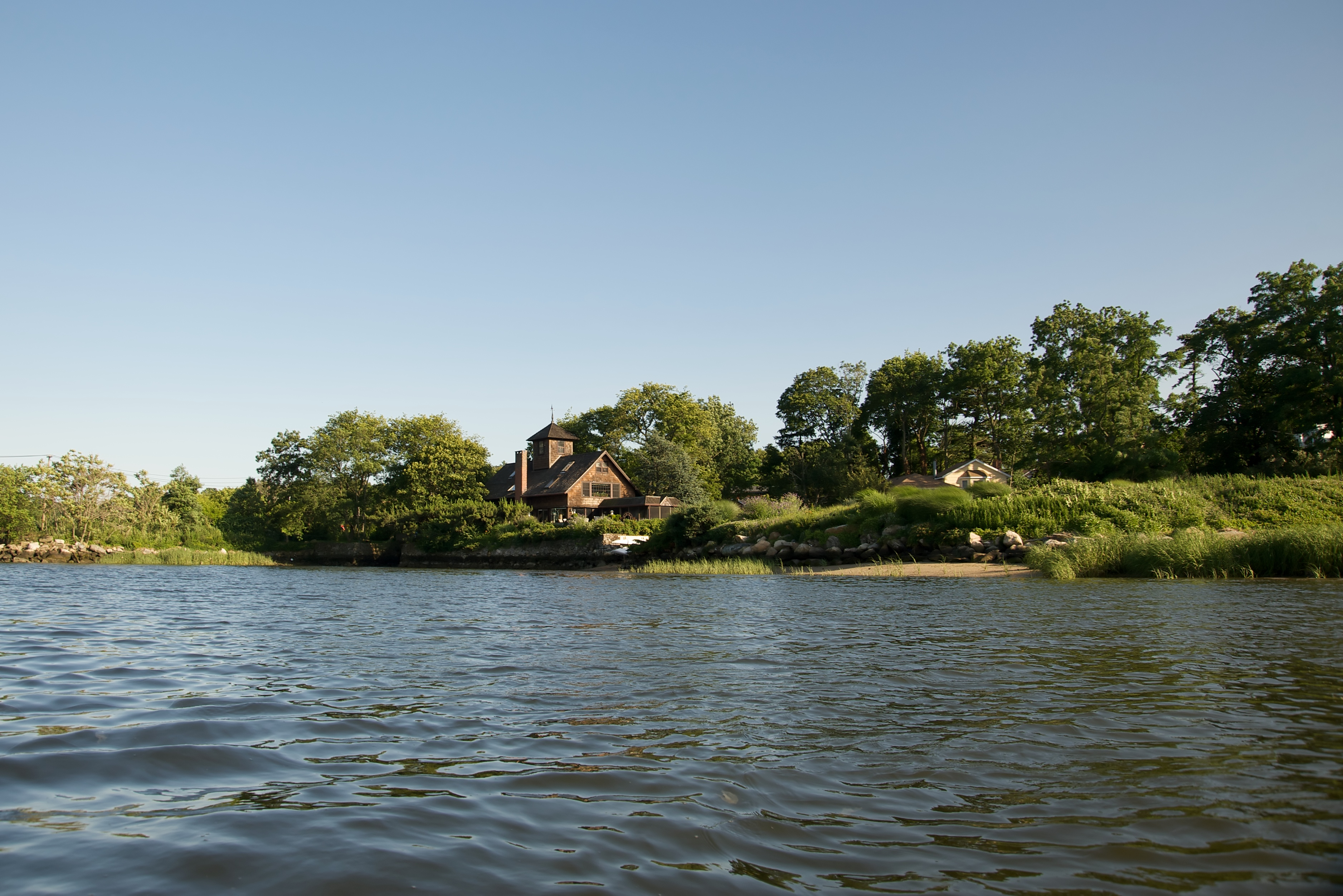

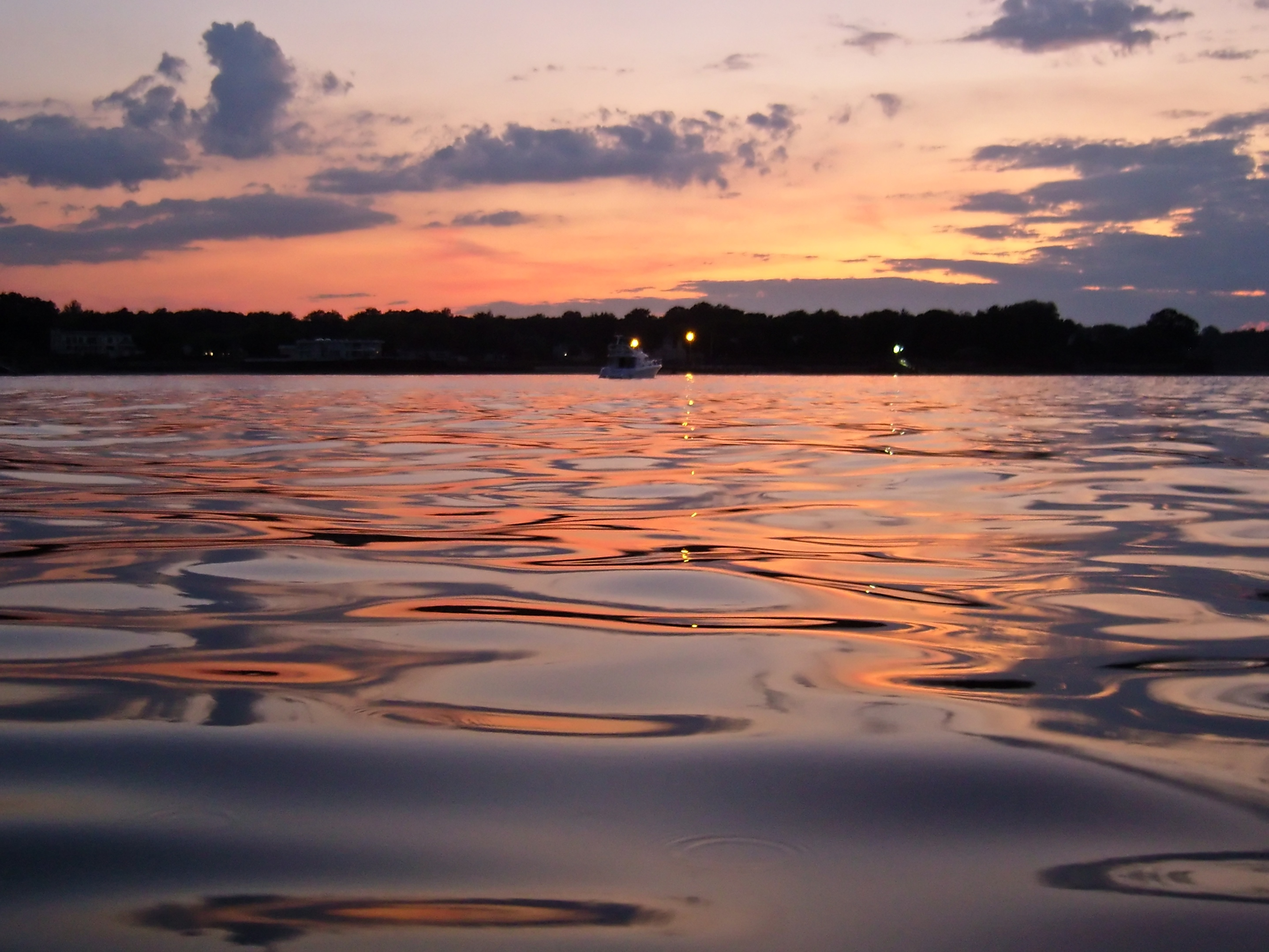

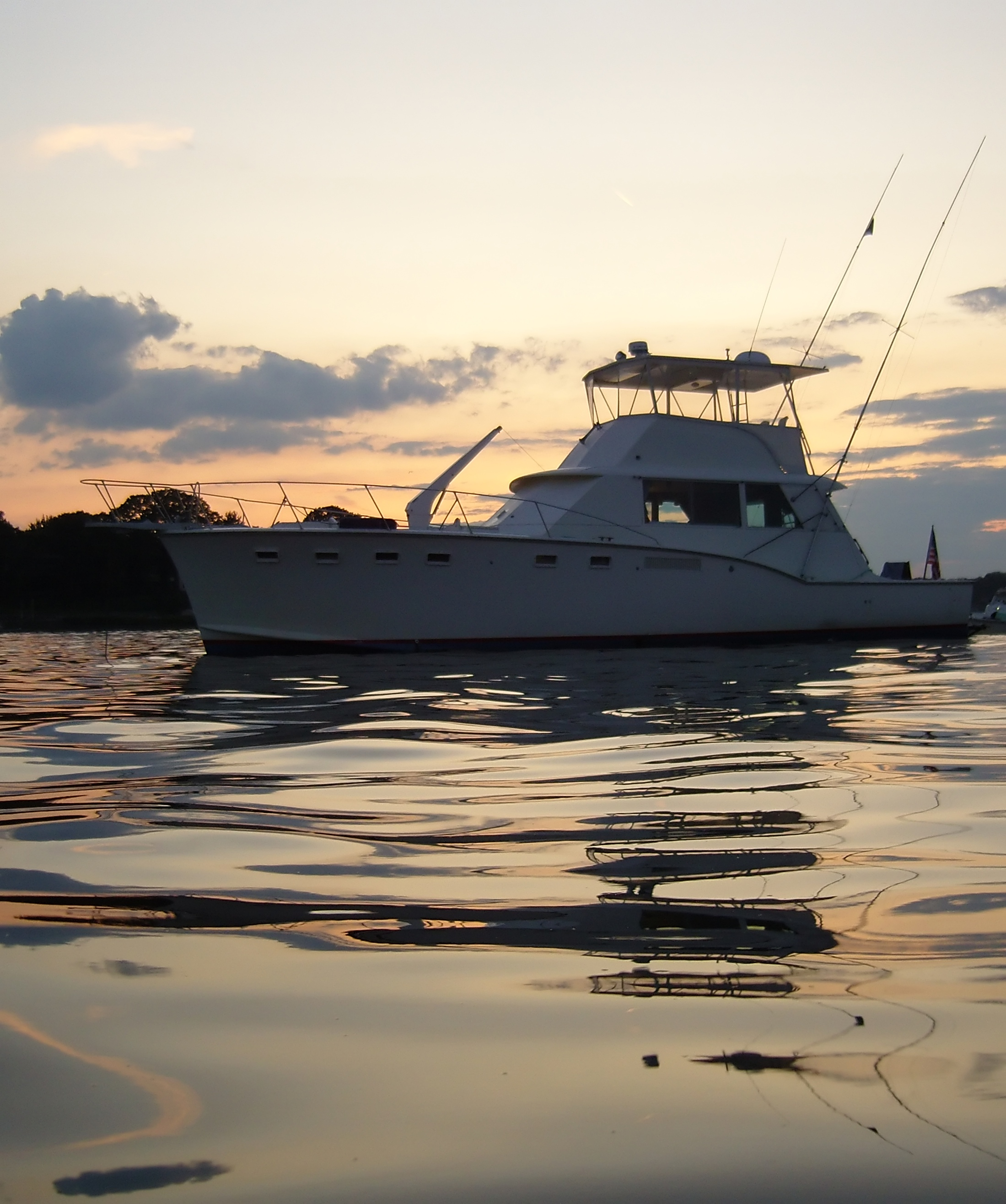

== See also ==
- USS Manhasset
- Hempstead Harbor
- Little Neck Bay
