= Merriman Park (Port Washington, New York) =

Park in Port Washington, Nassau County, New York

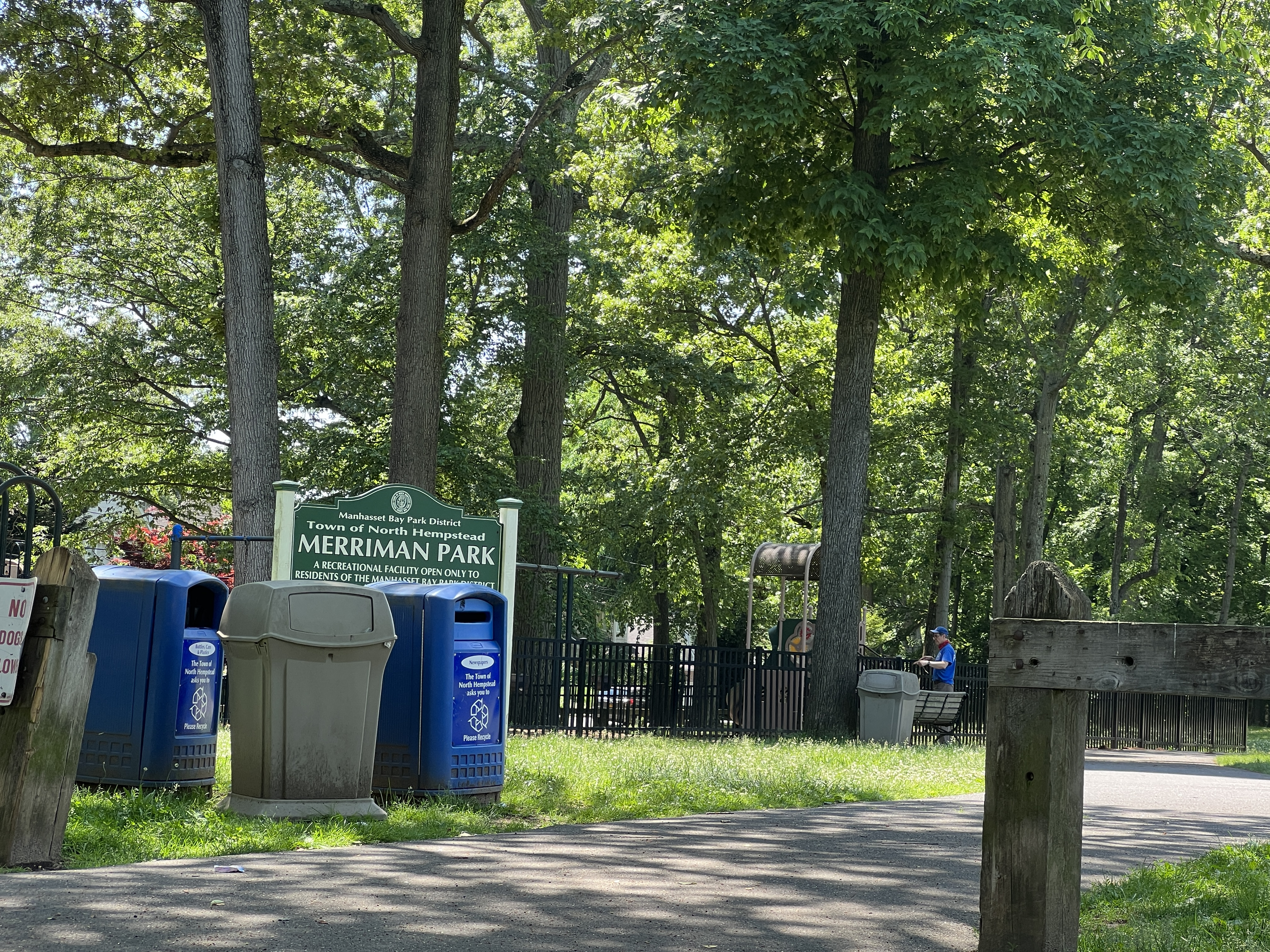
- Merriman Park in 2022
- Interactive map of Merriman Park
- Type: Neighborhood park
- Location: 73 Feinmore Road, Port Washington, NY, United States
- Coordinates: 40°49′15.8″N 73°41′26.3″W
- Area: 3.5 acres (1.4 ha)
- Opened: 1980
- Owner: Manhasset Bay Park District (Town of North Hempstead)
- Operator: Manhasset Bay Park District
- Status: Open
- Website: Town of North Hempstead – Merriman Park

Merriman Park (also known as Merriman Town Park, Charlotte E. Merriman Park, Manhasset Bay Estates Park, and Pine Street Park) is a 3.5-acre (1.4 ha) park in the Manhasset Bay Estates neighborhood of Port Washington, in Nassau County, New York, United States. It is owned by the Town of North Hempstead and is operated by the town through Manhasset Bay Park District – a special district serving the Manhasset Bay Estates neighborhood of the hamlet.

== Description ==
Merriman Park was built on the former site of the Port Washington Union Free School District's Merriman School. It is open solely to residents of the Manhasset Bay Park District and, in turn, the residents of Port Washington's Manhasset Bay Estates neighborhood.

As of 2025, the park features a playground, a baseball field, basketball courts, walking paths, gaga ball facilities, and ample green space.

== History ==
=== Merriman School, 1952–1977 ===
What is now Merriman Park was formerly the site of the Port Washington Union Free School District's Merriman School, located within Manhasset Bay Estates. Designed by Eggers & Higgins, this school – like the park that replaced it – was named for Charlotte E. Merriman, a former principal at the nearby Main Street School. It was built between 1950 and 1952 – about the same time as the district's South Salem Elementary School further southwest and Manorhaven Elementary School further north.

In the late 1970s, after determining that the school was obsolete, the Port Washington Board of Education voted to close the Merriman School at the end of the 1976–1977 school year; the school closed in June 1977, and all students were subsequently transferred to other elementary schools within the district starting that fall.

==== Post-closure, 1977–1979 ====
In January 1978, the school district declared that the school was excess property, and school district residents voted to sell the property in 1979 for use as a park.

In 1979 – and as a result of the sale, the school district did not renew the Port Washington Children's Center's lease of the Merriman School, which had occupied the former school since 1977. Subsequently, the center would move to other locations in the community before ultimately relocating to the former Main Street School downtown.

=== Merriman Park, 1980–present ===
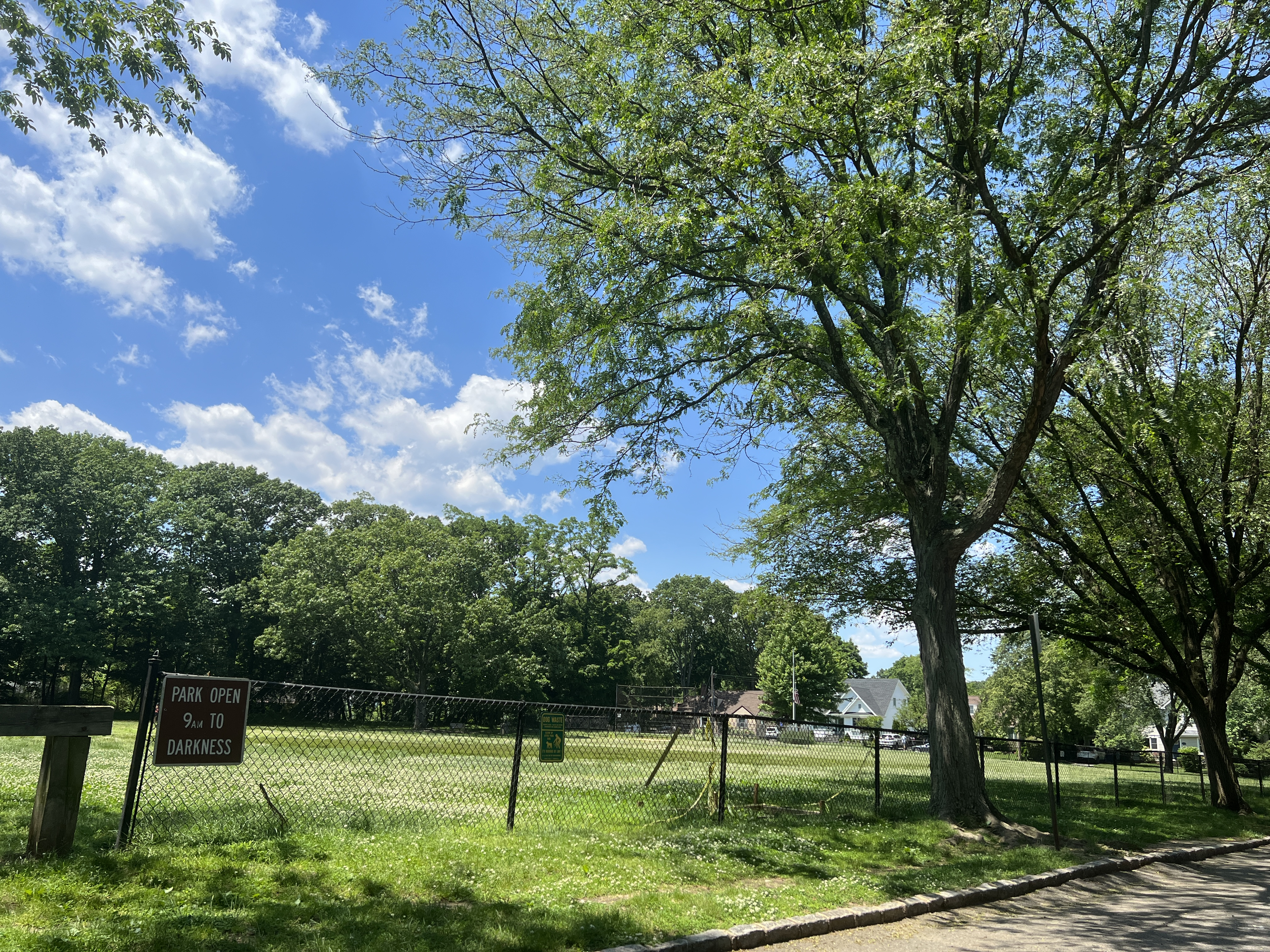
The field at Merriman Park in 2022

With the 1979 vote resulting in the approval of the sale of the property for use as a park, the Town of North Hempstead, through the Manhasset Bay Park District – a newly-formed special district created by the town, purchased the Merriman School for roughly $200,000. The town further announced its intention to demolish the school and convert it into a park for residents of that new special district. This vote was contentious, with a large debate ensuing over whether the park district should be given the land, or if it should instead be given to the highest bidder. Nevertheless, the majority of voters approved of the sale to the Manhasset Bay Park District, thereby ensuring that the property would be reused for the park.

The town's decision to buy the land and convert it into a park – and to create the special district – was spurred in large part by pressure from the Manhasset Bay Civic Association and the requests of several residents of the neighborhood, who vocally advocated to build a park on the land and preserve the open space, instead of the property being subdivided for new houses. The new special district would solely include the Manhasset Bay Estates neighborhood, and its residents would pay off the debts from the project through property taxes and bonds; this – combined with the district's small size and population – further spurred the decision to demolish the building, so to prevent an undue tax burden on park district residents caused by the amount of money that would be required to insure and maintain the structure.

After the Town of North Hempstead finalized the plans for Merriman Park, it demolished the building in 1980, and constructed the park in its place.

Merriman Park ultimately opened in 1980.

== Manhasset Bay Park District ==
Manhasset Bay Park District

Agency overview
- Formed: 1979
- Type: Park district
- Status: Active
- Parent agency: Town of North Hempstead

The Manhasset Bay Park District (also known as the Manhasset Bay Estates Park District and the Merriman Park District, and abbreviated as MBPD) is a special district within – and governed by – the Town of North Hempstead, which covers the Manhasset Bay Estates neighborhood of Port Washington – along with a portion of the Plandome Country Club in the Village of Plandome Manor – in Nassau County, New York, United States.

=== Overview ===
The Manhasset Bay Park District was established by the Town of North Hempstead in 1979. It was created in order to build, own, and manage Merriman Park – a new park which would be constructed on the site of the Port Washington Union Free School District's Merriman School.

The special district's boundaries include all of the Manhasset Bay Estates neighborhood in Port Washington, along with portions of the Plandome Country Club in the Village of Plandome Manor.

== See also ==
- Manorhaven Beach Park
- North Hempstead Beach Park
- Main Street School
- Paul D. Schreiber Senior High School
- Special districts in New York (state)
