= United States Post Office (Port Washington, New York) =

Port Washington Post Office
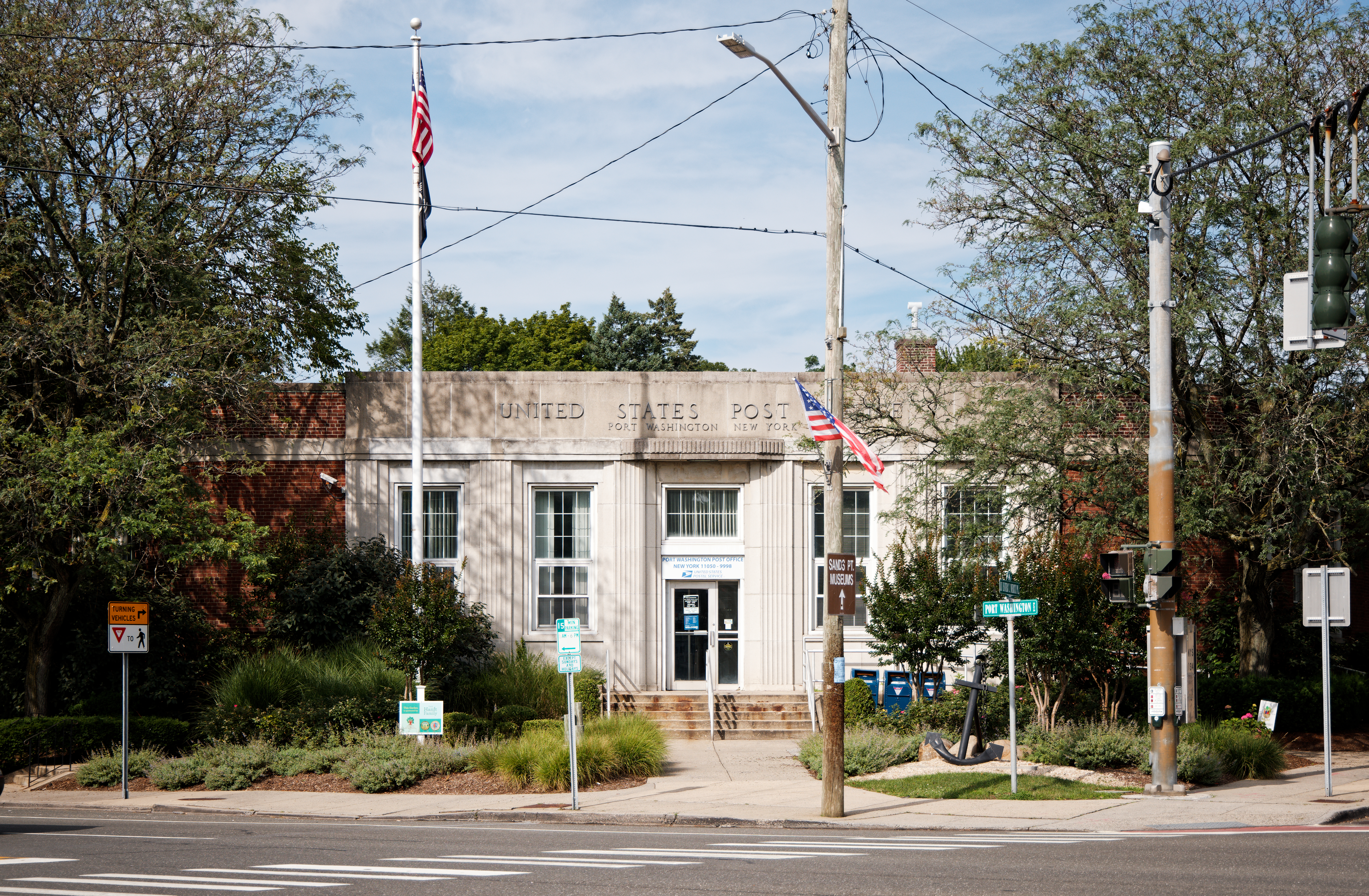
- The Port Washington Post Office in 2023
- Interactive map of the Port Washington Post Office area

General information
- Architectural style: Arte Moderne; Neoclassical
- Location: 1501 Port Washington Blvd., Port Washington, New York 11050
- Coordinates: 40°49′51.7″N 73°41′02.4″W
- Construction started: 1934
- Completed: 1935
- Cost: $65,300
- Owner: United States Postal Service

Design and construction
- Architect: Frank T. Cornell
- Main contractor: A. J. Paretta Contracting Co. Inc.

U.S. Post Office-Port Washington is a historic post office building located in Port Washington, in the Town of North Hempstead, Nassau County, New York, United States.

== Description ==
The 1-story, trapezoid-shaped post office building, designed in the Arte Moderne & Neoclassical architectural styles, was built in 1935 as part of a massive Depression-era Public Works Administration project that built many new post offices & other public buildings throughout the state of New York. It is eligible for listing on the National Register of Historic Places.

It was announced that PWA allotments were made for the post office's erection circa 1933, when it was announced that $65,300 (1933 USD) had been allocated for its construction – part of a $502,430 project to erect several post offices in Nassau and Suffolk Counties.

Construction began on the building in 1934 and was completed the following year. It was designed by Port Washington-based architect Frank T. Cornell, who had previously designed other prominent civic buildings in the area – including the Main Street School and extensions to North Hempstead Town Hall. The contract for the building's construction was awarded by the Federal Government to A. J. Paretta Contracting Co. Inc.

== New Deal artwork ==
As was common for New Deal-era post offices, three murals – also commissioned by the Federal Government, through the Treasury Relief Art Project – were installed in the post office. Titled Lighthouse, Sailing, and Landscape, these three murals were installed in the lobby and were created by artist Harry S. Lane.

Additional New Deal artwork by Paul Cadmus, titled Pocahontas and John Smith, was installed in the post office in 2918.

== See also ==
- United States Post Office (Great Neck, New York)
- United States Post Office (Mineola, New York)
- New Deal artwork
- List of New Deal murals
