= Carrie Palmer Weber Middle School =

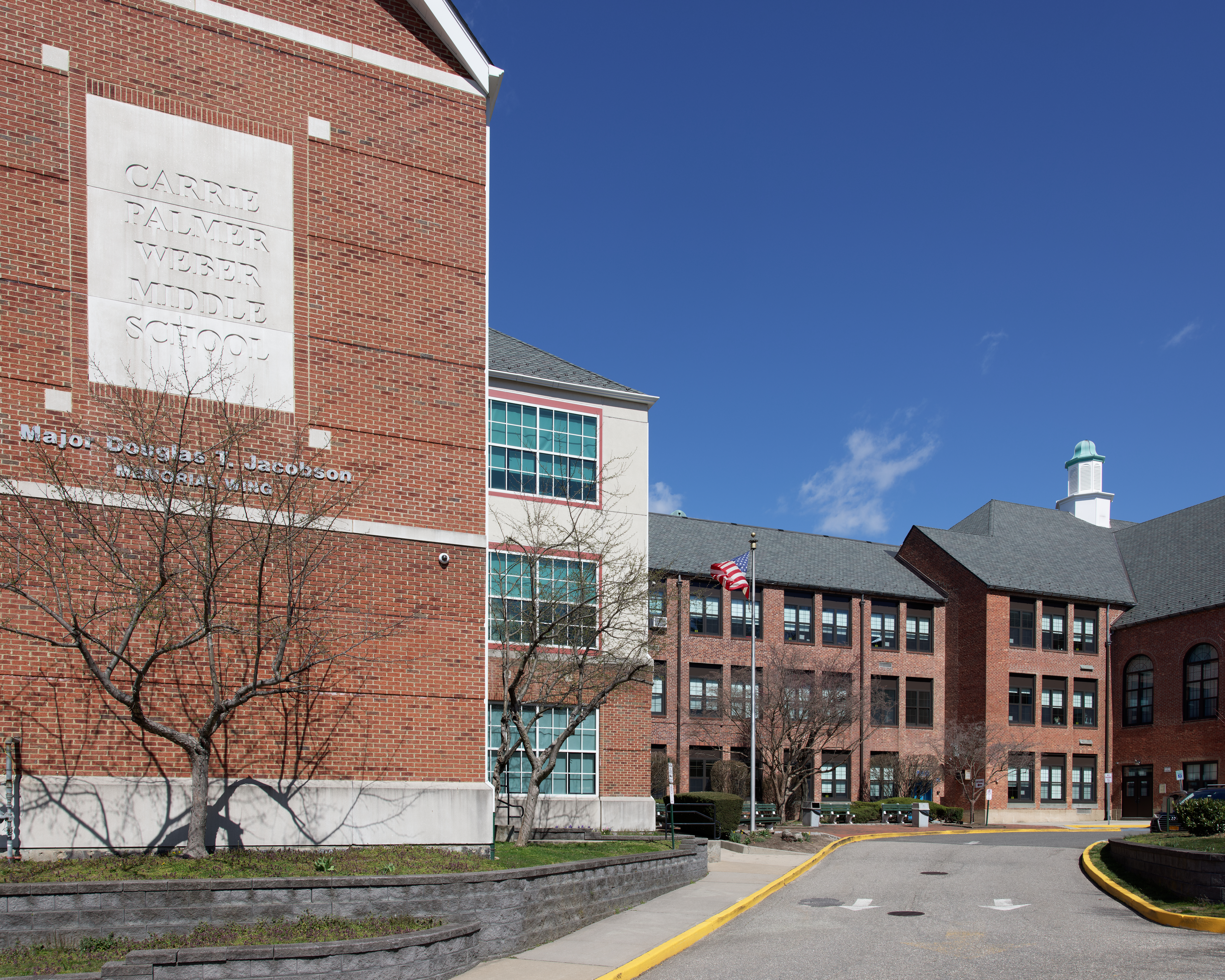
- Weber Middle School in 2024

Location
- 52 Campus Drive; Port Washington, Nassau County, New York 11050; United States
- 40°49′42.6″N 73°41′00.2″W

Information
- Type: Public middle school
- Established: 1929 (as a high school); 1953 (as a middle school)
- Closed: 1953 (as a high school)
- School district: Port Washington Union Free School District
- NCES School ID: 362358003288
- Principal: Beth Javeline
- Faculty: 111.84 FTEs
- Grades: 6–8
- Enrollment: 1,218 (2023–24)
- Student to teacher ratio: 10.89-to-1
- Colors: Royal Blue and White
- Team name: Vikings
- Website: web.portnet.org

Carrie Palmer Weber Middle School (also known as Weber Middle School or simply Weber – and formerly as Port Washington High School and thence Port Washington Junior High School and Carrie Palmer Weber Junior High School) is a public middle school and former high school operated by the Port Washington Union Free School District, located in Port Washington, Nassau County, New York, United States.

== History ==
=== Port Washington High School, 1929–1953 ===
In 1927, citing growing educational needs in the Port Washington community, the Port Washington Union Free School District proposed building a new high school and converting the Main Street School into an elementary school. That same year, residents of the district approved of the plans.

In 1929, approximately two years after residents approved constructing Port Washington High School, the construction was completed and the school opened. This school building would be built adjacent to the district's Flower Hill School.

In 1953, to further improve the community's growing needs, the district replaced Port Washington High School with a new senior high school, in turn reusing the 1929-built school as a junior high school. The new high school, known as Paul D. Schreiber Senior High School, would be constructed adjacent to this 1929-built facility.

=== Carrie Palmer Weber Middle School, 1953–present ===
After the opening of Schreiber High School, the school district converted Port Washington High School into Port Washington Junior High School. In 1958, it would be renamed Carrie Palmer Weber Junior High School, in honor of Carrie Palmer Weber – a former math teacher who worked in the building when it was still used as a high school; Weber began working as a teacher in the district in 1926, starting as a fourth grade teacher at the former Sands Point School.

In 1993, several years after the closure of the Flower Hill School, the Port Washington UFSD proposed a major grade restructuring of its schools. This included turning Weber into a middle school and connecting the Flower Hill School to it, for use by middle school classes. By 1995, the conversion of Weber into a middle school – and the repurposing the Flower Hill School to become part of it and connected thereto via a breezeway – had been completed. In September 1996, Weber welcomed its first class of sixth graders.

A three-story complex housing classrooms and an administrative office was constructed on the westernmost end of the property and opened for the 2005–06 school year. This expanded section of the school was named after Major Douglas T. Jacobson, a United States Marine and Medal of Honor recipient who grew up in Port Washington. To address temporary space constraints, several portable building classrooms were installed in 2000 and connected to the former Flower Hill School section of the middle school; these were later repurposed exclusively for music rooms and a fitness area. The wood portables were demolished in early 2019 and replaced with a brick, single-story breezeway known as the "Cultural Arts Wing", which opened in February 2021. The new extension to the existing building continues to house music classrooms and a fitness room.

As of 2026, Weber Middle School continues to operate as the district's sole middle school, handling all students in grades six through eight.

== Demographics ==
As of the 2023–24 school year, Weber Middle School had a total of 1,218 enrolled students in grades six through eight, along with approximately 111.84 full-time equivalent faculty members. This made for a student-to-teacher ratio of approximately 10.89-to-1.

== See also ==
- Paul D. Schreiber Senior High School
- Main Street School
- Berner Middle School – another former high school, located in nearby Massapequa, New York, that now serves as a middle school
