= United States Post Office (Great Neck, New York) =

- US Post Office-Great Neck
- U.S. National Register of Historic Places
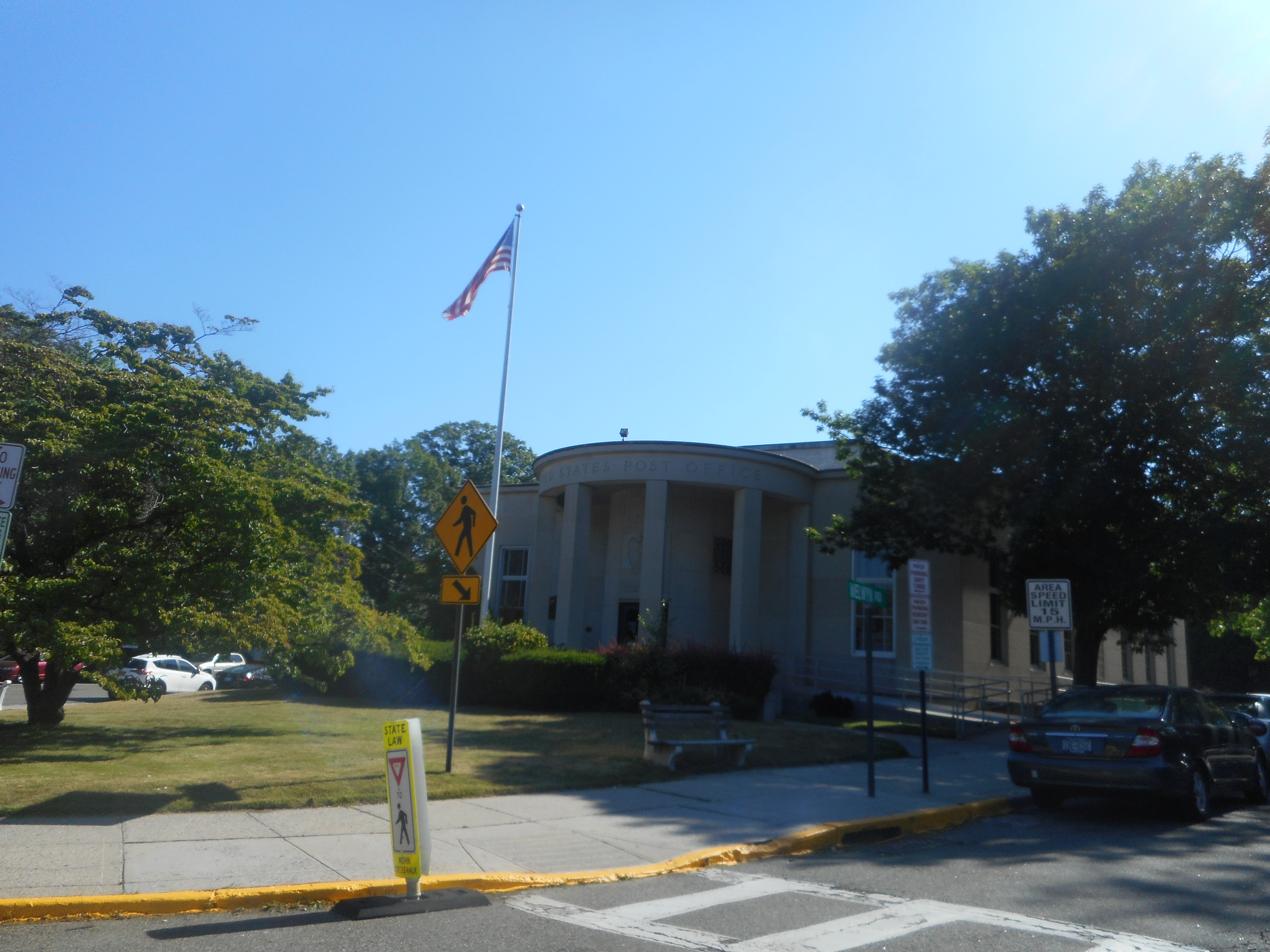
- The post office as seen from Welwyn Road

- Location within New York Location within the United States
- Location: 1 Welwyn Rd., Great Neck Plaza, New York
- Coordinates: 40°47′14″N 73°43′23″W
- Area: less than one acre
- Built: 1939
- Architect: Foster, William Dewey; Cecere, Gaetano
- Architectural style: Classical Revival
- MPS: US Post Offices in New York State, 1858-1943, TR
- NRHP reference No.: 88002526
- Added to NRHP: May 11, 1989

US Post Office-Great Neck (also known as the Great Neck Post Office) is a historic post office building located within the Incorporated Village of Great Neck Plaza in the Town of North Hempstead, in Nassau County, New York, United States.

== Description ==
The Great Neck Post Office was built in 1939 and designed by consulting architect William Dewey Foster (1890-1958) for the Office of the Supervising Architect. It is a one-story, pentagonal shaped skeletal frame building clad with plucked textured buff limestone in the Classical Revival style. It features a semicircular entrance portico supported by four square columns. Above the entrance is a relief sculpture of an eagle with 13 stars sculpted in 1940 by Gaetano Cecere.

It was listed on the National Register of Historic Places in 1989. It was designated as a local historical landmark on December 1, 2004.

== See also ==
- United States Post Office (Port Washington, New York)
- United States Post Office (Mineola, New York)
