= Great Neck Plaza, New York =

- Village
- Incorporated Village of Great Neck Plaza
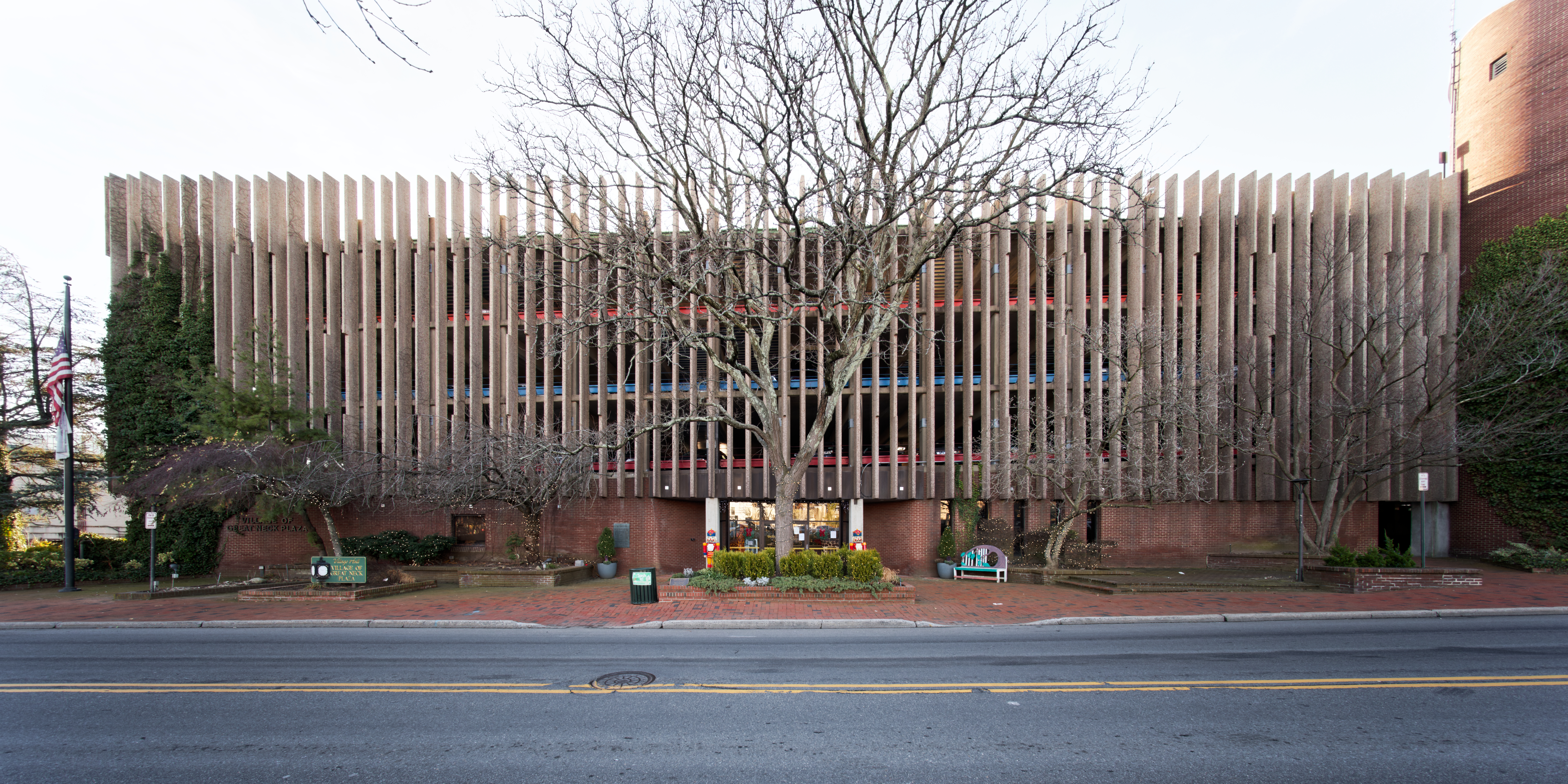
- Great Neck Plaza Village Hall (2022)

- logo

- Location in Nassau County and the state of New York

- Location on Long Island Location within the state of New York
- Coordinates: 40°47′13″N 73°43′33″W
- Country: United States
- State: New York
- County: Nassau County
- Town: North Hempstead
- Incorporated: May 3, 1930

Government
  - Mayor: Ted Rosen
  - Deputy Mayors: Pamela Marksheid; Gerald Schneiderman

Area
  - Total: 0.31 sq mi (0.81 km^{2})
  - Land: 0.31 sq mi (0.81 km^{2})
  - Water: 0 sq mi (0.00 km^{2})
- Elevation: 92 ft (28 m)

Population (2020)
  - Total: 7,482
  - Density: 24,026/sq mi (9,276.4/km^{2})
- Time zone: UTC-5 (Eastern (EST))
  - Summer (DST): UTC-4 (EDT)
- ZIP Code: 11021
- Area codes: 516, 363
- FIPS code: 36-30213
- GNIS feature ID: 0951642
- Website: www.greatneckplaza.net

Great Neck Plaza is a village on the Great Neck Peninsula in the Town of North Hempstead, in Nassau County, on the North Shore of Long Island, in New York, United States. The population was 7,482 at the time of the 2020 census.

== History ==
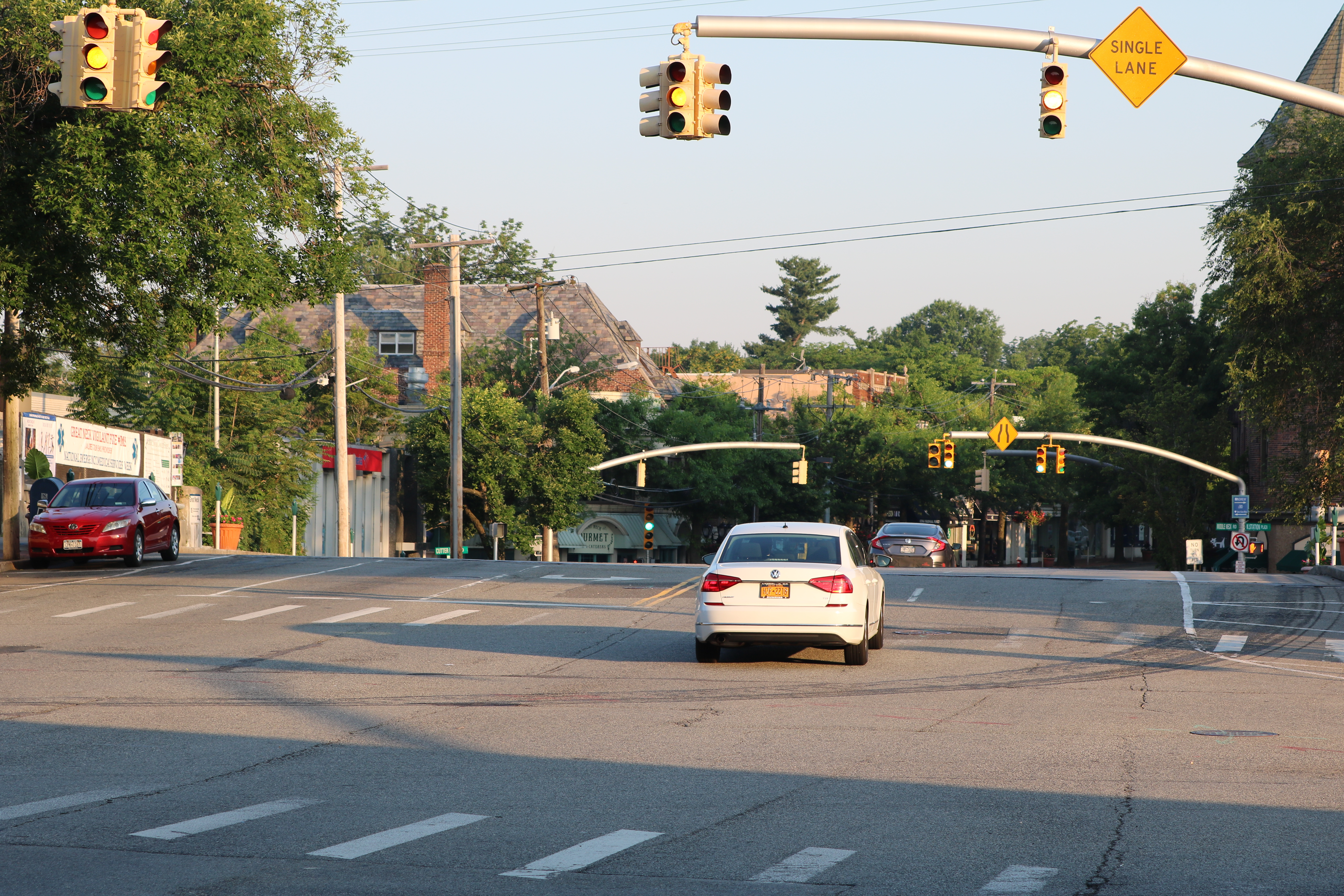
Middle Neck Road

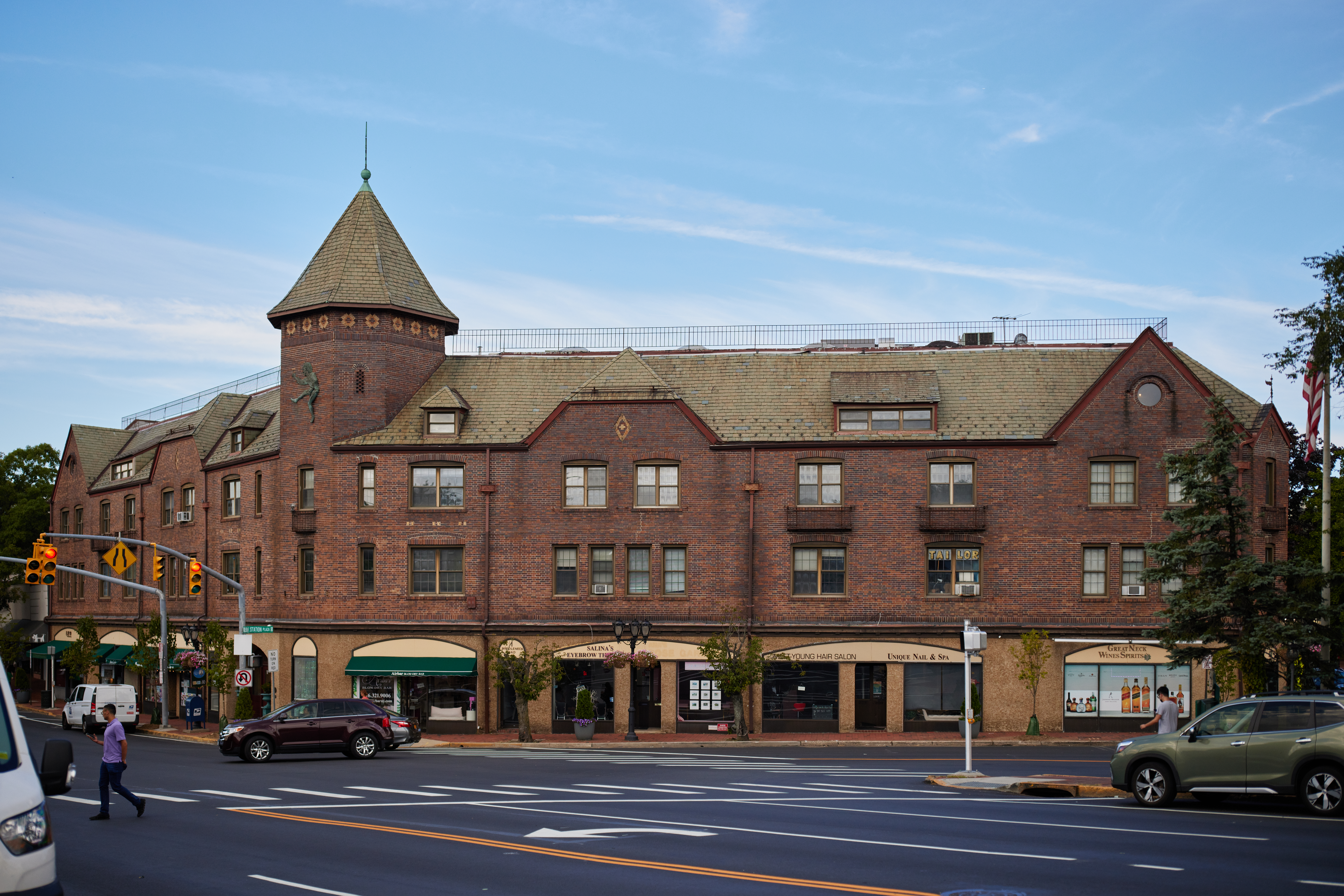
Grace and Thomaston Buildings

The Village of Great Neck Plaza was incorporated on May 3, 1930.

In 1866, the New York and Flushing Railroad extended their main line into Great Neck through a subsidiary called the North Shore Railroad, thus transforming it from a farming community into a commuter town. The NY&F was consolidated into the Flushing and North Side Railroad in 1869, only to be merged into the Flushing, North Shore, and Central Railroad in 1874, and leased in 1876 by the LIRR. Throughout much of the late 19th century, Great Neck was the terminus of what is today the Port Washington Branch of the Long Island Rail Road. The village was incorporated in 1930, even as the station that led to its existence was being reconstructed. In addition to the railroad station, Great Neck Plaza contains other historic structures, such as the local post office, and the Grace and Thomaston Buildings.

Great Neck Plaza encompasses a commercial district, two parks, and a residential section. The downtown region is made up of the Great Neck LIRR station, over 250 retail stores and service establishments, almost 90 multiple-family apartment buildings, 148 single family homes, approximately 40 office buildings, two four-star hotels, a nursing home, a senior independent living facility, and one assisted-care living facility.

== Geography ==
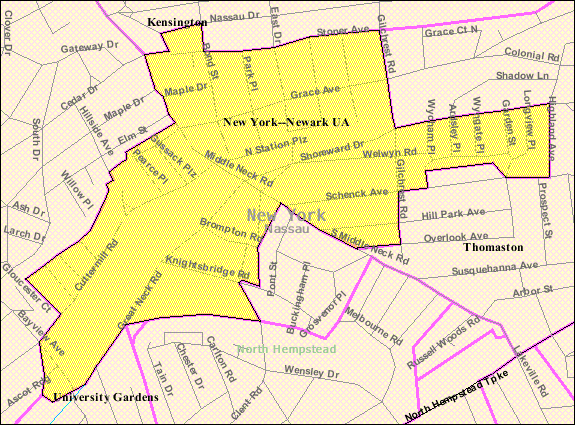
U.S. Census map of Great Neck Plaza.

According to the United States Census Bureau, the village has a total area of 0.3 square miles (0.78 km^{2}), all land.

== Demographics ==
Historical population
Census	Pop.	Note	%±
1940	2,031		—
1950	4,246		109.1%
1960	4,948		16.5%
1970	6,043		22.1%
1980	5,604		−7.3%
1990	5,897		5.2%
2000	6,433		9.1%
2010	6,707		4.3%
2020	7,482		11.6%
U.S. Decennial Census

=== Racial and ethnic composition ===
Great Neck Plaza village, New York – Racial and ethnic composition Note: the US Census treats Hispanic/Latino as an ethnic category. This table excludes Latinos from the racial categories and assigns them to a separate category. Hispanics/Latinos may be of any race.
Race / Ethnicity (NH = Non-Hispanic)	Pop 2000	Pop 2010	Pop 2020	% 2000	% 2010	% 2020
White alone (NH)	5,560	5,205	4,523	86.43%	77.61%	60.45%
Black or African American alone (NH)	98	88	135	1.52%	1.31%	1.80%
Native American or Alaska Native alone (NH)	1	1	5	0.02%	0.01%	0.07%
Asian alone (NH)	194	769	1,960	3.02%	11.47%	26.20%
Native Hawaiian or Pacific Islander alone (NH)	2	1	0	0.03%	0.01%	0.00%
Other race alone (NH)	12	24	38	0.19%	0.36%	0.51%
Mixed race or Multiracial (NH)	97	93	195	1.51%	1.39%	2.61%
Hispanic or Latino (any race)	469	526	626	7.29%	7.84%	8.37%
Total	6,433	6,707	7,482	100.00%	100.00%	100.00%

=== 2020 census ===
As of the 2020 census, there were 7,482 people in Great Neck Plaza. The median age was 48.1 years. 16.9% of residents were under the age of 18 and 29.2% were 65 years of age or older. For every 100 females, there were 78.7 males, and for every 100 females age 18 and over, there were 73.9 males age 18 and over.

100.0% of residents lived in urban areas, while 0.0% lived in rural areas.

There were 3,702 households, of which 22.9% had children under the age of 18 living in them. Of all households, 36.7% were married-couple households, 20.0% were households with a male householder, and no spouse or partner present, and 39.8% were households with a female householder, and no spouse or partner present. About 47.0% of all households were made up of individuals, and 24.3% had someone living alone who was 65 years of age or older.

There were 3,954 housing units, of which 6.4% were vacant. The homeowner vacancy rate was 2.0%, and the rental vacancy rate was 3.6%.

=== 2010 census ===
As of the census of 2010, there were 6,707 people, 3,603 households, and 1,581 families residing in the village. The population density was 20,853.4 inhabitants per square mile (8,051.5/km^{2}). There were 3,925 housing units at an average density of 12,723.4 units per square mile (4,912.5 units/km^{2}). The racial makeup of the village was 77.6% White, 1.5% African American, 0.05% Native American, 11.6% Asian, 0.03% Pacific Islander, 2.7% from other races, and 1.8% from two or more races. Hispanic or Latino of any race were 7.29% of the population.

There were 3,603 households, out of which 12.8% had children under the age of 18 living with them, 36.2% were married couples living together, 6.1% had a female householder with no husband present, and 56.1% were non-families. 51.1% of all households were made up of individuals, and 23.6% had someone living alone who was 65 years of age or older. The average household size was 1.74 and the average family size was 2.54.

In the village, the population was spread out, with 11.6% under the age of 18, 3.9% from 18 to 24, 32.3% from 25 to 44, 22.0% from 45 to 64, and 30.3% who were 65 years of age or older. The median age was 47 years. For every 100 females, there were 75.5 males. For every 100 females age 18 and over, there were 72.0 males.

The median income for a household in the village was $54,591, and the median income for a family was $70,781. Males had a median income of $51,863 versus $46,703 for females. The per capita income for the village was $42,914. About 4.1% of families and 7.1% of the population were below the poverty line, including 4.7% of those under age 18 and 12.8% of those age 65 or over.

== Government ==
=== Village government ===
As of September 2021, the Mayor of Great Neck Plaza is Ted Rosen, the Deputy Mayors are Pamela Marksheid and Gerald Schneiderman, and the Village Trustees are Michael DeLuccia and Lawrence Katz.

=== Representation in higher government ===
==== Town representation ====
Great Neck Plaza is located in the Town of North Hempstead's 5th district, which as of September 2021 is represented on the Town Board by Lee R. Seeman (D–Great Neck).

==== Nassau County representation ====
Great Neck Plaza is located in Nassau County's 10th Legislative district, which as of January 2023, is represented in the Nassau County Legislature by Mazi Melesa Pilip (R–Great Neck).

==== New York State representation ====
===== New York State Assembly =====
Great Neck Plaza is located in the New York State Assembly's 16th Assembly district, which as of September 2021 is represented by Gina Sillitti (D–Manorhaven).

===== New York State Senate =====
Great Neck Plaza is located in the New York State Senate's 7th State Senate district, which as of September 2021 is represented in the New York State Senate by Anna Kaplan (D–North Hills).

==== Federal representation ====
===== United States Congress =====
Great Neck Plaza is located in New York's 3rd congressional district, which as of February 2024 is represented in the United States Congress by Tom Suozzi (D–Glen Cove).

==== United States Senate ====
Like the rest of New York, Great Neck Plaza is represented in the United States Senate by Charles Schumer (D), and Kirsten Gillibrand (D).

=== Politics ===
In the 2016 U.S. presidential election, the majority of Great Neck Plaza voters voted for Hillary Clinton (D).

== Education ==
=== School district ===
Great Neck Plaza is located entirely within the boundaries of the Great Neck Union Free School District.

=== Library district ===
Great Neck Plaza is located within the boundaries of the Great Neck Library District (which is served by the Great Neck Public Library).

== Emergency services ==
Great Neck Plaza is protected by the Nassau County Police Department's Sixth Precinct (located in Manhasset), and fire protection is provided by two volunteer departments: Vigilant Hook & Ladder for locations north of the LIRR tracks and Manhasset–Lakeville Fire Department for locations south of the LIRR tracks.
