= Bob Griffin (basketball) =

American-Israeli basketball player

Personal information
- Born: June 24, 1950 (age 76)
- Listed height: 5 ft 10 in (1.78 m)

Career information
- High school: Paul D. Schreiber (Port Washington, New York)
- College: Columbia (1969–1970)
- Playing career: 1972–1979
- Position: Point guard / shooting guard

Career highlights
- FIBA European Champions Cup champion (1977)

Bob Griffin (Hebrew: בוב גריפין; born June 24, 1950) is an American-Israeli former basketball player. He played the point guard and shooting guard positions. He played basketball in the Israeli Basketball Premier League from 1972 to 1979. He is now an associate professor of English literature at Texas A&M University.

== Biography ==
Robert (Bob) Griffin grew up in Port Washington, on the North Shore of Long Island in New York State, and attended Paul D. Schreiber Senior High School ('68). He is 5 ft 10 in (178 cm) tall.

He then attended Columbia University, and played for the Columbia Lions basketball team in 1969–70. Griffin dropped out of Columbia after two years, in 1970. Griffin completed his B.A. at Tel Aviv University (English and Classics; '79). He retired from basketball to go to graduate school at Yale University (English Language and Literature; M.A. '80, M.Phil. '82, Ph.D. '85). He wrote his doctoral dissertation on Samuel Johnson, the 18th-century essayist, poet, lexicographer, and editor who undertook to compile the first modern English-language dictionary, and Griffin focused on the notion of reflection, a key concept for Johnson. Griffin taught English Literature at Bowdoin College in Maine (1983–87) and Tel Aviv University (for 18 years; 1987–2005), and is now an associate professor at Texas A&M University in College Station, Texas (since 2005).

Griffin married Ariela, an accountant for the Steimatzky bookstore of Yemeni-Jewish descent, whom he met at a bus stop in Israel. In 1977 they had a daughter in Israel, Becky Griffin, who became an Israeli model, TV presenter, and actress, and in 1983 they had a son, Oren Griffin, who works in the Israeli high-tech sector. When he retires, Griffin plans to return to his home in Tel Aviv.

== Basketball career ==
Visiting friends from the Columbia University basketball team who were playing in Israel, Griffin ended up playing basketball in the Israeli Basketball Premier League from 1972 to 1979, for Maccabi Ramat Gan and Maccabi Tel Aviv. A Jewish-American, he became an Israeli citizen under Israel's Law of Return. The highlight was playing for the Maccabi Tel Aviv team that won the 1976–77 FIBA European Champions Cup. In the semifinals, he recalled: "No one gave us a chance to win. The most that people (in Israel) were hoping for was that we didn't lose by too much. CSKA Moscow (the Russian Red Army team) had beaten Real Madrid, one of the elite teams in Europe, by 20 points the previous week in Madrid.... Our attitude was, maybe they beat Madrid last week, but they still have to beat us this week." Maccabi Tel Aviv beat the Russian Red Army 91 to 79. Griffin won three Israeli titles with the team.
