= Port Washington Play Troupe =

Port Washington Play Troupe is New York State's oldest continuously performing amateur theater organization. Based in the hamlet of Port Washington, the group was founded in 1927.

== History ==
According to a historical summary prepared in 2003 for the Port Washington Public Library Local History Center, the Play Troupe had its beginnings in 1927 and gave its first public performance of 3 one-act plays — Green Chartreuse, The Fog, and The Roadhouse in Arden on January 28, 1928 at St. Stephen's Episcopal Church Parish Hall. The group's first President was Percy Shawcross.

Starting in 1930, the group sponsored a series of plays for children with proceeds donated to a local charity, the Village Welfare Society, for the benefit of the unemployed. The children's shows were revived in 1990 and continued until 1994, when they were once again discontinued.

The Play Troupe was formally incorporated on November 8, 1952 and the following year began publishing its newsletter, Spotlight. The newsletter was published regularly until 1991 and sporadically after that time.

The company's first musical production, A Connecticut Yankee in King Arthur’s Court, was performed in 1956. Their children's show Jack and the Beanstalk produced the following year was featured on Voice of America and the U.S. Information Service as an example of community cooperation.

From 1972 to 1982, the troupe ran a summer theater program for local teenagers. Alumni from the program formed an associated troupe, the Harbor Theater Company, which mounted productions from 1984 to 1995; in the latter year, it took its production of The Emperor’s Tales on tour in Great Britain.

The Play Troupe was honored by the Port Washington Chamber of Commerce in 1979 with a plaque commemorating 50 years of service. It stopped mounting productions after 1995 but maintained its incorporation, and became active again in the 2010s.

The archives and records of the Port Washington Play Troupe covering the first 75 years of its existence are deposited in the Port Washington Public Library Local History Center. They were contributed by the troupe and by many individual members. The collection includes photographs, correspondence, clippings, programs, flyers and other materials pertaining to the organization and its productions and activities, including the Harbor Theater Company.

== Varsity Choral Society ==
Play Troupe has been continually active since 1927. Even in its quiet years the Play Troupe banner was carried by the Varsity Choral Society. The ensemble was founded in 1989 by musicians and singers led by Paul D. Schreiber high school alumnus Red Horowitz to honor Jerald B. Stone. For many years Jerry was the director of the Varsity Choir at Paul D. Schreiber High School in Port Washington, N.Y. Jerry was also the Varsity Choral Society's first director. The Varsity Choral Society, directed by Craig Tocher, sang every Christmas season at the Congregational Church of Manhasset, N.Y. The group was typically accompanied by string orchestra and organ. The Varsity Choral Society consisted of professional and talented amateur vocalists from Port Washington, Manhasset and the greater Town of North Hempstead, N.Y. The group closed its doors in 2021. Several of the Varsity Choral Society's recorded performances are available on the Internet Archive link below.

== Golden Era of Radio ==
In 2014 the troupe undertook a series of productions] to commemorate the period in American history when radio was the dominant mass medium and the principal source of popular entertainment.

In partnership with the community public radio station WCWP (88.1 FM) in Brookville, New York, operated by Long Island University, the troupe recreated six classic radio dramas with music, sound effects and period songs, which were performed before an audience in the university's Hillwood Recital Hall and either broadcast live or recorded for later broadcast.

Each of the six plays in the series is based on the screenplay for a popular film, adapted for radio. Such adaptations were common in the 1940s, and when first broadcast, often featured film stars reprising their roles. The six radio dramas in the series were adapted from The Maltese Falcon, The Thin Man, Casablanca, The Philadelphia Story, War of the Worlds, and It's a Wonderful Life. Several of the radio plays recorded performances are available on the Internet Archive link below.

In addition to the six radio plays, the troupe produced a full theatrical staging of the musical play The 1940's Radio Hour, about the behind-the-scenes antics at a small radio station before, during and after a live broadcast of a variety show. (The Harbor Theater Company mounted a production of the same play in 1991.)
