= Mark Wood (violinist) =

American rock violinist

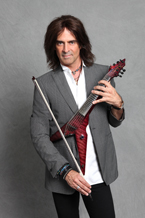

Background information
- Born: Mark Winthrop Wood; December 12, 1957 (age 68); Port Washington, New York, U.S.
- Genres: Symphonic rock; instrumental rock; hard rock; heavy metal
- Occupations: Musician; luthier; composer; teacher
- Instruments: Violin; viola
- Years active: 1990–present
- Formerly of: Trans-Siberian Orchestra
- Spouse: Laura Kaye
- Website: markwoodmusic.com

Mark Winthrop Wood is an American electric violinist and the founder of Wood Violins, a company that manufactures his electric violin designs. His music education program, Electrify Your Symphony, has been featured on news programs nationwide. He is also an Emmy-winning composer and the original string master of the Trans-Siberian Orchestra.

== Career ==
=== Education ===
Mark Wood studied under Dr. Richard Rusack at Paul D. Schreiber High School in Port Washington, New York, before beginning his career with a full scholarship at the Juilliard School in New York and studied viola under William Lincer until he left. He then learned under the teachings of Richard Wright.

=== Musician ===
Wood was the original string master of the symphonic rock group Trans-Siberian Orchestra. He has also played with Celine Dion, Billy Joel, Steve Vai, Westworld, and Lenny Kravitz. As a solo performer he has released seven CDs featuring his own versions of popular rock songs. On these CDs he is accompanied by "The Mark Wood Experience" consisting of one member of the Trans-Siberian Orchestra, his wife Laura Kaye, his child Elijah Wood (on drums), and several other musicians.

=== Composer ===
He is the founder of Mark Wood Music Productions, a company that creates music for use in film and television. Wood received an Emmy award for the music of CBS-TVs coverage of the 2002 Tour de France. He also composed a piece for electric string quartet commissioned by the Juilliard School, which he himself attended, entitled Nest of Vipers.

=== Luthier ===
After spending extensive time as a child in his father's woodworking shop, Wood built his first electric violin at age 10. In the 1970s, he gained notoriety from the stringed instrument community with his first solid-body electric violin and continued experimenting with numerous variations on this design in order to create an aesthetically appealing electric violin that would allow him to move freely while playing. It has since evolved into the Viper, a fretted, seven-stringed electric violin with a patented chest support system. The Viper's T.F. Barrett line (which includes four-, five-, and six string-violins) uses the Barbera Transducer pickup. Their tonal character is a nice blend between acoustic and electric.

He owns Wood Violins, the producer of five lines of custom-made electric violins and cellos. Judy Kang, violinist for Lady Gaga's The Monster Ball Tour, uses one of Wood's Vipers. She can be seen performing a solo on her Viper in HBO's Lady Gaga Presents the Monster Ball Tour: At Madison Square Garden. In addition to Kang, Carrie Underwood's violinist, Jimmy Herman, uses a Wood Violin. Big and Rich's violinist, Shawn Bailey, performed with a Viper at the Country Music Awards and on Good Morning America.

=== Teacher ===
Wood travels to over 75 schools annually with his music education program Electrify Your Symphony. The program brings together classical music with contemporary styles such as rock, jazz, and blues in order to provide a custom, hands-on learning experience. While Wood works primarily with orchestras, his wife Laura Kaye works with choirs in order to invigorate interest for the school's entire music program within both the community and student body. In January 2008, his method book Electrify your Strings was published.

He has also taught at the annual Mark O'Connor Fiddle Camps, and, in 2008, was elected to the board of the American String Teachers Association. He debuted the Mark Wood Rock Orchestra Camp (MWROC) in 2010, where he and many other high caliber world-class rock musicians hold a full week of workshops culminating in a final concert that includes all students and faculty. The camp is held each summer at MidAmerica Nazarene University in Olathe, KS.

On December 27, 2010, NBC's The Today Show aired a feature on the Electrify Your Strings! program filmed at an Oak Hills High School in Cincinnati, Ohio.

== Personal life ==
Wood has three brothers, 2 of whom play the violin and 1 who plays the cello. His mother was a pianist and his father an abstract painter. He is married to vocalist Laura Kaye, with whom he partners in his business ventures. They have one child, Elijah Wood.

== Discography ==
- Voodoo Violince
- Sanctuary
- Portrait of an Artist
- Shake Off the Gravity
- Guts, Grace and Glory
- Against the Grain
- These Are a Few of My Favorite Things
- Turbow
