= Voodoo Violince =

Studio album by Mark Wood
- Released: 1991
- Recorded: Millbrook Sound Studios in Millbrook, New York
- Genre: Instrumental rock, hard rock
- Length: 39:51
- Label: Guitar Recordings
- Producer: Mark Wood, Paul Orofino, John Stix

Mark Wood chronology
Voodoo Violince (1991)	Against the Grain (1995)

Voodoo Violince is the debut studio album by violinist Mark Wood, released in 1991 through Guitar Recordings.

== Critical reception ==
Professional ratings
Review scores
Source	Rating
AllMusic	3/5 stars

Roch Parisien at AllMusic gave Voodoo Violince three stars out of five, recommending it to open-minded fans of guitarists Joe Satriani and Steve Vai who might be looking for something different. He said that "Wood's arsenal of custom-made electric violins (including a six- and nine-string double-neck, and a Flying V) sounds much like a Star Trek phaser set to overload and on the verge of exploding." Parisien went on to further describe Wood's tone, saying "The high-pitched squeal can have an unearthly effect, full of feedback and vibrato but with the texture and range of a keyboard."

== Track listing ==
All tracks are written by Mark Wood, except where noted

No.	Title	Length
1.	"Monkeybats"	3:55
2.	"I Want to Take You Higher/Stand" (Sylvester "Sly Stone" Stewart)	3:50
3.	"Voodoo Violince"	5:08
4.	"Right-Engl-Boogie"	3:28
5.	"The Howling"	3:17
6.	"Kobiyashi Mahru"	2:07
7.	"Sledgehammer Hop"	4:44
8.	"Slip'n Anna Slid'n"	3:29
9.	"Roadwork"	5:09
10.	"Passion Principle"	4:44
Total length:		39:51

== Personnel ==
- Mark Wood – violin, keyboard, piano, strings, production
- Laura Kaye – vocals
- George Green – vocals
- Sylvestor Anthony Lewis III – vocals
- Dave Lewitt – drums, percussion
- Gerald Veasley – bass
- Gregor Kitzis – strings
- Denise Rude – strings
- Liz Lim – strings
- Eric Freelander – strings
- Rozz Morehead – background vocals
- Barbara Murray – background vocals
- Suze Albright – background vocals
- Lynette Washington – background vocals
- Shawn Green – engineering
- Paul Orofino – engineering, production
- Tom Schizzano – engineering
- John Stix – production
