= Main Street School =

Historic place in New York, United States

- U.S. National Register of Historic Places
- New York State Register of Historic Places
- Town of North Hempstead Designated Landmark
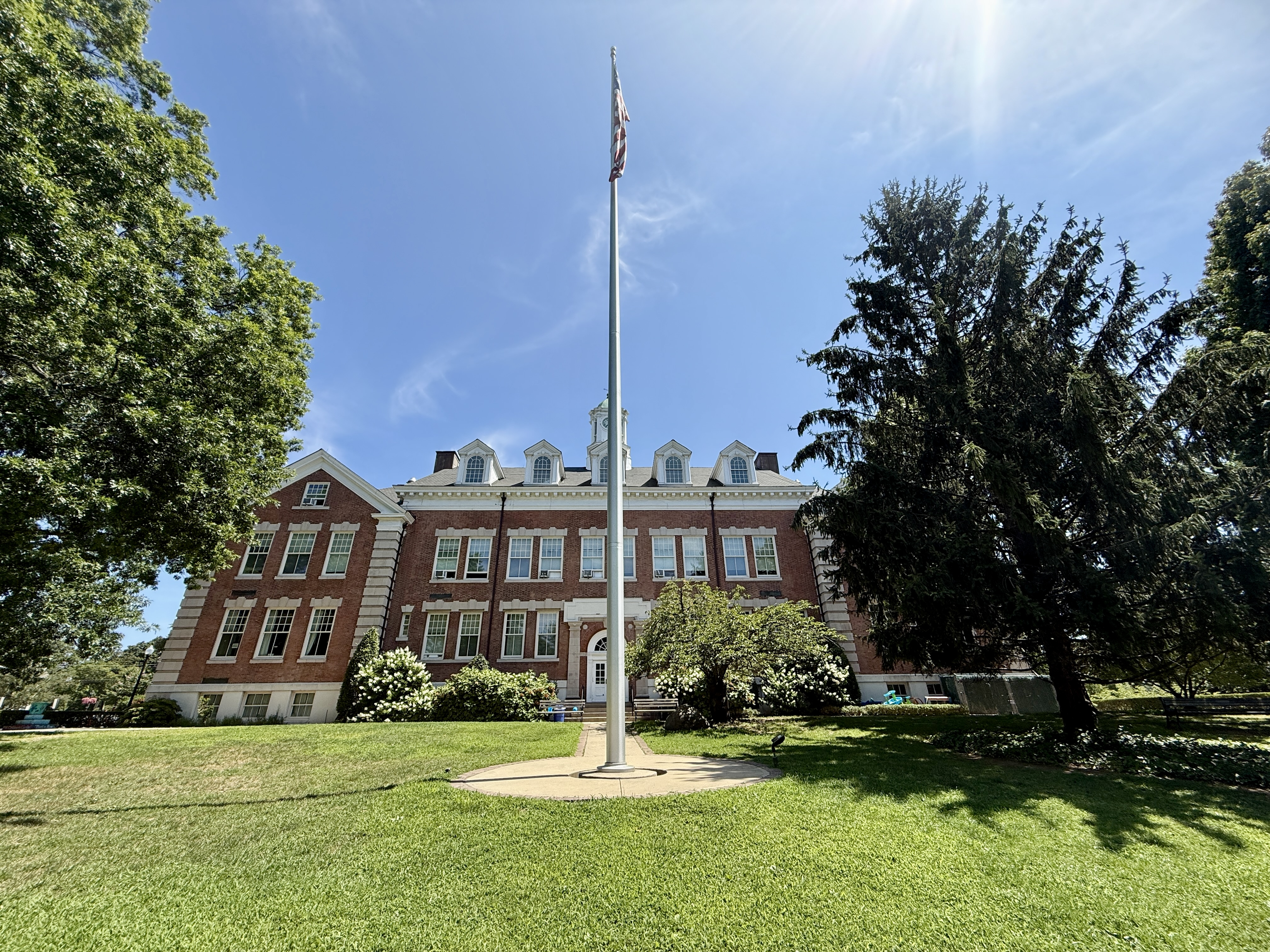
- The Main Street School in 2025

- Location within Long Island Location within New York Location within the United States
- Location: Main and South Washington Streets, Port Washington, New York
- Coordinates: 40°49′51″N 73°41′47″W
- Area: 5.5 acres (2.2 ha)
- Built: 1908
- Architect: Dusinberre, Ralph & Cornell, Frank
- Architectural style: Georgian Revival
- NRHP reference No.: 83001714

Significant dates
- Added to NRHP: February 10, 1983
- Designated NYSRHP: January 4, 1983
- Designated TNHDL: July 23, 1985

The Main Street School – also known as the Landmark on Main Street Community Center or simply the Landmark on Main Street – is a community center, retirement home, and historic school building located on Main Street in Port Washington, in Nassau County, New York, United States.

== Description ==
The school was completed in 1909 in the Georgian Revival style. It was built as a two-story, brick building with stone detailing and a cement-stucco faced raised basement level. A third story was added during a 1917 expansion.

It features a steep gable roof topped by an ornamental cupola with four clock faces. The roof has five gable dormers with round-headed windows.

== History ==
In the early 1900s, citing the need for a purpose-built high school to serve the growing Port Washington community, the Port Washington Union Free School District proposed the erection of a large, new school on Main Street; the district's existing schools were too small to efficiently function as a high school. After a bond measure to construct the Main Street School was subsequently approved by district residents in a vote of 55-to-46, construction on this new school began, with the cornerstone being laid on September 21, 1908. It was ultimately completed the following year, and it was expanded between 1916 and 1917.

In 1929, after the district opened a new high school – the present-day Carrie Palmer Weber Middle School – off Port Washington Boulevard (NY 101), the Main Street School was repurposed by the district to serve as an elementary school.

In 1985, the Port Washington Union Free School District closed the Main Street School. The property was subsequently acquired by the Town of North Hempstead, which transformed it and the historic school building into senior citizen housing and a large community center – roles which it continues to serve as of 2025.

=== Landmark designations ===
In 1983, the building was listed on the National Register of Historic Places and the New York State Register of Historic Places. Two years later, on July 23, 1985, it was listed as a Town of North Hempstead Designated Landmark.

== See also ==
- National Register of Historic Places listings in North Hempstead (town), New York
- List of Town of North Hempstead Designated Landmarks
- Paul D. Schreiber Senior High School
