= Port Washington, New York =

Hamlet and CDP in Nassau County, New York

- Hamlet and census-designated place
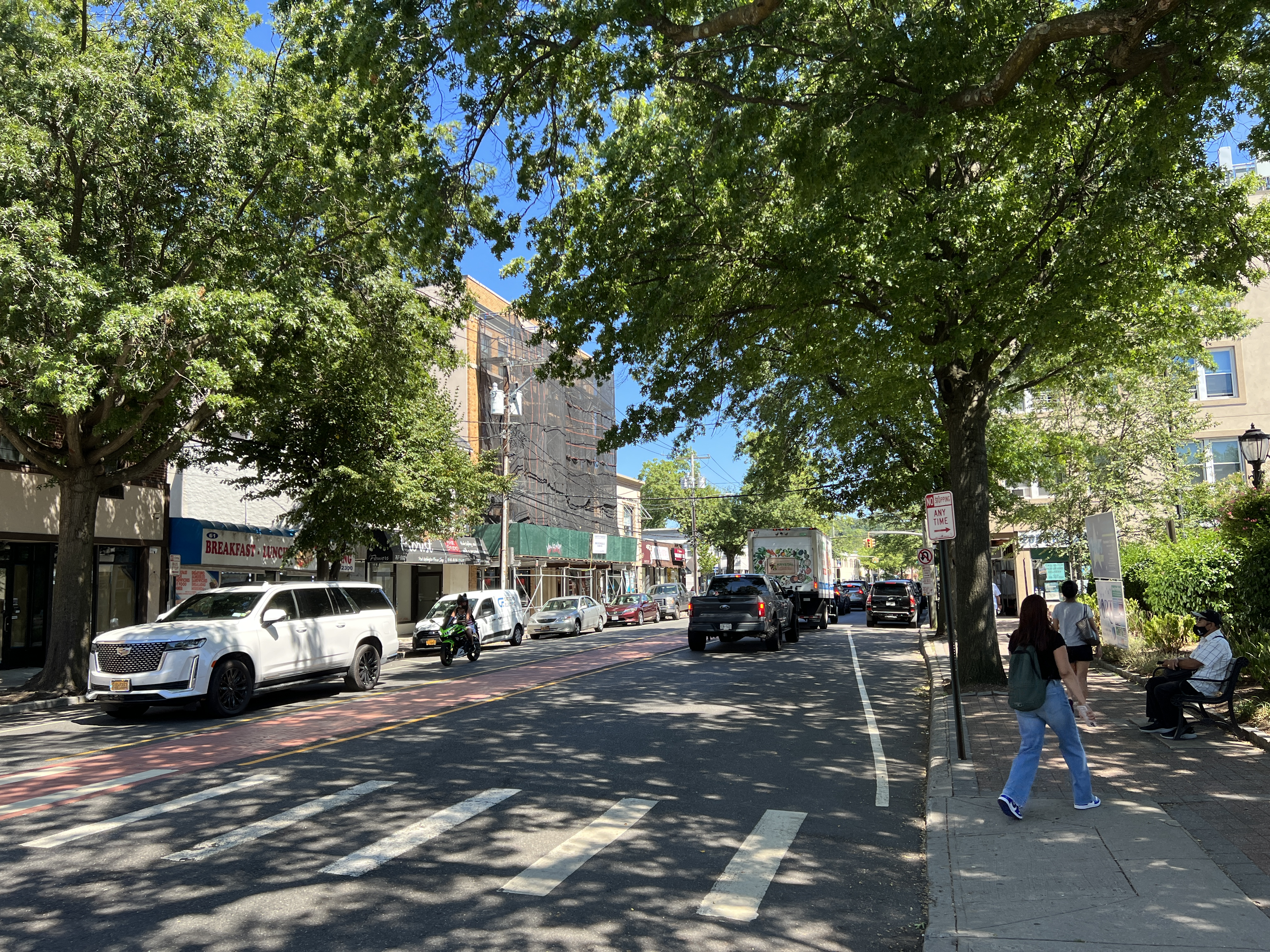
- Main Street in downtown Port Washington in September 2022
- Nicknames: "Downtown"; "Port"; "PW"
- Location in Nassau County and the state of New York

- Location on Long Island Location within the state of New York
- Coordinates: 40°49′44″N 73°41′12″W
- Country: United States
- State: New York
- County: Nassau
- Town: North Hempstead
- First settled: 1644
- Named for: George Washington

Area
  - Total: 5.65 sq mi (14.64 km^{2})
  - Land: 4.20 sq mi (10.88 km^{2})
  - Water: 1.45 sq mi (3.76 km^{2})
- Elevation: 98 ft (30 m)

Population (2020)
  - Total: 16,753
  - Density: 3,987.8/sq mi (1,539.71/km^{2})
- Demonym: Port Washingtonian
- Time zone: UTC−5 (Eastern (EST))
  - Summer (DST): UTC−4 (EDT)
- ZIP Codes: 11050–11055
- Area codes: 516, 363
- FIPS code: 36-59520
- GNIS feature ID: 0960979

Port Washington is a hamlet and census-designated place (CDP) on the Cow Neck Peninsula of Long Island, in Nassau County, New York, United States. The hamlet is the anchor community of the Greater Port Washington area. The population was 16,753 at the time of the 2020 census.

== History ==
What is now Port Washington was originally inhabited by the Matinecock Native Americans. European colonists – namely, Dutchmen and Englishmen – settled in the area in 1644, after they purchased land from the Matinecocks. Many of these settlers in modern-day Port Washington and across Cow Neck established farms or large colonial estates. Some of these early settlers belonged to prominent, early Long Island families – including members of the Hewlett, Sands, and Willets families, among others.

In the 1870s, Port Washington became an important sand-mining town; it had the largest sandbank east of the Mississippi River and easy barge access to Manhattan. Some 140 million cubic yards of local sand were used for concrete for skyscrapers in New York City (including the Empire State and Chrysler buildings), in addition to the New York City Subway. In 1998, the sand mines were redeveloped as Harbor Links – a golf course for North Hempstead residents.

In 1895, a group of Port Washington residents lobbied for the Long Island Rail Road to be extend what is now the Port Washington Branch from Great Neck to its present terminus in Port Washington; this request came after the failure of an 1882 attempt to extend the line from Great Neck to Roslyn. The LIRR agreed to build an extension to Port Washington, and the extended line – including the Manhasset and Port Washington stations – subsequently opened on June 23, 1898. The arrival of rail service in Port Washington spurred rapid development in the community.

The Port Washington Line of the New York and North Shore Traction Company's trolley system reached Port Washington in 1907 and opened in 1908; this trolley connected the community with Roslyn and Mineola. These trolleys operated until 1920, when the company collapsed.

In 1908, the Town of North Hempstead opened the Port Washington Town Dock, located along Manhasset Bay. This facility would become a major destination in Port Washington over the ensuing years and decades.

By 1910, the northern portions of the peninsula – including Sands Point, Mott's Point, and Barker's Point – sought to incorporate as villages and thereby split from the rest of Port Washington. Citing concerns over the effects which these developments would have on the rest of the Greater Port Washington area's taxpayers, a movement to incorporate Port Washington proper as the Incorporated Village of Port Washington was born, with a vote on the incorporation taking place in 1912. However, this proposal – like later proposals to incorporate the community – was unsuccessful, and the movement was highly contentious. In the 1912 referendum vote on the matter, the measure to incorporate Port Washington as a village was defeated by nine votes, and local Democratic Party leaders in the community had fiercely rallied against the incorporation plans.

In 1912, Main Street – the main east–west thoroughfare through downtown Port Washington – was renamed accordingly from Flower Hill Avenue, its former name.

In 1916, the Town of North Hempstead proposed erecting a vehicular bridge across Hempstead Harbor, between Bar Beach in Port Washington and Shore Road in Glenwood Landing, citing traffic demand. While this bridge would never be built, one further south – the William Cullen Bryant Viaduct – opened several years later as part of a separate but similar project, in January 1950. 1916 also saw the creation of Sunset Park and the erection of the Port Washington Water Pollution Control District's first treatment plant, which was located within the park.

As Port Washington continued to grow in the early 20th century, the need arose for improved law enforcement services in the community. This led to the establishment of the Port Washington Police District – as of 2025 the only remaining special district police department in New York state – in 1921.

In 1930, Port Washington tried to incorporate itself as a city, which would have had the same boundaries as the Port Washington Union Free School District – excluding Sands Point, which had already incorporated itself as a village several years prior. The plan to incorporate as a city ultimately failed when Baxter Estates, Flower Hill, and Manorhaven incorporated themselves as villages in order to retain home rule over their respective areas – events which effectively killed the city incorporation bill. The City of Greater Port Washington ultimately never formed, and the Port Washington CDP remains an unincorporated part of – and continues to be governed by – the Town of North Hempstead to this day.

1930 also saw the establishment of a ferry between Bowman's Point Road (now in the Village of Manorhaven) to New Rochelle in Westchester County via (and across) the Long Island Sound, after the courts ruled in favor of its establishment in a legal dispute over the proposal; the service was established a few months prior to the Manorhaven's incorporation, meaning service originally began in Port Washington proper. This ferry – operated by the Port Washington–New Rochelle Ferry Co., Inc. – would run until 1939, when the Bronx–Whitestone Bridge opened further to the west and rendered the service obsolete, partially due to a lack of sufficient business.

The Port Washington Post Office – commissioned by the United States Government as part of the New Deal – opened in 1935.

In the late 1930s, prior to the opening of the Marine Air Terminal at LaGuardia Airport, Port Washington and Manorhaven were home to Pan American World Airways' New York base for their Yankee Clipper Boeing B-314 flying boats; the waters of Manhasset Bay were ideal for flying boat operations. Common destinations served included London, Southampton (UK), the Azores, and Bermuda.

On the afternoon of January 30, 1949, a mid-air collision between a Pan Am Lockheed Constellation and a private Cessna 140 occurred over downtown Port Washington. Both occupants of the Cessna were killed, and all 33 occupants onboard the Pan Am flight survived; the Constellation performed an emergency landing at nearby Mitchel Field. Debris from the accident rained down on portions of the downtown – primarily in the vicinity of North Maryland Avenue, North Bayles Avenue, and Herbert Avenue – and in the Beacon Hill neighborhood.

In 1953, the community's current high school – Paul D. Schreiber High School – opened. It is named in honor of Paul D. Schreiber, who served as the Port Washington Union Free School District's superintendent from 1920 to 1953.

In June 1967, the John Philip Sousa Memorial Bandshell – one of the community's primary performing arts venues – was formally dedicated in Sunset Park. It is named after – and was built as a memorial to – American composer and longtime Port Washington resident John Philip Sousa, who lived in what would eventually become the Village of Sands Point.

Around 2007, the Town of North Hempstead took ownership of Hempstead Harbor Beach Park from Nassau County. It subsequently turned it and the adjacent, Town-owned park – Bar Beach Town Park – into a single, larger, 60-acre (24 ha) park facility, known as North Hempstead Beach Park.

=== Etymology ===
Port Washington is named for Founding Father and first President of the United States George Washington .

== Geography ==
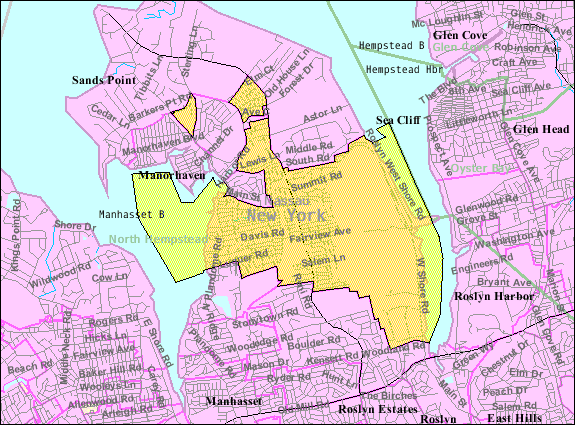
U.S. Census map of Port Washington

According to the United States Census Bureau, the CDP has a total area of 5.6 square miles (15 km^{2}), of which 4.2 square miles (11 km^{2}) is land and 1.4 square miles (3.6 km^{2}), or 25.22%, is water.

The hamlet is bordered on two sides with bodies of water: Manhasset Bay on its western side and Hempstead Harbor on its eastern side.

Two enclaves exist above the northern portions of the main, contiguous part of the hamlet.

Port Washington is located on the Cow Neck Peninsula.

=== Topography ===
Like the rest of Long Island's North Shore, Port Washington is situated on a terminal moraine, known as the Harbor Hill Moraine. This moraine was formed by glaciers during the Wisconsin Glacial Episode, and is named for Harbor Hill in Roslyn; Harbor Hill is the highest geographic point in Nassau County.

According to the United States Environmental Protection Agency and the United States Geological Survey, the highest point in Port Washington is Beacon Hill, at an elevation of roughly 270 feet (82 m), and the lowest point is Hempstead Harbor and Manhasset Bay, which are at sea level.

=== Climate ===
==== Overview ====
Port Washington has a humid subtropical climate (Cfa), bordering on a hot-summer humid continental climate (Dfa). Average monthly temperatures in the central CDP range from 33.0 °F in January to 75.9 °F in July.

Climate data for Port Washington, New York, 1991–2020 normals, extremes 1999–present
Month	Jan	Feb	Mar	Apr	May	Jun	Jul	Aug	Sep	Oct	Nov	Dec	Year
Record high °F (°C)	71 (22)	73 (23)	87 (31)	94 (34)	96 (36)	101 (38)	108 (42)	105 (41)	97 (36)	89 (32)	83 (28)	76 (24)	108 (42)
Mean daily maximum °F (°C)	39.8 (4.3)	41.9 (5.5)	48.7 (9.3)	59.7 (15.4)	69.4 (20.8)	78.6 (25.9)	84.0 (28.9)	82.6 (28.1)	76.4 (24.7)	65.2 (18.4)	54.5 (12.5)	45.0 (7.2)	62.2 (16.7)
Daily mean °F (°C)	33.0 (0.6)	34.5 (1.4)	41.0 (5.0)	51.2 (10.7)	60.8 (16.0)	70.2 (21.2)	75.9 (24.4)	74.8 (23.8)	68.3 (20.2)	57.3 (14.1)	47.1 (8.4)	38.6 (3.7)	54.4 (12.5)
Mean daily minimum °F (°C)	26.1 (−3.3)	27.1 (−2.7)	33.2 (0.7)	42.6 (5.9)	52.2 (11.2)	61.8 (16.6)	67.8 (19.9)	66.9 (19.4)	60.3 (15.7)	49.5 (9.7)	39.8 (4.3)	32.1 (0.1)	46.6 (8.1)
Record low °F (°C)	−4 (−20)	−5 (−21)	5 (−15)	13 (−11)	34 (1)	43 (6)	50 (10)	46 (8)	38 (3)	27 (−3)	18 (−8)	−2 (−19)	−5 (−21)
Average precipitation inches (mm)	3.86 (98)	3.06 (78)	4.30 (109)	4.02 (102)	3.75 (95)	4.31 (109)	4.06 (103)	4.33 (110)	4.22 (107)	4.20 (107)	3.42 (87)	4.31 (109)	47.84 (1,214)
Average snowfall inches (cm)	1.85 (4.7)	7.8 (20)	3.7 (9.4)	0.3 (0.76)	0 (0)	0 (0)	0 (0)	0 (0)	0 (0)	0 (0)	0.2 (0.51)	5.7 (14)	19.55 (49.37)
Average relative humidity (%)	73	75	72	72	75	74	73	71	73	73	71	75	73
Average dew point °F (°C)	22.0 (−5.6)	22.3 (−5.4)	27.3 (−2.6)	37.0 (2.8)	48.2 (9.0)	58.9 (14.9)	64.4 (18.0)	64.2 (17.9)	58.1 (14.5)	47.2 (8.4)	36.5 (2.5)	27.9 (−2.3)	42.8 (6.0)
Mean monthly sunshine hours	177	153	172	167	202	213	237	241	215	190	210	171	2,348
Mean daily daylight hours	9.6	10.7	12.0	13.3	14.5	15.1	14.8	13.7	12.4	11.1	9.9	9.3	12.2
Average ultraviolet index	2	2	2	4	5	6	6	6	5	3	2	2	4
Source 1: NOAA, PRISM, The Weather Channel (temperatures, average dew points, and average precipitation)
Source 2: Weather Atlas (all other data)

==== Plant zone ====
According to the United States Department of Agriculture (USDA), Port Washington is located within hardiness zone 7b.

=== Greater Port Washington area ===
The Greater Port Washington area is home to four incorporated villages in their entirety, in addition to the hamlet of Port Washington:

- Baxter Estates
- Manorhaven
- Port Washington North
- Sands Point

Additionally, the Greater Port Washington area also includes part of the Incorporated Village of Flower Hill (which is split between the Greater Manhasset, Greater Port Washington, and Greater Roslyn areas), as well as a small part of the Village of Plandome Manor (which is split between the Greater Manhasset and Port Washington areas).

== Economy ==
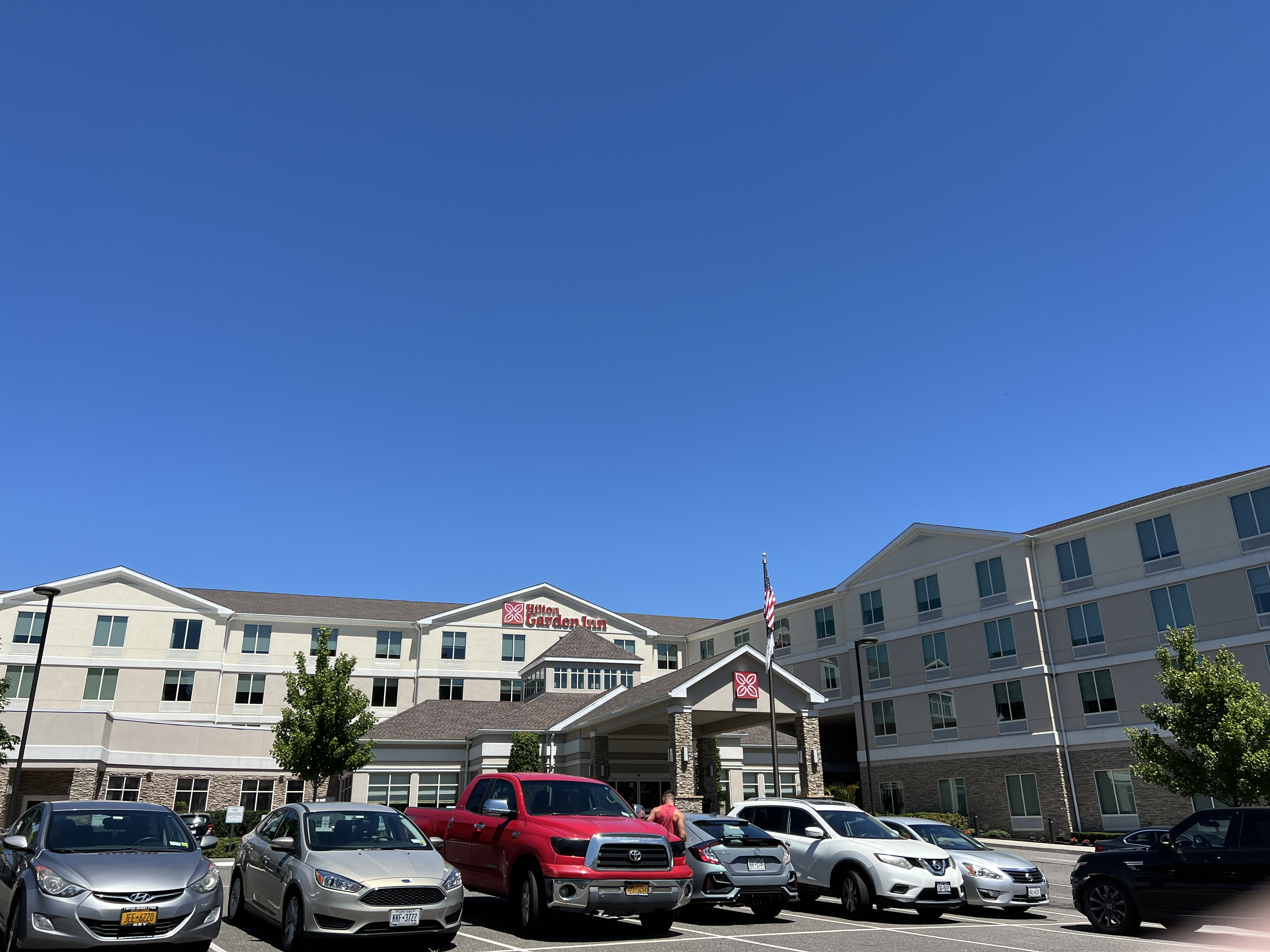
The Hilton Garden Inn in Port Washington in 2022

There are numerous small stores in Port Washington with 6 shopping centers, 4 strip malls and an industrial complex on the east side of Port Washington next to Hempstead Harbor, off West Shore Road. Entertainment One, NPD Group, Pall, and Systemax, as well as a Hilton Garden Inn are located in that industrial complex.

=== Business improvement district ===
The entire hamlet is located within the Greater Port Washington Business Improvement District's boundaries.

== Demographics ==
Historical population
Census	Pop.	Note	%±
2000	15,215		—
2010	15,846		4.1%
2020	16,753		5.7%
U.S. Decennial Census

=== 2020 census ===
As of the 2020 census, Port Washington had a population of 16,753. The median age was 44.7 years. 24.0% of residents were under the age of 18 and 22.0% of residents were 65 years of age or older. For every 100 females, there were 92.8 males, and for every 100 females age 18 and over, there were 88.1 males.

100.0% of residents lived in urban areas, while 0.0% lived in rural areas.

There were 5,925 households in Port Washington, of which 37.0% had children under the age of 18 living in them. Of all households, 62.5% were married-couple households, 10.5% were households with a male householder and no spouse or partner present, and 23.6% were households with a female householder and no spouse or partner present. About 21.3% of all households were made up of individuals, and 14.9% had someone living alone who was 65 years of age or older.

There were 6,269 housing units, of which 5.5% were vacant. The homeowner vacancy rate was 1.1% and the rental vacancy rate was 5.7%.

Racial composition as of the 2020 census
Race	Number	Percent
White	12,197	72.8%
Black or African American	334	2.0%
American Indian and Alaska Native	108	0.6%
Asian	1,505	9.0%
Native Hawaiian and Other Pacific Islander	5	0.0%
Some other race	1,086	6.5%
Two or more races	1,518	9.1%
Hispanic or Latino (of any race)	2,524	15.1%

=== 2010 census ===
As of the 2010 census, the population was 15,846. The racial makeup of the population was 82.2% White, 2.4% African American, 0.2% Native American, 8% Asian, 4.8% from other races, and 2.4% from two or more races. Hispanic or Latino people of any race were 13.4% of the population.

=== 2000 census ===
As of the census of 2000, there were 15,215 people, 5,521 households, and 4,168 families residing in the CDP. The population density was 3,613.7 inhabitants per square mile (1,395.3/km^{2}). There were 5,662 housing units at an average density of 1,344.8 per square mile (519.2/km^{2}). The racial makeup of the CDP was 85.97% White, 2.81% African American, 0.11% Native American, 6.07% Asian, 0.02% Pacific Islander, 3.15% from other races, and 1.86% from two or more races.

There were 5,521 households, out of which 36.3% had children under the age of 18 living with them, 62.9% were married couples living together, and 24.5% were non-families. Of all households, 20.4% were made up of individuals, and 10.4% had someone living alone who was 65 years of age or older. The average household size was 2.73 and the average family size was 3.15.

In the CDP, the population was spread out, with 25.3% under the age of 18, 5.0% from 18 to 24, 28.3% from 25 to 44, 26.4% from 45 to 64, and 15.0% who were 65 years of age or older. The median age was 40 years. For every 100 females, there were 90.9 males. For every 100 females age 18 and over, there were 87.5 males. The median income for a household in the CDP was $105,837 and the median income for a family was $122,646. Males had a median income of $91,024 versus $59,299 for females. The per capita income for the CDP was $53,815. About 3.1% of families and 4.7% of the population were below the poverty line, including 3.5% of those under age 18 and 5.0% of those age 65 or over.

=== Income and poverty ===
The median income for households in Port Washington, New York is $127,813, while the mean household income is $189,892.

== Government ==
=== Town representation ===
Port Washington, an unincorporated area within the Town of North Hempstead, is directly governed by said Town. It is located entirely within North Hempstead Town Council's 6th district, which as of January 2025 is represented by Mariann Dalimonte (D–Port Washington).

=== Representation in higher government ===
==== Nassau County representation ====
Port Washington is in the Nassau County Legislature's 11th legislative district, which as of January 2025 is represented by Delia DiRiggi-Whitton (D–Glen Cove).

==== New York State representation ====
===== New York State Senate =====
Port Washington is in New York's 7th State Senate district, which as of January 2025 is represented by Jack M. Martins (R–Old Westbury).

===== New York State Assembly =====
Port Washington is in New York's 16th State Assembly district, which as of January 2025 is represented by Daniel J. Norber (R–Great Neck).

==== Federal representation ====
===== United States Congress =====
Port Washington is in New York's 3rd congressional district, which as of January 2025 is represented in the United States Congress by Thomas R. Suozzi (D–Glen Cove).

==== United States Senate ====
Like the rest of New York, Port Washington is represented in the United States Senate by Charles E. Schumer (D) and Kirsten Gillibrand (D).

=== Politics ===
In the 2024 U.S. presidential election, the majority of Port Washington voters voted for Kamala D. Harris (D). Harris carried the hamlet by roughly 66% of the hamlet's vote, while Donald J. Trump (R) received approximately 33% of the remaining votes.

== Parks and recreation ==
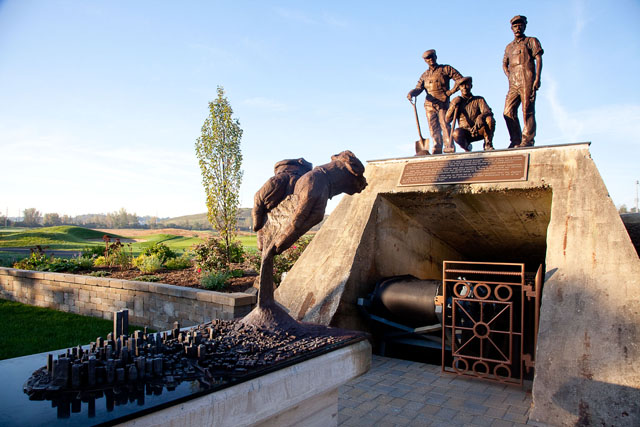
The Sandminers Monument, located off of West Shore Road, pays tribute to the area's historic sand-mining operations

There are several public parks in Port Washington. These include:

- Blumenfeld Family Park
- Harbor Links
- Merriman Park (Manhasset Bay Park District residents only)
- North Hempstead Aerodrome
- North Hempstead Beach Park
- Alvan Petrus Park
- Sand Miners Monument
- Sunset Park
- Town Dock Park

Other recreational facilities include Lions Field and the Port Washington Tennis Academy.

=== Park district ===
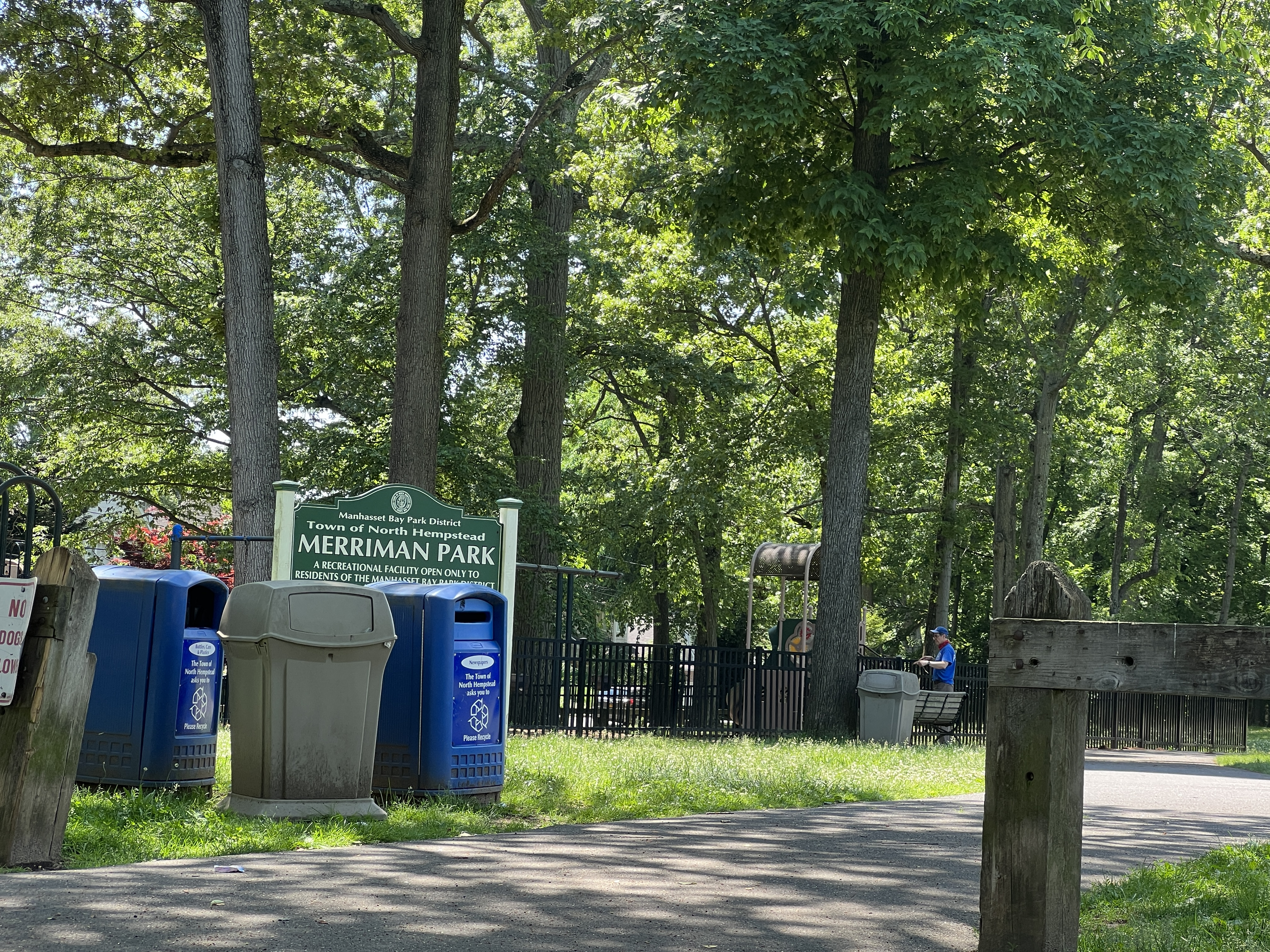
An entrance to Merriman Park in 2022

A small portion of Port Washington is in a park district named the Manhasset Bay Park District. This special district, which is operated by the Town of North Hempstead, covers the hamlet's Manhasset Bay Estates neighborhood, as well as a portion of the Plandome Country Club in the adjacent incorporated village, Plandome Manor.

The Manhasset Bay Park District is responsible for operating and maintaining Merriman Park, located on the former site of the Port Washington Union Free School District's Merriman School; the park is open exclusively to residents of the Manhasset Bay Park District.

=== Yacht clubs ===
- Manhasset Bay Yacht Club
- North Shore Yacht Club
- Port Washington Yacht Club

The former Knickerbocker Yacht Club was also in the hamlet, along Manhasset Bay.

== Education ==
=== School district ===
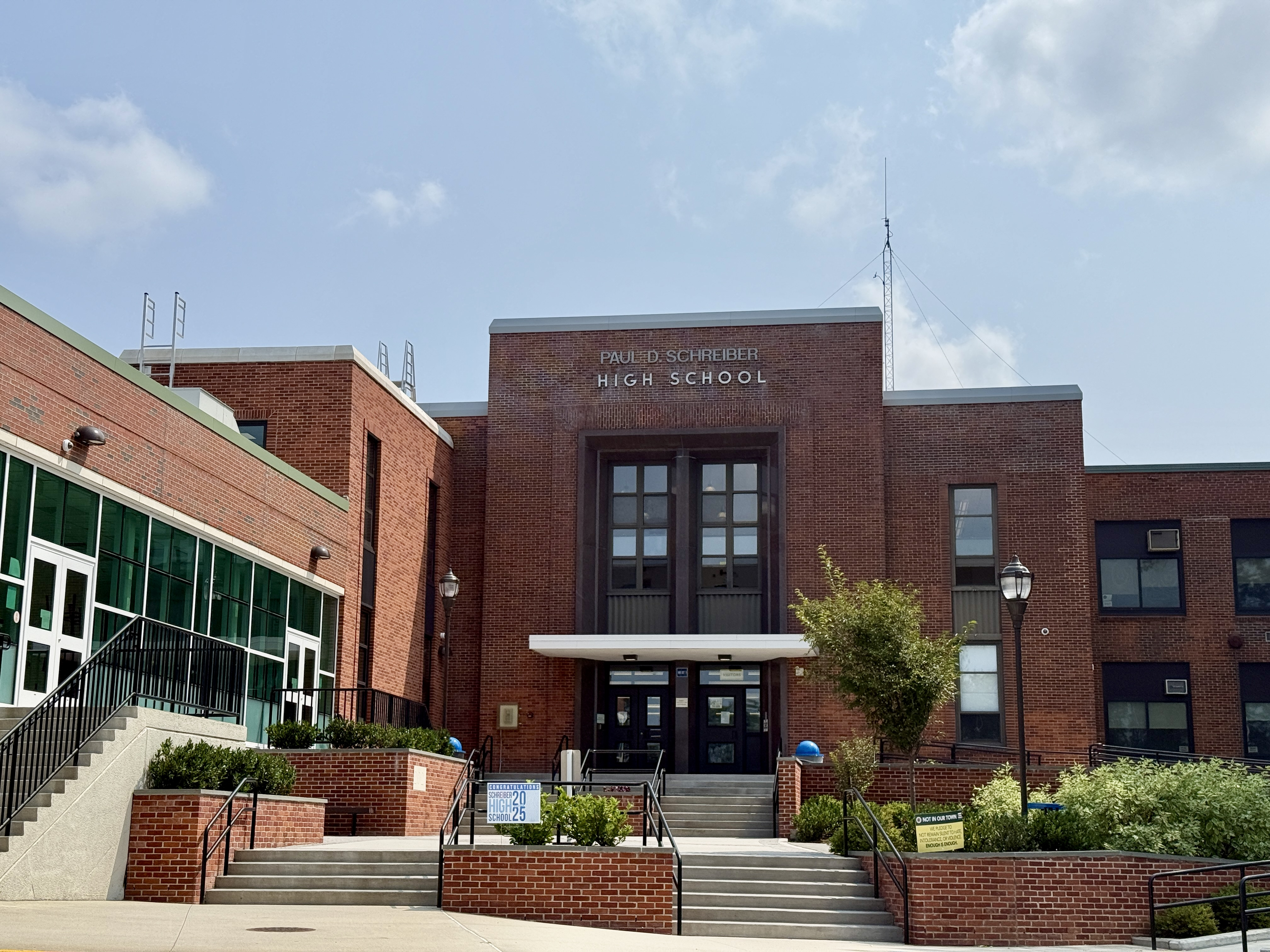
Paul D. Schreiber High School in 2025

Port Washington is within the boundaries of (and is thus served by) the Port Washington Union Free School District. Additionally, a small portion of the hamlet's southeastern corner is within the boundaries of the Roslyn Union Free School District. However, there are no homes in that area of the hamlet, and thus, all students in the hamlet who attend public schools go to Port Washington's schools.

In 2022, the Port Washington UFSD's high school, Paul D. Schreiber Senior High School, was ranked #733 nationally out of 17,843 schools and #77 in New York High Schools out of 1,212 schools.

=== Library district ===
Port Washington is located within the boundaries of the Port Washington Library District, which is served by the Port Washington Public Library, located in the Village of Baxter Estates.

== Infrastructure ==
=== Road ===
One state road passes through and directly serves Port Washington: Port Washington Boulevard (NY 101). Other major roads within the hamlet include Harbor Road, Mackey Avenue, Main Street, Murray Avenue, North Plandome Road, Radcliff Avenue, Sandy Hollow Road, South Bayles Avenue, West Shore Road/Beacon Hill Road, and Willowdale Avenue.

==== Parking District ====
Port Washington, in its entirety, is within the boundaries of (and is thus served by) the Town of North Hempstead's Port Washington Parking District – a special district. Several of the district's parking facilities are in the hamlet.

=== Rail ===
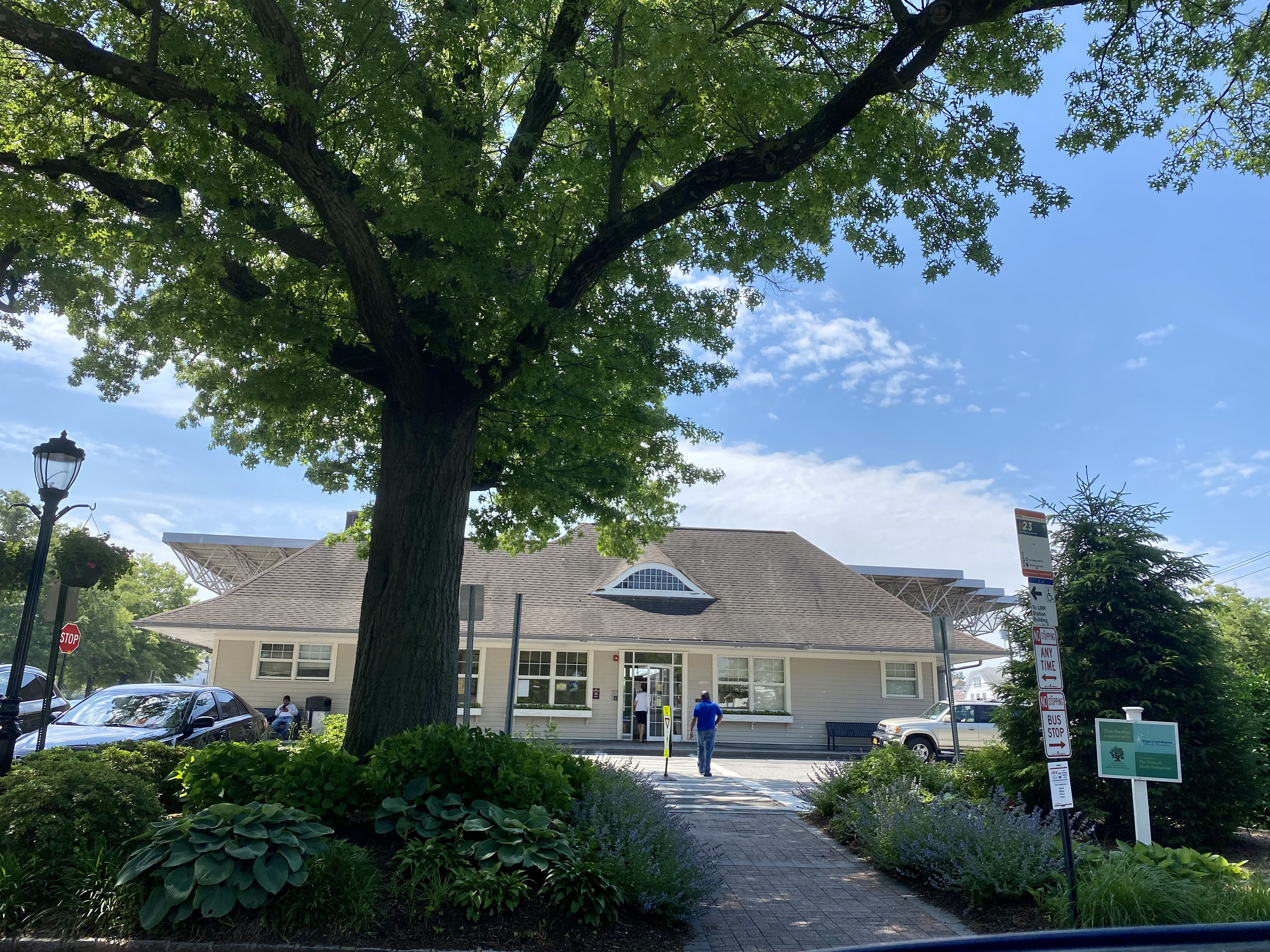
The Port Washington LIRR station's station house in 2021

Port Washington is the terminus of the Port Washington Branch of the Long Island Rail Road, which opened for passengers in 1898.

=== Bus ===
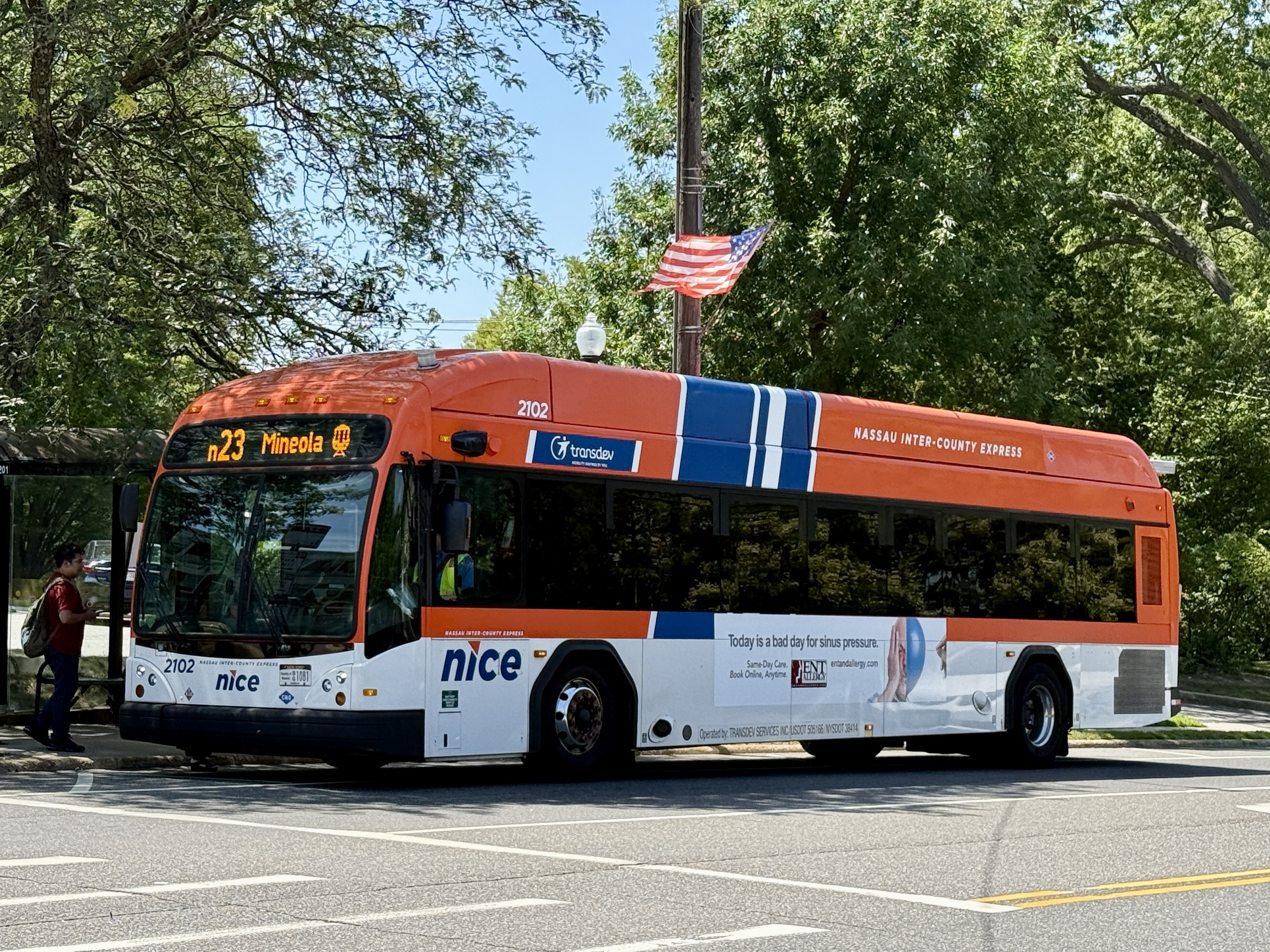
A Mineola-bound n23 bus on Main Street within the hamlet in 2025

The n23 bus, which is operated by Nassau Inter-County Express and runs from Manorhaven to the Mineola Intermodal Center in Mineola, serves Port Washington, running along Main Street and Port Washington Boulevard.

Additionally, NICE's Port Washington Shuttle provides local rush-hour service in the hamlet and throughout the Greater Port Washington area – as well as providing service to the Village of Roslyn, which is slightly southeast of Port Washington.

=== Utilities ===
==== Natural gas ====
National Grid USA provides natural gas to homes and businesses that are hooked up to natural gas lines in Port Washington.

==== Power ====
PSEG Long Island provides power to all homes and businesses within Port Washington, on behalf of the Long Island Power Authority.

==== Sewage ====
Port Washington is within the boundaries of (and is thus served by) the Port Washington Water Pollution Control District, which operates the sanitary sewer system serving the hamlet.

==== Water ====
The Port Washington Water District provides supplies the heavy majority of the hamlet with its water. The sole exception is the small portion of the hamlet located within the Roslyn Union Free School District's boundaries, which is instead served by the Roslyn Water District.

=== Healthcare and emergency services ===
==== Healthcare ====
There are no hospitals in Port Washington. The nearest hospital is St. Francis Hospital in the Village of Flower Hill.

==== Fire ====
The heavy majority of Port Washington is within the boundaries of (and is thus served by) the Port Washington Fire District, with the exception being the portion of the hamlet located within the Roslyn Union Free School District's boundaries, which is within the boundaries of (and is thus served by) the Roslyn Fire District.

==== Police ====
The Port Washington Police District provides police protection for the heavy majority of the hamlet, with the exception being the portion of the hamlet located within the Roslyn Union Free School District's boundaries, which is served by the Sixth Precinct of the Nassau County Police Department.

== Landmarks ==
The Thomas Dodge Homestead, Main Street School, and the Monfort Cemetery are listed on the National Register of Historic Places.

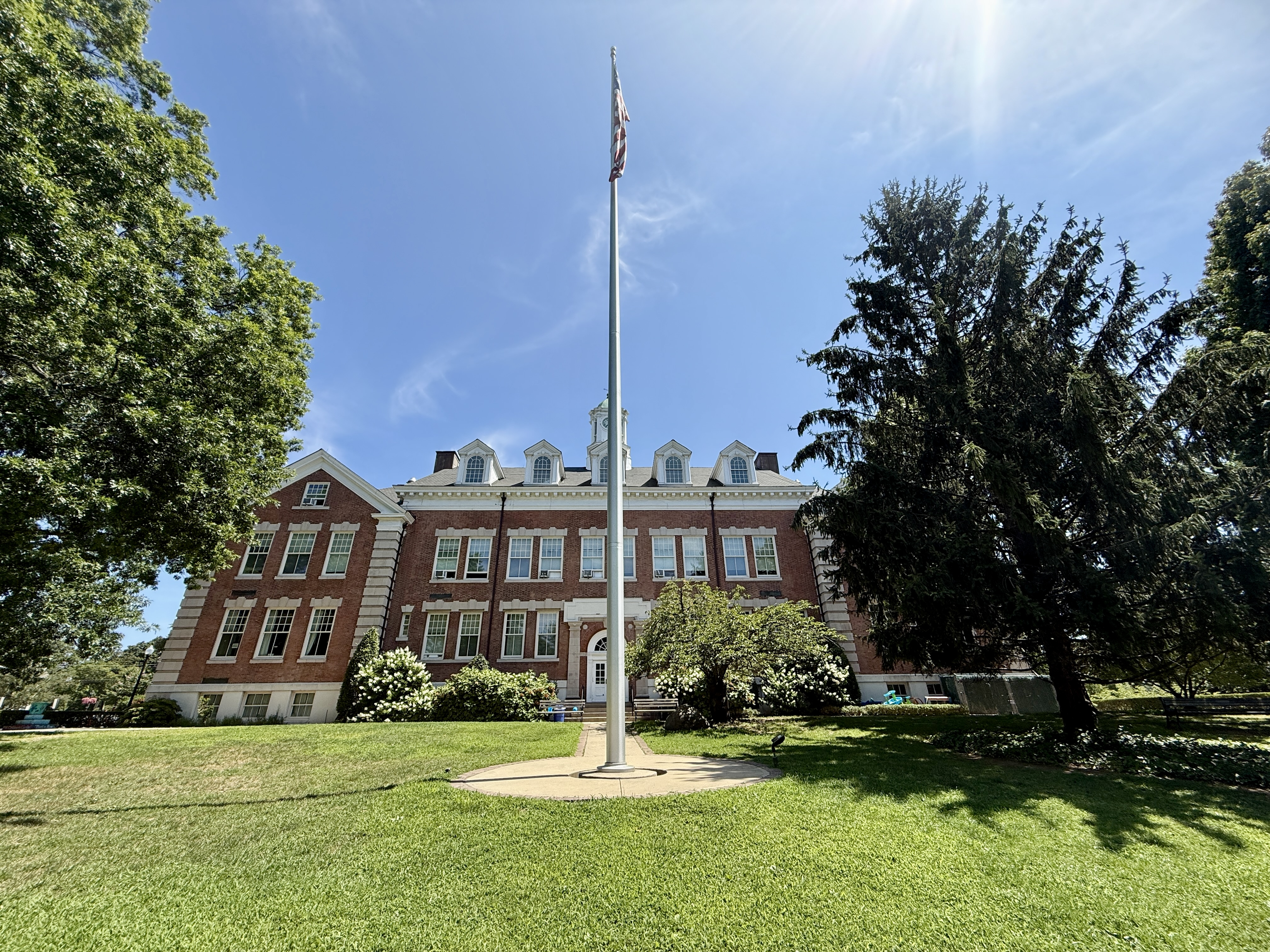
The Main Street School (now the Landmark on Main Street Community Center) in 2025

== Notable people ==
- Sebastian Arcelus (born 1976) – Actor
- Eric Bloom (born 1944) – Musician
- Bob Carroll (1918–1994) – Singer and actor; lived on Glen Lane
- John Cassavetes (1929–1989) – Actor and filmmaker
- Evelyn Danzig (1902–1996) – Concert pianist and composer
- William Dumpson (1930–2014) – played in the Negro leagues and for the Harlem Globetrotters
- John Fasano (1961–2014) – Screenwriter and director
- William H. Folwell (1924–2022) – American Episcopal prelate
- Peter Fornatale – Disc jockey, radio personality, and author
- Fontaine Fox (1884–1964) – American cartoonist and illustrator
- Lucy Fradkin (born 1953) – Visual artist
- Howard Gould (1871–1959) – Financier
- Bob Griffin (born 1950) – American-Israeli basketball player and English literature professor.
- Hartford N. Gunn, Jr. – Founding President of PBS; son of North Hempstead Town Supervisor Hartford N. Gunn, Sr.
- Lazlo Halasz (1905–2001) – Conductor; lived at 3 Leeds Drive
- William Randolph Hearst (1863–1951) – Publisher
- William S. Hults Jr. (1906–1999) – Politician and New York State Department of Motor Vehicles commissioner; lived on Lowell Road
- Craig M. Johnson (born 1971) – Former New York State senator
- Martin W. Littleton (1873–1934) – Congressman for the area in the United States House of Representatives between 1911 and 1913.
- Katie Lowes (born 1982) – Actress
- Jimmy McPartland (1907–1991) – Jazz cornetist and husband to Mariann McPartland; lived on Essex Court
- Margaret Marian McPartland (1918–2013) – English-born jazz pianist; lived on Essex Court
- Stacy Mehrfar – Iranian-American visual artist
- LuEsther Mertz (1905–1991) – Businesswoman and philanthropist
- Evelyn Mulry Moore (1942–2012) – Wheelchair athlete
- Kelly Moran – Musician; grew up in Port Washington
- Don Orehek (1928–2022) – Freelance cartoonist; lived on Revere Road
- Nancy Overton (1926–2009) – Singer
- Susan Quittmeyer (born 1953) – Opera singer
- Anthony Scaramucci (born 1964) – Founder of SkyBridge Capital; former White House Communications Director to President Donald Trump
- Richard Shindell (born 1960) – Singer-songwriter; grew up in Port Washington
- Richard Sonnenfeldt (1923–2009) – Engineer, executive, author, and the United States' chief interpreter for prosecutors during the Nuremberg Trials
- Sean Spicer (born 1971) – 30th White House Press Secretary
- Jean Swain (1923–2000) – Singer
- Jon "Stugotz" Weiner (born 1972) – Co-host of The Dan Le Batard Show with Stugotz
- Jeanine Tesori (born 1961) – Composer and musical arranger; grew up in Port Washington
- George Vecsey (born 1939) – Sports columnist for The New York Times
- Jordan Walker (born 1999) – professional basketball player
- Mark Wood – Rock violinist
- Burt Young (1940–2023) – Actor best known for appearing in Rocky and its sequels

== In popular culture ==
Over the years, scenes for various shows and movies have been filmed within the hamlet. These include scenes for Miracle on 34th Street (1947), Meet the Parents (2000), and Louder than Bombs (2015).

== See also ==
- Port Washington Play Troupe
- Port Washington Parking District
- Port Washington Water Pollution Control District
