= Paul D. Schreiber Senior High School =

High school in Nassau County, New York, United States

Paul D. Schreiber High School

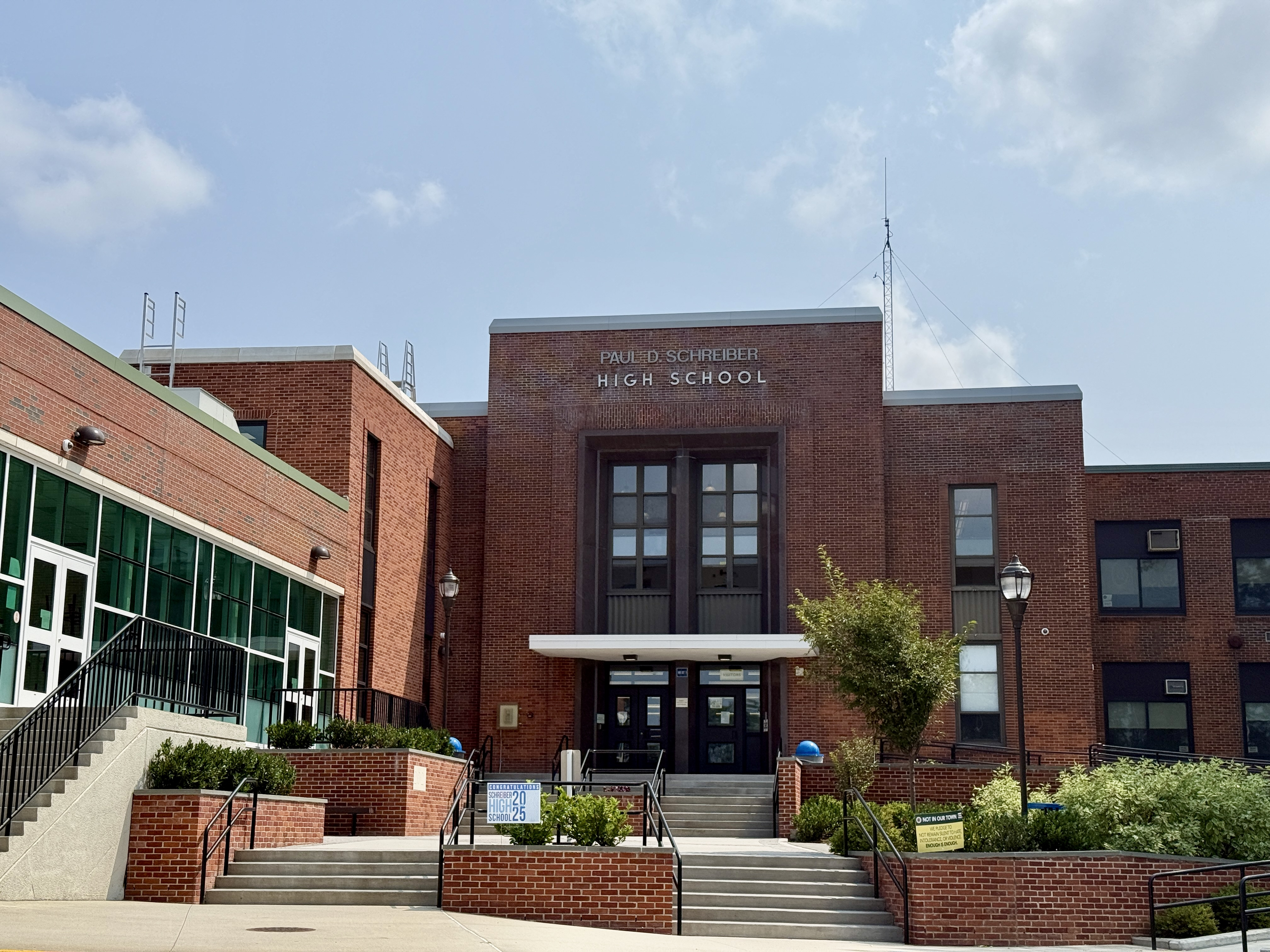
- Paul D. Schreiber High School in 2025

Location
- 101 Campus Dr; Port Washington, New York 11050; United States; 40°49′47″N 73°40′51″W

Information
- Type: Public
- Established: 1953
- School district: Port Washington Union Free School District
- NCES School ID: 362358003295
- Principal: Kathryn Behr
- Teaching staff: 129.47 (on an FTE basis)
- Grades: 9-12
- Enrollment: 1,614 (2023-2024)
- Student to teacher ratio: 12.47
- Campus: Suburban: Large
- Colors: Royal Blue and White
- Mascot: Vikings
- Newspaper: The Schreiber Times
- Yearbook: Port Light
- Website: sch.portnet.org

Paul D. Schreiber Senior High School (commonly Paul D. Schreiber High School or Schreiber High School) is a four-year public high school in Port Washington, in Nassau County, New York, United States. It is operated by the Port Washington Union Free School District.

As of the 2023–24 school year, the school had an enrollment of 1,614 students and 129.47 classroom teachers (on an FTE basis), for a student–teacher ratio of 12.47:1. There were 305 students (18.9% of enrollment) eligible for free lunch and 21 (1.3% of students) eligible for reduced-cost lunch.

The school is one of the top public high schools on Long Island. U.S. News & World Report awarded Schreiber a gold medal in its 2014 rankings. In 2015, it was ranked as the 283rd best high school in the United States by U.S. News & World Report, with a student/teacher as well ratio of 13:1.

The school offers numerous extracurricular activities in academics, athletics, the arts, music, and the sciences.

== History ==
Schreiber High School was originally constructed in 1953, when the existing Port Washington Union Free School District's existing facilities were determined to no longer be sufficient to continue serving as the district's high school; the existing facilities – including the district's present-day Carrie Palmer Weber Middle School, located adjacent to it – would subsequently be repurposed by the district to solely serve students in lower grades.

The school was designed by the New York City-based architectural firm of Eggers & Higgins.

=== Name ===
Schreiber High School is named in honor of Paul D. Schreiber, who served as the Superintendent of the Port Washington Union Free School District from 1920 to 1953.

== Academics ==
The school offers 26 Advanced Placement classes, more than three times the state average. The Advanced Placement exam pass rate is 83%, meaning that 83% of students attain a score of 3 or higher on the AP exam, compared to the state average of 61%, and more than half of the student body, 53%, takes at least one Advanced Placement exam, compared to the state average of 16%. In 2022, 75% of students took at least one Advanced Placement exam.

== Athletics ==
Schreiber High School is located in Section VIII of the New York State Public High School Athletic Association (NYSPHAA). As such, it competes against other public schools in Nassau County, New York in baseball, basketball, bowling, badminton, cheerleading, cross country, field hockey, football, golf, lacrosse, soccer, softball, swimming, track and field, tennis, volleyball, and wrestling.

The mascot is a blue and white Viking head with yellow hair. It is often compared to the Viking head used by the Minnesota Vikings of the National Football League.

In November 2008, the Girls' Tennis team beat previously defeated Westhampton Beach High School in the Long Island Championship. This marked the second straight year that the team won the title, becoming the first team to repeat as champions.

== Research program ==
Schreiber has a nationally recognized research program in Mathematics, Science, and Social Science. There have been numerous local and national winners from the school's research program. Students compete in a variety of competitions including the Siemens Competition, Long Island Science and Engineering Fair, and Intel International Science and Engineering Fair.

The school's research program has attained nationwide recognition through student success in the Intel Science Talent Search competition. From 2002 to 2010, the school had the sixth most semifinalists in the nation with 50, trailing only Montgomery Blair High School (108), Stuyvesant High School (103), Ward Melville High School (85), Thomas Jefferson High School for Science and Technology (75), and Bronx High School of Science (59).

In 2000, nine semifinalists were selected, leading all schools on Long Island. Schreiber ranked fifth nationally and second among comprehensive high schools. Furthermore, three students were chosen as finalists, leading all schools in the country. Ultimately, a student from Schreiber won first place in the competition for her steganography project. She encrypted a message in the gene sequence of a DNA strand.

In January 2008, the school produced six Intel Science Talent Search semifinalists, the second highest total on Long Island. Additionally, two finalists were selected from the school. Schreiber was only one of two schools that produced double finalist winners. Along with Great Neck North High School, Schreiber produced the second most finalists in the country, trailing only Stuyvesant High School of Manhattan. A student from Schreiber was selected to be one of the top ten winners of the Intel Science Talent Search 2008, winning a scholarship of $20,000. The student was the ninth-place winner for a zoology project based on Odonate populations.

== School publications ==
Schreiber's main student publication is The Schreiber Times. The newspaper was first established in 1924 at the original Port Washington High School as The Port Weekly. The newspaper now publishes 24 page monthly issues that include sections about News, Features, Opinions, Arts and Entertainment, and Sports.

The Schreiber Times has won awards for each of its five sections from well-acclaimed sources, including the Long Island newspaper Newsday, the American Scholastic Press Association, the Columbia Scholastic Press Association, and the Empire State School Press Association. In 2012, The Schreiber Times launched an online version of the print paper. There is as an archive of all issues of The Schreiber Times and The Port Weekly published since 1924.

== Notable alumni ==
- Kenny Albert (class of 1986) – television sportscaster
- John Cassavetes (class of 1947) - Academy Award-nominated director, writer and actor best known for the films Rosemary's Baby and A Woman Under the Influence
- John Fasano (class of 1979) – Hollywood screenwriter, film producer and director
- Ellen V. Futter (class of 1967) - President, American Museum of Natural History
- Bob Griffin (class of 1968) - American-Israeli basketball player, and English Literature professor
- Craig M. Johnson (class of 1989) – former New York State Senator
- Frederick M. Lawrence (class of 1973) – 8th President of Brandeis University
- Jordan Laws (class of 1998) – Grammy Award-winning producer for Christina Aguilera "Back To Basics" album in 2006
- David Lobell (class of 1996) – Associate Professor in Environmental Earth System Science at Stanford University and 2013 recipient of the MacArthur Genius Grant
- Katie Lowes (class of 2000), actress and theater director, best known for her roles in the ABC political drama series Scandal and the Netflix drama series Inventing Anna
- Paul Zane Pilzer (class of 1971) – economist
- Anthony Scaramucci (class of 1982) – host of "Wall Street Week" on Fox Business, founder of the SALT Conference, founder of SkyBridge Capital, and, briefly, former Communications Director for President Donald Trump
- Stugotz (class of 1991) – sports talk radio host
- Jeanine Tesori – Drama Desk Award for Outstanding Music winning composer
- Craig Thomas (class of 1993) – co-creator of How I Met Your Mother
- Bob Verdi – journalist, Chicago Blackhawks team historian
- Mark Wood (class of 1975) – violinist, musical instrument designer

== See also ==
- Port Washington Union Free School District
- Port Washington, New York
- Main Street School
- Sands Point, New York
- Manorhaven, New York
