= Port Washington Union Free School District =

School district in the U.S. state of New York

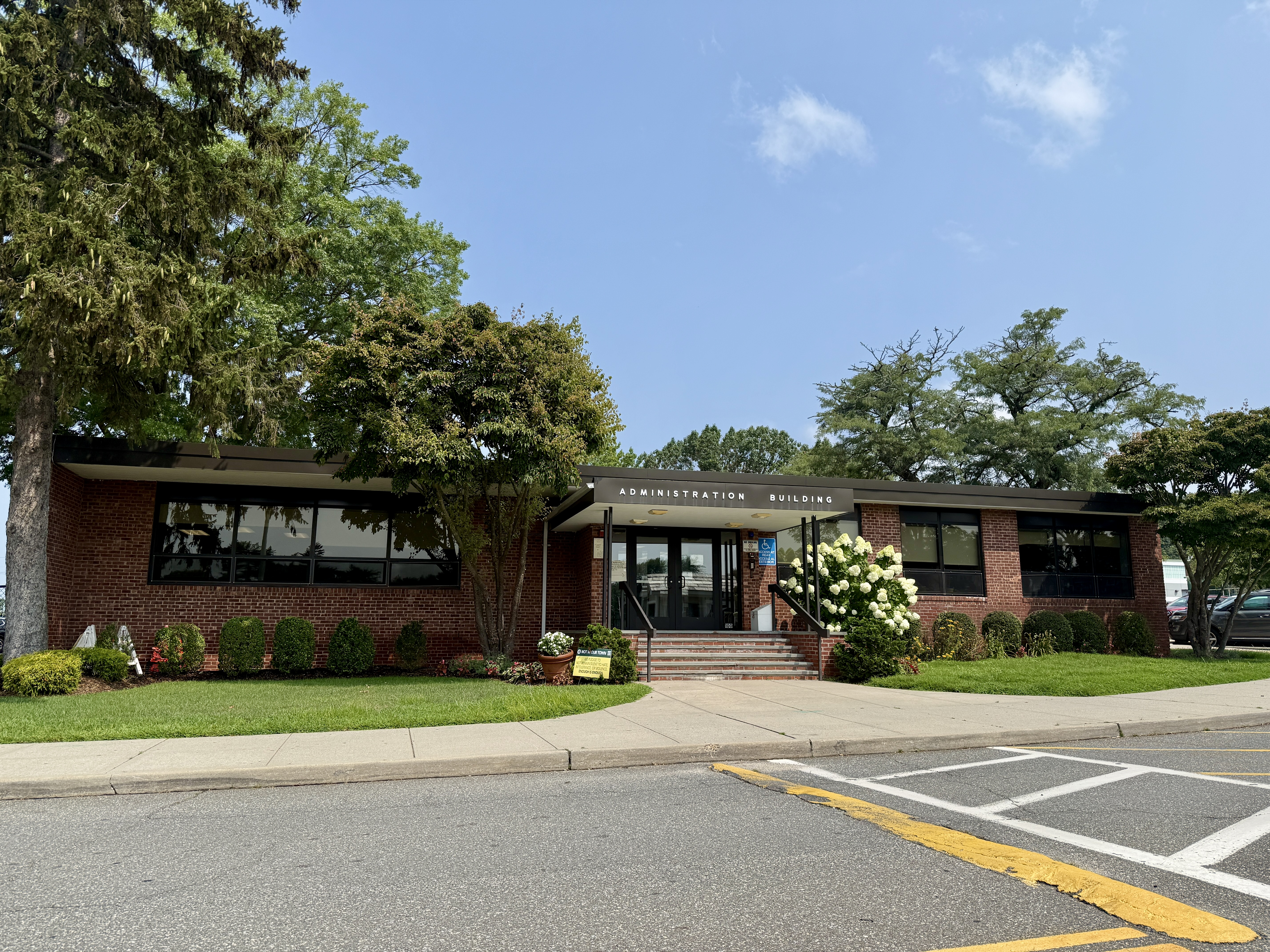
- The district's administrative offices in 2025
- 100 Campus Drive, Port Washington, NY 11050

District information
- Type: Public
- Established: 1757
- Superintendent: Christopher Shields, Ed.D.
- Schools: 7 (5 elementary; 2 secondary)

Students and staff
- Students: 5,356 (as of 2018-2019)
- District mascot: Vikings

Other information
- Website: https://www.portnet.org/

The Port Washington Union Free School District – also known as the Port Washington School District or simply Port Schools – is a public school district on the Cow Neck Peninsula within the Town of North Hempstead, in Nassau County, on Long Island, in New York, United States.

== Overview ==
=== Service area ===
The Port Washington UFSD serves the villages of Baxter Estates, Manorhaven, Port Washington North, and Sands Point, and the unincorporated hamlet of Port Washington, as well as portions of the villages of Flower Hill and Plandome Manor.

=== Superintendent ===
The district's superintendent of schools is Dr. Gaurav Passi,. Shields was promoted to interim superintendent due to an incident involving former superintendent Dr. Michael Hynes, who had been arrested and charged with a DWI after hitting and seriously injuring a motorcyclist on November 24, 2024; Shields was promoted shortly after Hynes tendered his notice of resignation.

=== Mascot ===
The district's mascot is the viking.

== History ==
The Port Washington Union Free School District was founded in 1757, with the opening of a one-room schoolhouse. By 2025, the district had grown to include a total of seven schools.

The district's current high school, Paul D. Schreiber Senior High School, opened in 1953.

In September 1962, the Eggers & Higgins-designed Florence and Daniel Guggenheim Elementary School – located at the southern edge of the Village of Sands Point, adjacent to the Port Washington Terrace neighborhood of unincorporated Port Washington – opened. The school is located on a 17.2-acre (7.0 ha) parcel of land donated to the school district by the Daniel and Florence Guggenheim Foundation.

== Schools ==
The Port Washington UFSD operates the following schools:

=== Elementary ===
- Guggenheim Elementary School
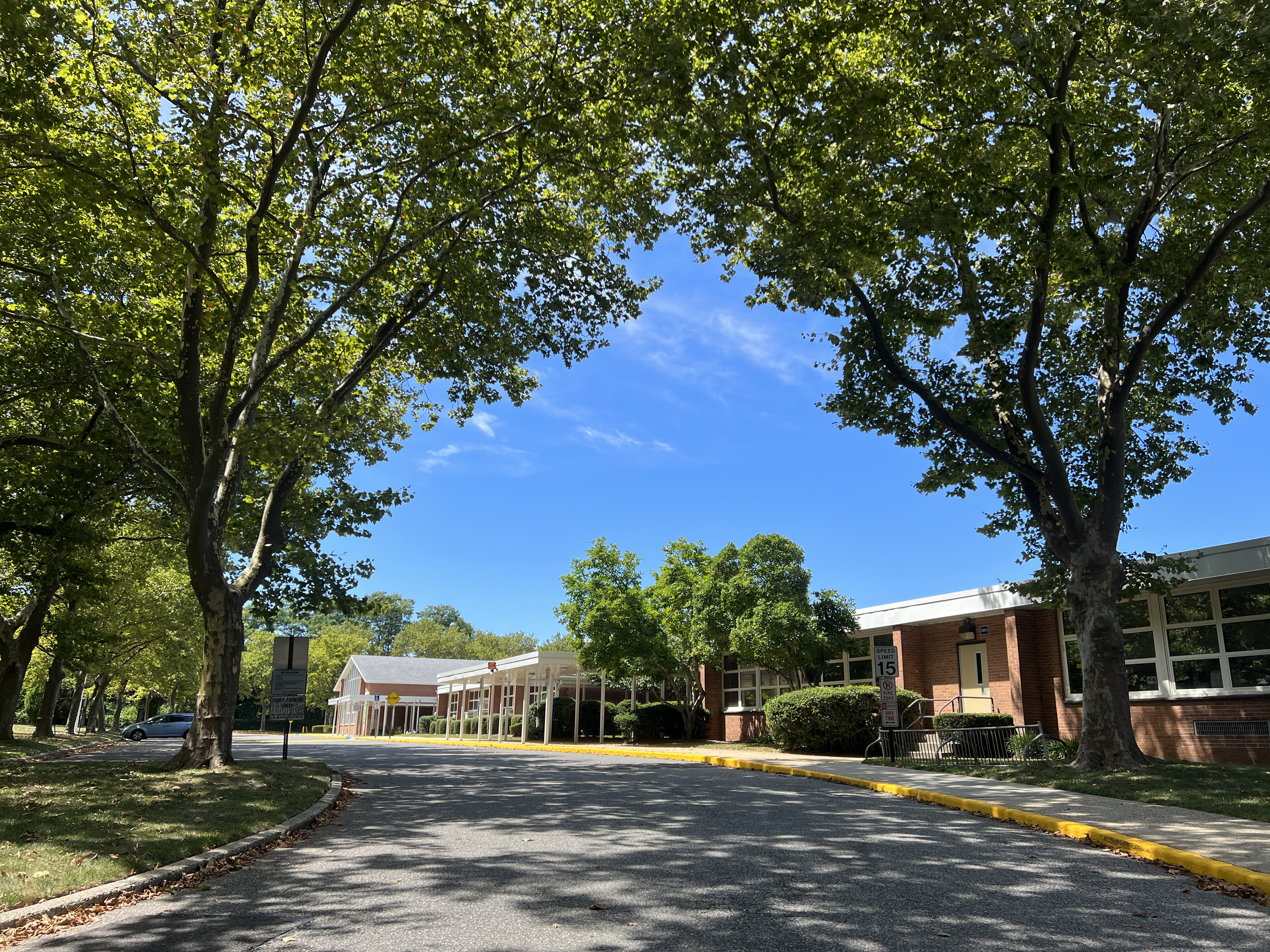
  Guggenheim Elementary School in 2022
- John J. Daly Elementary School
- John Philip Sousa Elementary School
- Manorhaven Elementary School
- South Salem Elementary School
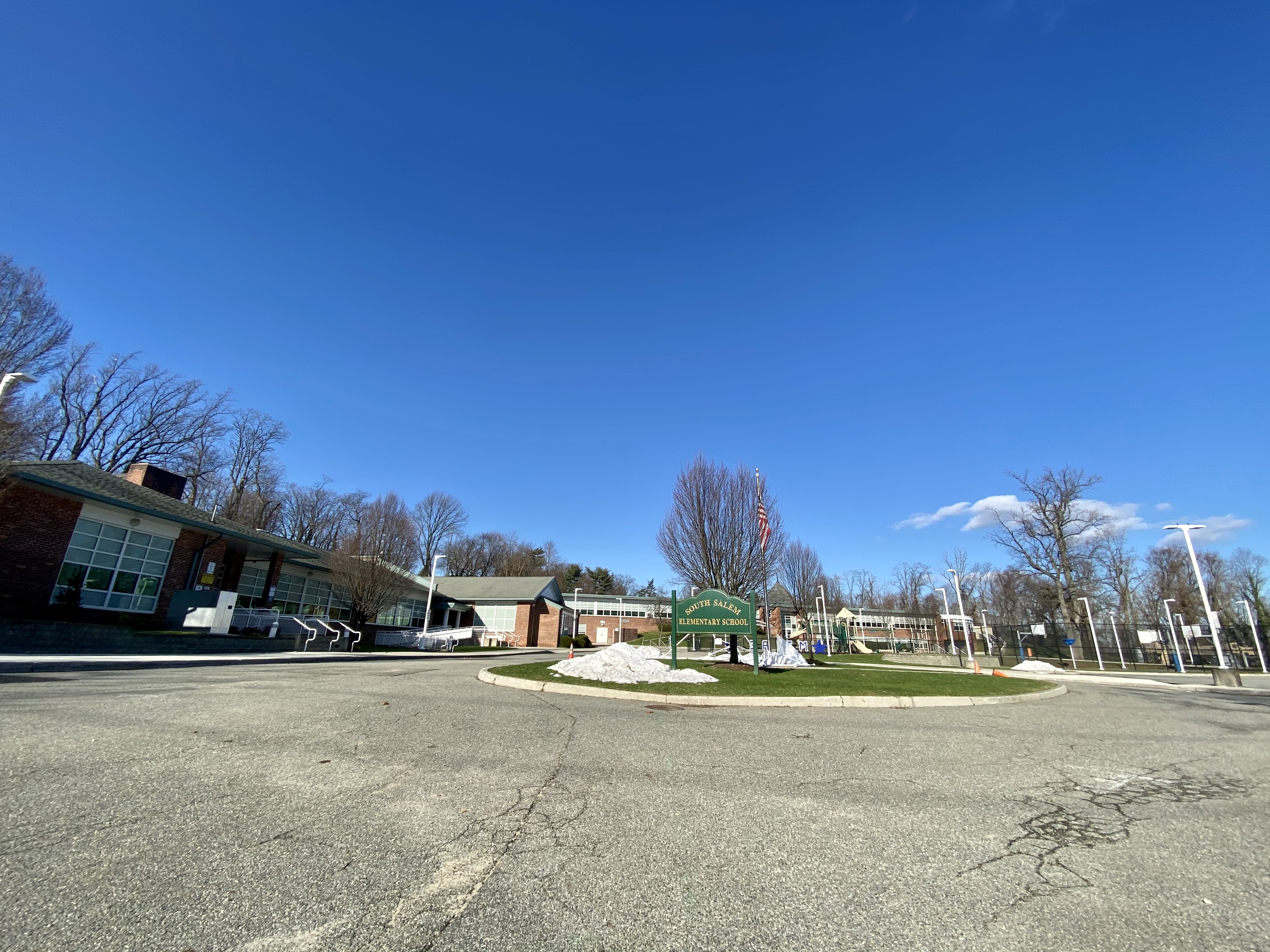
  South Salem Elementary School in 2020

=== Secondary ===
- Carrie Palmer Weber Middle School
- Paul D. Schreiber Senior High School
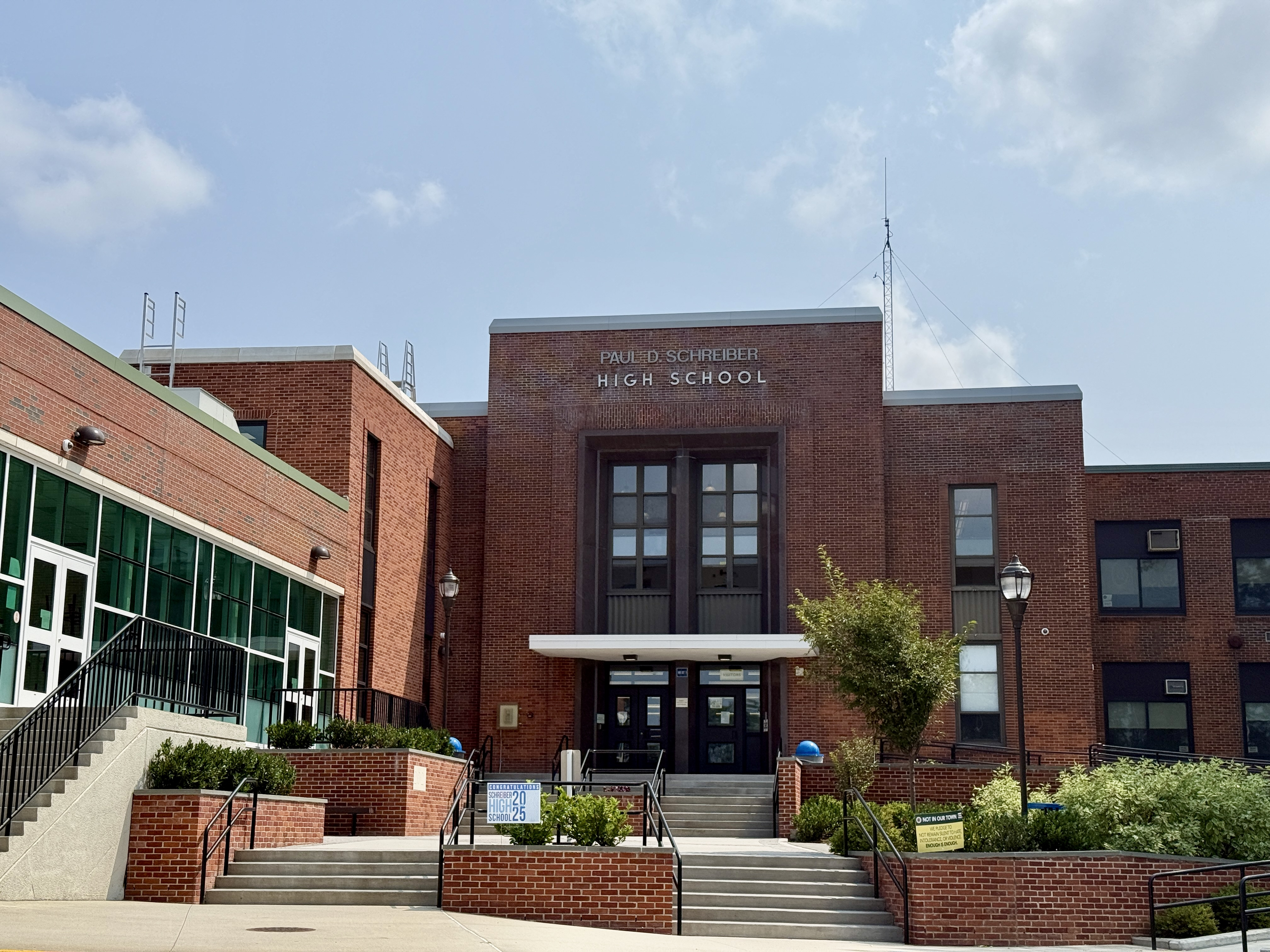
  Paul D. Schreiber Senior High School in 2025

== Demographics ==
As of the 2023-2024 school year, the district had a total of 5,177 enrolled students in kindergarten through 12th grade.

The tables below show the breakdowns of the district's demographics, as of the 2023-2024 school year:

Students, by race/ethnicity:
Race/ethnicity	Number	Percentage
White	3,165	61%
Black or African American	64	1%
Hispanic or Latino	1,152	22%
Asian or Hawaii Native/Other Pacific Islander	550	11%
Native American or Alaska Native	4	0%
Multiracial	242	5%

Students, by gender:
Gender	Number	Percentage
Female	2,509	48%
Male	2,665	51%
Non-Binary	3	1%

Additionally, out of the 5,356 students, 463 (9%) are English Language Learners (ELL), 817 (16%) have at least 1 disability, 1,111 (21%) are economically disadvantaged, and 33 (1%) are homeless.

== See also ==
- List of school districts in New York
- List of Long Island public school districts and schools
- Roslyn Union Free School District
- Manhasset Union Free School District
