= Great Neck, New York =

Region on Long Island, New York, US

Great Neck Madnan's Neck
- Region
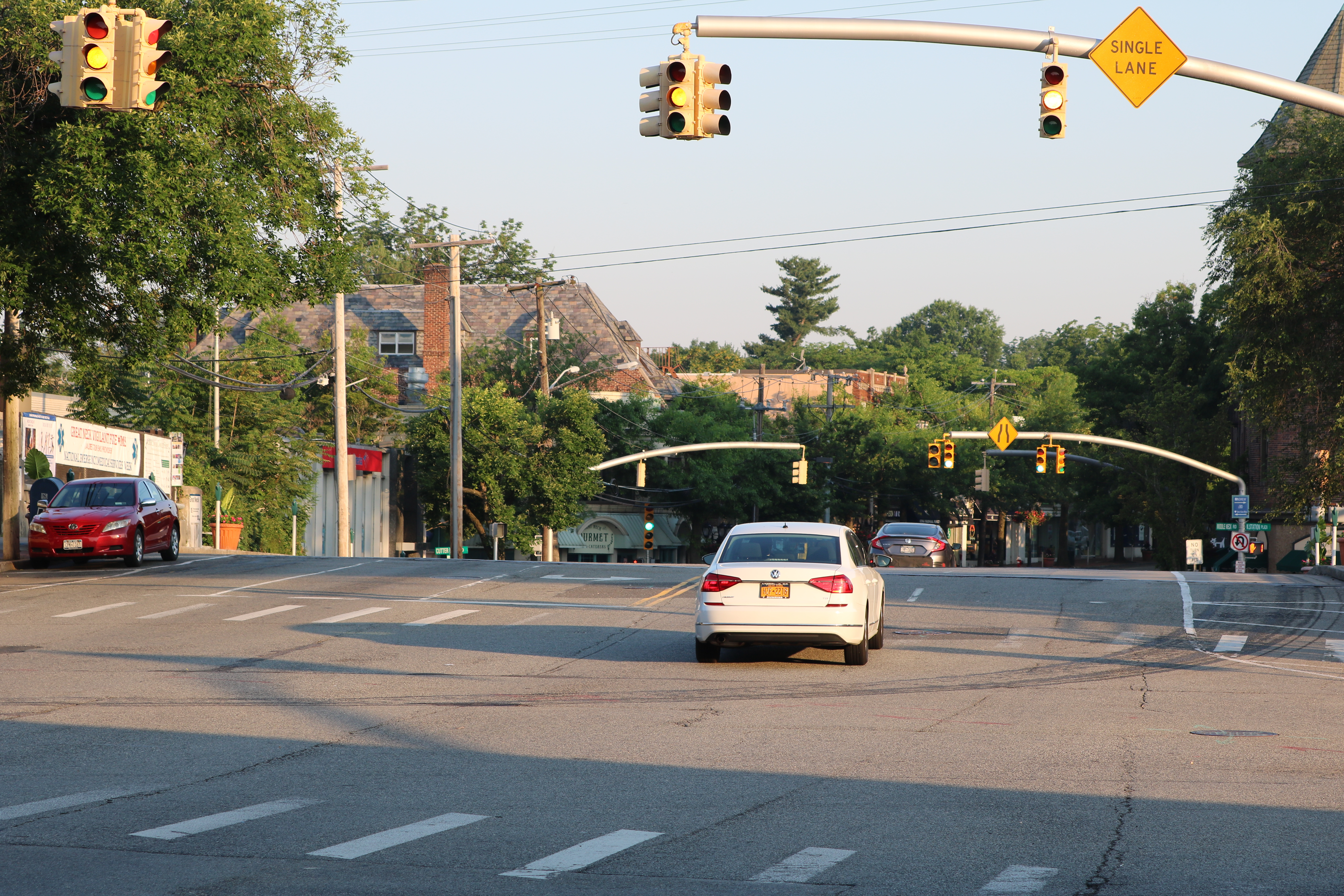
- Middle Neck Road in Great Neck. This road runs along the center of the Great Neck Peninsula.
- Nickname: West Egg
- Location on Long Island Location within the state of New York
- Coordinates: 40°47′14″N 73°43′38″W
- Country: United States
- State: New York
- County: Nassau
- Town: North Hempstead
- Time zone: UTC-5 (Eastern (EST))
  - Summer (DST): UTC-4 (EDT)
- ZIP Codes: 11020–11027
- Area codes: 516, 363
- FIPS code: 36-30169
- GNIS feature ID: 0951636

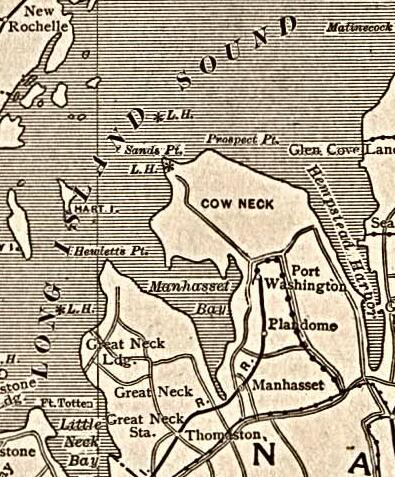
The Great Neck peninsula, bordering Manhasset Bay and Long Island Sound, as seen on a map from 1917

Great Neck is a region contained within Nassau County, New York, on Long Island, which covers a peninsula on the North Shore and includes nine incorporated villages, among them Great Neck, Great Neck Estates, Great Neck Plaza, Kings Point, and Russell Gardens, and a number of unincorporated areas, as well as an area south of the peninsula near Lake Success and North New Hyde Park. The incorporated village of Great Neck had a population of 9,989 at the 2010 census, while the larger Great Neck area comprises a residential community of some 40,000 people in nine villages and hamlets in the town of North Hempstead, of which Great Neck is the northwestern quadrant. Great Neck has five ZIP Codes (11020–11024), which are united by a park district. The ZIP code (11040) represents the part of North New Hyde Park zoned into GNPS. It is also connected with the library district and a school district with which the core five ZIP Codes also share privileges.

The hamlets are census-designated places that consolidate various unincorporated areas. They are statistical entities and are not recognized locally. However, there are locally recognized neighborhoods within the hamlet areas, such as Harbor Hills, Saddle Rock Estates, University Gardens, and Manhasset.

The Manhasset neighborhood (in ZIP Code 11030) is not considered part of Great Neck. The part of the hamlet of Manhasset that is considered part of Great Neck includes the Great Neck Manor neighborhood. Great Neck Gardens is featured on many maps as a name of one such hamlet, but that name is seldom used by local residents.

== History ==
=== Pre-colonization and colonization ===
Long before Dutch and English settlers arrived on the peninsula of Great Neck in the 17th century, bands of Lenape Native Americans inhabited the shorelines of the peninsula. They became known as the Mattinecock people, identified with the geographic area. They fished in Long Island Sound and used the waterways as trade corridors to other Native American groups.

In 1681 some of the European settlers held their first town meeting. They referred to present-day Great Neck as Menhaden-Ock. It is speculated that they chose this name because of the large amount of fish in the area. With the arrival of the European settlers on the peninsula in the 1640s, Menhaden-Ock evolved into Madnan's Neck. By 1670, Madnan's Neck had further evolved into the current name Great Neck.

Local European legend has it that "Madnan's Neck" is named after Anne (or Nan) Hutchinson. It is said that Anne Hutchinson tried to take over what is considered present-day Kings Point upon her arrival to the peninsula. However, she could not procure a land grant or deed for the land that she desired. Her temper supposedly earned her the nickname Mad Nan.

On November 18, 1643, the Hempstead Plains, which included the peninsula of Great Neck, was sold to the Reverend Robert Fordham and John Carman. In the beginning, the Mattinecock Indians and the European settlers cooperated and coexisted very well together. The Mattinecock would teach the settlers their knowledge of the land in exchange for new technology from the settlers. The settlers started using the Indian currency of wampum. However, this peaceful coexistence would not last, and the relationship between the Mattinecock and the settlers quickly began to deteriorate as they competed for resources.

Settlers began complaining of unfriendly Mattinecock behavior, claiming that the natives would damage their homes and hurt their cattle. On November 18, 1659, the settlers passed a law that forced the natives to pay damages for white property that they had damaged. The problem between the settlers and the Mattinecock natives over land and property kept growing and finally came to a head in 1684. A commission of settlers had been elected and given the power to appease the Mattinecock and their leader Tackapousha. Tackapousha was eventually paid off, and received 120 pounds sterling for his land. Tackapousha eventually died, and his body still rests at the Lakeville AME Zion Church's cemetery on Community Drive, across the street from North Shore University Hospital. The Lakeville AME Zion Church is one of the oldest churches in New York State.

The first European to look upon the Long Island peninsula of Great Neck was Captain Adrian Block of the Great Dutch West India Company in 1614, when his men were stranded on the southern tip of Manhattan Island, after their ship Tiger sank shortly after the landing. The captain and his men built a ship called the Onrust out of timber and salvaged parts from Tiger. When the sailors departed, they sailed around Long Island, mapping it as they passed. Later, the Reverend Robert Fordham and John Carman first came to Great Neck from New Haven by use of Long Island Sound. During this trip, the deal with Chief Tackapousha was reached. One year later, on November 16 William Kieft granted a special land patent for the territory, and permission for the community's incorporation. William Kieft was the director general of New Netherland, and the patent that he granted gave the people of the peninsula the right to religious self-determination. The new community's political independence was so great that the only town officials in any way elected by the Dutch government or its magistrates, had first to be nominated by a town meeting.

The Dutch controlled Long Island from 1642 to 1664. Under Dutch rule, constables, local officers, nominated magistrates, and overseers were elected by town meetings and passed legislation. On December 21, 1656, Peter Stuyvesant, who was the director general of New Netherland after William Kieft, appointed the first two magistrates of Hempstead. These two men were John Seaman and Richard Guildersleeve.

The local government of Madnan's Neck at the time was extremely active in passing new laws. They imposed a liquor tax: half of that tax paid for the town's supply of ammunition, with the other half going to education. They also published a religious code of ethics, which included requirements for conduct on holidays that applied to the entire town. Punishments for poor conduct were detailed, including fines, corporal punishment, and banishment. The first reported instance of sexual misconduct in the peninsula's history was recorded on October 3, 1659, against Henry Linnington. After the threat of being banished, Linnington was ultimately allowed to stay, on the condition that he reformed his behavior.

Around this time, the boundaries of Madnan's Neck and Hempstead grew increasingly apart. As the population of Madnan's Neck grew, independence from Hempstead became increasingly realistic. In 1672, Robert Jackson, a well-known man in the community of Madnan's Neck, defeated Simon Seryon in the election for constable of Hempstead by a count of 39 to 31. However, Seryon was still declared the victor, due to governmental corruption and back door bribery. Incensed by the fixed election and obviously staged result, residents of Madnan's Neck petitioned the governor for separation, but their request was denied.

Finally, on June 9, 1687, the government of the New Netherland ordered that Madnan's Neck be "separate, hereafter from Hempstead". The town was given its own marshal, and its own constable. The first constable of Madnan's Neck was Edward Hare, who had aided the movement for the community's independence. Over time, Madnan's Neck grew increasingly politically independent. Few communities of Madnan's Neck's size had their own highway, grist mill, minister, constable, and marshal, yet Madnan's Neck, emerged from Hempstead as a fully functioning town.

=== Later development ===
During the late 19th century, Great Neck was made the rail head of the New York and Flushing Railroad. It gradually developed from a farm village into a commuter town, where many residents traveled to Manhattan and other points to work.

Great Neck of the 1920s—in particular the Village of Kings Point - is considered the setting for F. Scott Fitzgerald's novel The Great Gatsby. The author referred to the area as "West Egg," in counterpoint to Manor Haven/Sands Point, which was considered more posh and was designated as "East Egg" (the next peninsula to the east reaching into Long Island Sound). Great Neck was a site of extravagant parties symbolizing the decadence of the Roaring Twenties extending from New York City to then-remote suburbs. The Great Gatsby's themes and characters reflected the transformation of Great Neck between the wars and before the stock market crash. New wealth was moving into the area and young people wanted to celebrate.

Successful show-business figures such as Eddie Cantor, Sid Caesar, and the Marx Brothers bought homes in the hamlet and eventually established it as a haven for Jewish Americans who were descendants of immigrants from Brooklyn and the Bronx.

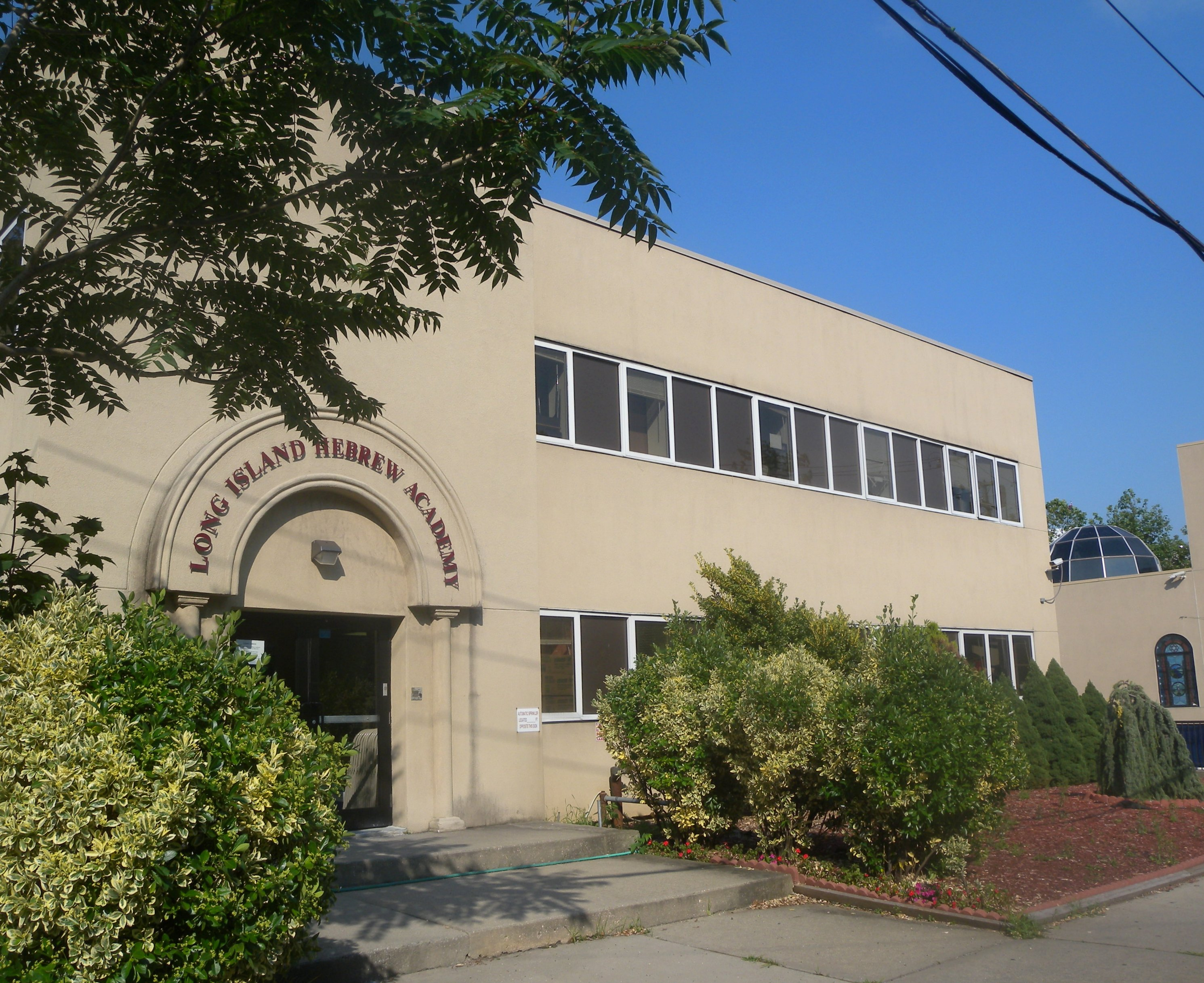
Long Island Hebrew Academy

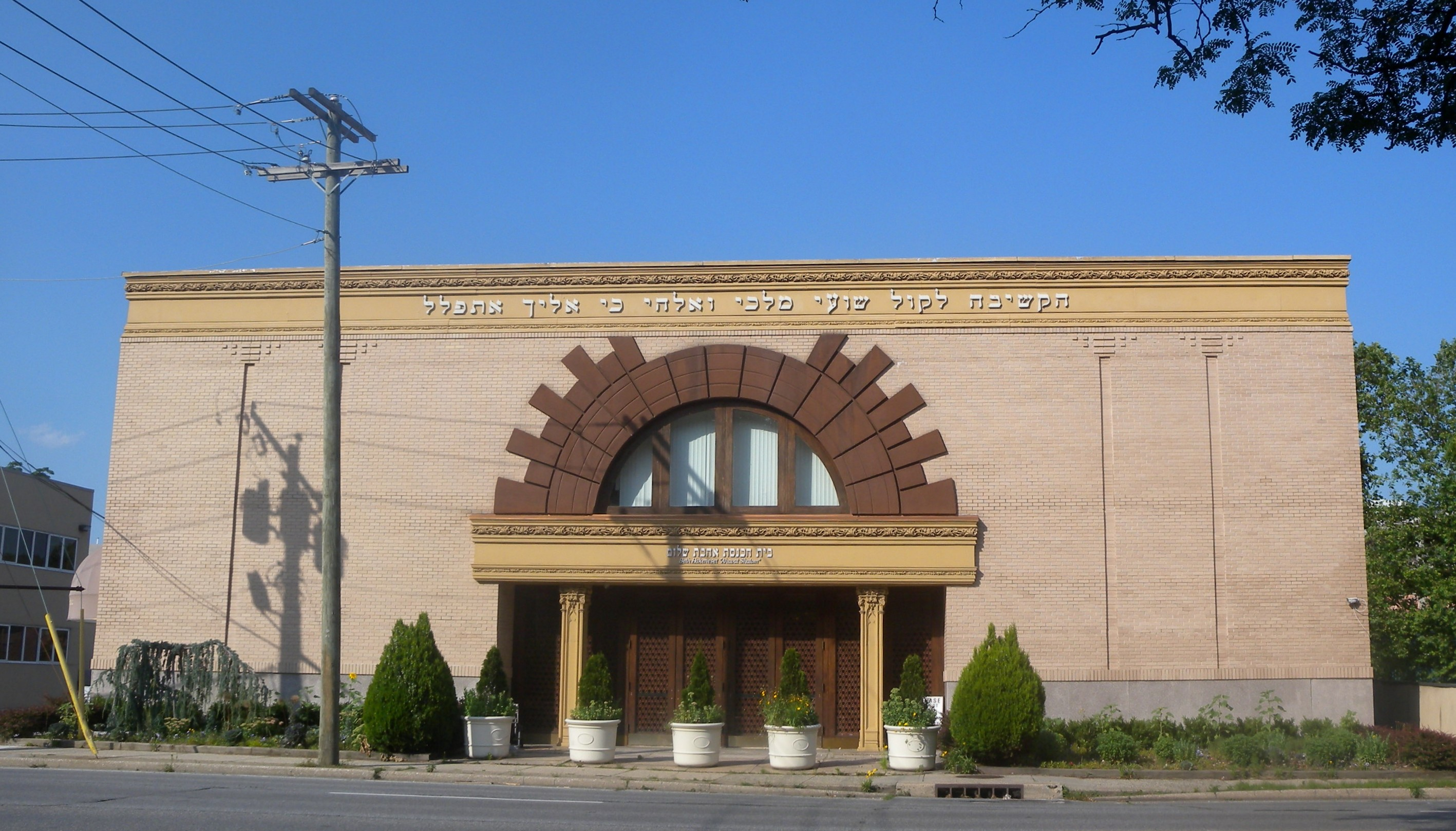
Beth Hakeneset Synagogue

In 1943, the United States Merchant Marine Academy was founded at the former location of Walter P. Chrysler's palatial estate in Kings Point. It was the only higher education institution in Great Neck.

Following the end of World War II, pent up housing demand and a growing economy resulted in many ethnic groups leaving crowded conditions in Manhattan and Brooklyn for newer houding in the suburbs of Nassau County, including Great Neck. Among them were numerous Ashkenazi Jews. They founded many synagogues and community groups and pushed for high standards in the town's public schools. Decades later, Jay Cantor's novel Great Neck (2003) explored the drive of those postwar migrants trying to secure the brightest futures for their children.

During construction of the current headquarters of the United Nations from 1947 through 1952, the UN was temporarily headquartered at the Sperry Corporation facility in the Great Neck community of Lake Success due to its proximity to Manhattan. Eleanor Roosevelt headed the UN Commission on Human Rights at this location.

During the 1960s, many residents frequented the local pool and ice-skating complex, Parkwood. But as homeowners built their own in-ground pools, patronage declined. Local attention returned to the complex when the ice-skating rink was renamed in honor of Andrew Stergiopoulos, a local resident who was killed in the 9/11 attack on the World Trade Towers in Manhattan. The Great Neck complex was extensively renovated in 2007 and 2008.

Beginning in the 1980s, an influx of Persian Jews who fled persecution from the 1979 Islamic Revolution settled in Great Neck. Since the late 1990s, numerous East Asians, predominantly ethnic Chinese and Korean of later immigration waves, have been moving into the area. The high quality public school education is a key attractor for many of those moving in (the GNPS school district has been ranked by Niche as a #1 public school district in New York in previous years and some of its schools have received Blue Ribbons).

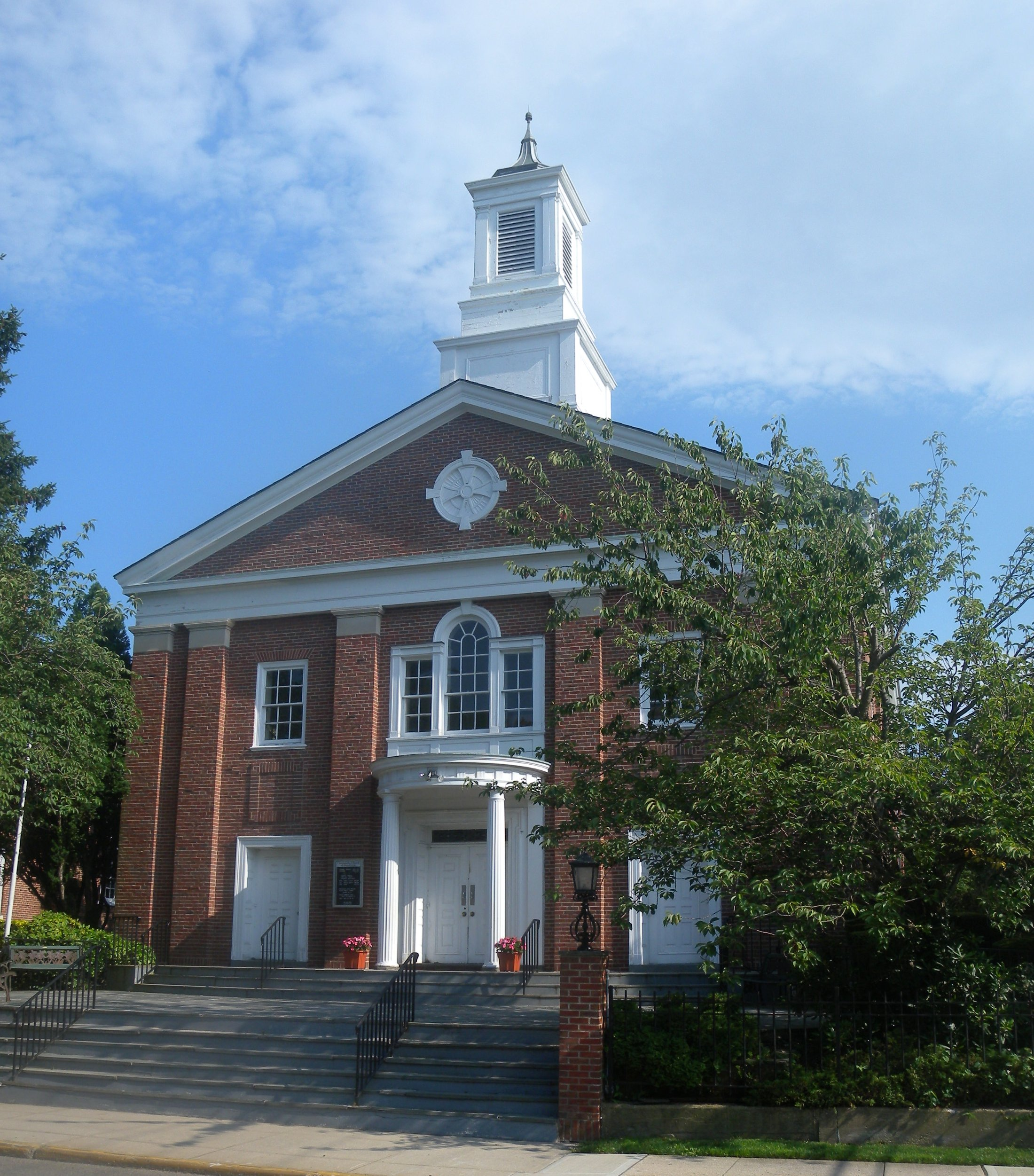
Community Church of Great Neck

== List of communities ==
Great Neck consists of 9 incorporated villages and 7 unincorporated hamlets:

- Village of Great Neck
- Great Neck Estates
- Great Neck Plaza
- Kensington
- Kings Point
- Lake Success
- Russell Gardens
- Saddle Rock
- Thomaston
- Great Neck Gardens
- Harbor Hills
- Saddle Rock Estates
- University Gardens
- North New Hyde Park (ZONED for GNPS)

The westernmost portion of the Hamlet of Manhasset – Spinney Hill – lies between the villages of Thomaston and Lake Success and has Great Neck postal codes (11020).

== Transportation ==
Great Neck is a 30 to 40-minute commute from Manhattan's Penn Station on the Port Washington Branch of the Long Island Rail Road via the Great Neck station. Some peak LIRR trains terminate at the station. Nassau Inter-County Express connects the villages to the train station and offers service to several destinations in Nassau County and Queens from the station, while the southern part of the Great Neck area can also directly access the Q46 New York City Bus on Union Turnpike at the border with Glen Oaks and the Q12 bus on Northern Boulevard at the border with Little Neck.

== Emergency services ==
The Village of Great Neck is protected by the Nassau County Police Department's Sixth Precinct, as is the rest of Great Neck except for the villages of Great Neck Estates, Kings Point, Kensington and Lake Success. Those villages have their own police departments, which are reinforced by the NCPD during any criminal activity, event, or other incident that falls outside the realm of "routine."

Great Neck is served by three all-volunteer fire departments. The Great Neck Alert Fire Company was founded in 1901. The Great Neck Vigilant Fire Company was founded in 1904. Company 3 of the Manhasset-Lakeville Fire Department was founded in 1912, and Company 4 of the M-LFD was founded in 1926. Alert covers the northern part of the peninsula, including the Village of Great Neck, providing fire and heavy rescue response. Alert responds to certain medical emergencies with its heavy rescue truck and provides care before the arrival of an ambulance. Vigilant serves the middle portion of Great Neck with fire and heavy rescue response. The Vigilant Fire Company also provides emergency ambulance services to both its own territory and Alert's. M-LFD Co. 3 and 4 serve the southern part of Great Neck, including the villages of Thomaston and Lake Success. These two companies offer fire and rescue services. The M-LFD Ambulance Unit operates two ambulances out of Co. 3's firehouse. In addition, the Nassau County Police Emergency Ambulance Bureau also provides EMS service to the Manhasset-Lakeville fire district.

== Parks and recreation ==
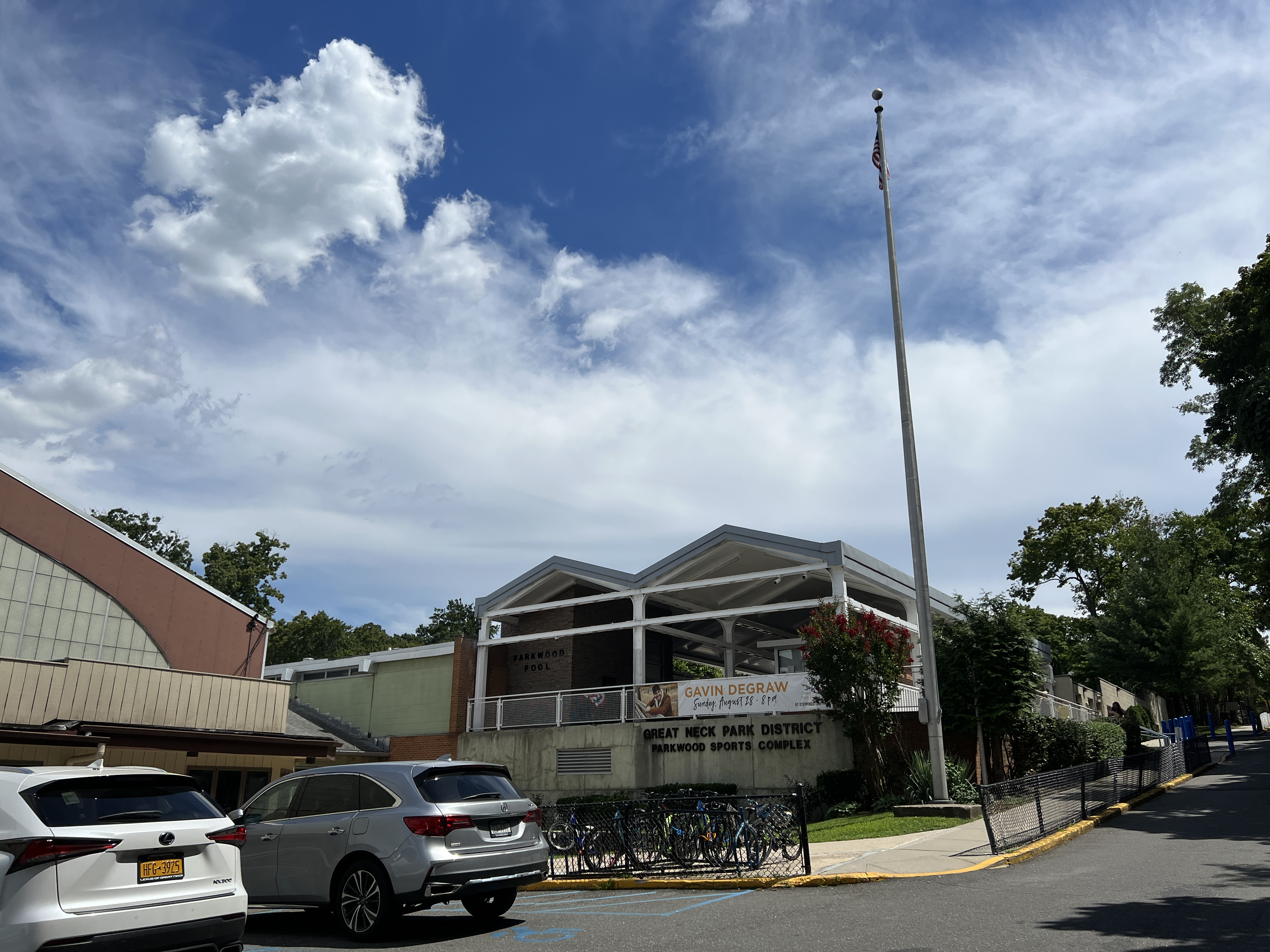
Parkwood Pool in 2022

The Parkwood Pool and skating rink complex, the Village Green and sections of Kings Point Park are managed by the Great Neck Park District. The Park District serves all Great Neck except the villages of Saddle Rock, Great Neck Estates, and Lake Success, and the neighborhoods (not hamlets) of Harbor Hills and University Gardens. Areas not served by the Great Neck Park District have their own facilities for their residents, run by the villages or civic associations. Parkwood can also provide tennis lessons and skating lessons. During the summer it is a part of the Great Neck day camp program, where young campers use the swimming pool facilities.

== Economy ==
Great Neck has consistently been recognized as one of the most affluent towns both regionally and nationally.

== Culture and tourism ==
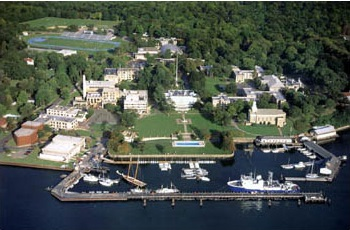
The United States Merchant Marine Academy

Great Neck serves primarily as a "bedroom" community for New York City. As such, it contains few "touristy" attractions. Notable exceptions include:

- Saddle Rock Grist Mill, a historical grain-mill powered by tides; known to have been in operation as early as the 18th century.
- United States Merchant Marine Academy in Kings Point
- Steppingstone Park, formerly part of the Walter P. Chrysler estate in Kings Point. Offers summer concerts every Saturday night.
- Kings Point Park
- Great Neck Arts Center
- Great Neck Plaza Shopping District
- Great Neck Plaza Promenade Nights – Several summer nights in Great Neck's downtown area, streets are closed off and local restaurants bring seating outdoors for a festive evening of dining, live music, and entertainment.
- Handful of Keys, a trompe l'oeil (fool the eye) mural painted by William Cochran located in Great Neck Plaza.
- F. Scott Fitzgerald's House was loosely referred to in his novel, The Great Gatsby. "West Egg" referred to Kings Point, a prosperous neighborhood in the northern part of Great Neck, once known for its prevalence of "new money."

== Education ==
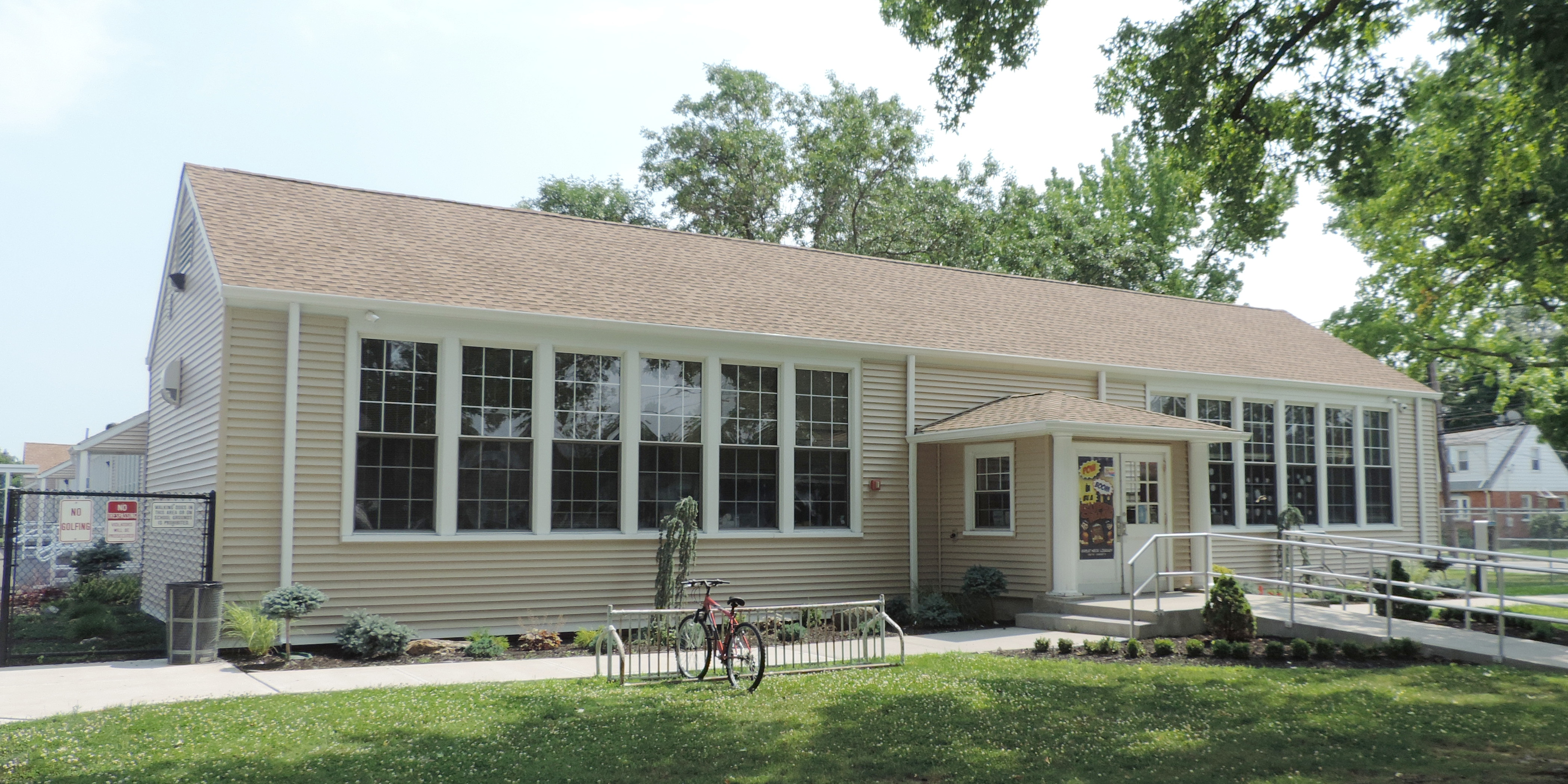
The Parkville Branch of the Great Neck Public Library

Great Neck Library is the public library system serving the community of Great Neck. There are four branches, located throughout the Great Neck area: Main, Station, Parkville, and Lakeville.

The Great Neck Union Free School District is the school district of most of Great Neck. It also includes parts of North New Hyde Park and Manhasset Hills. A small part of eastern Great Neck around Northern Boulevard is part of the Manhasset Union Free School District, whose students attend Manhasset High School. About 6,200 students, grades K-12, attend the Great Neck Public Schools. There are three high schools: Great Neck North, Great Neck South, and Village (a small alternative high school). There is a district-wide alternative high school program, SEAL Academy (Supportive Environment for All Learners). There are also two middle schools and four elementary schools. Students have diverse backgrounds; they come from more than 40 countries and represent a broad socioeconomic range.

Colleges:

- United States Merchant Marine Academy

High schools:

- Great Neck North High School
- Great Neck South High School
- Great Neck Village High School (Alternative high school)

Middle schools:

- Great Neck North Middle School
- Great Neck South Middle School

Elementary schools:

- E. M. Baker Elementary School
- John F. Kennedy Elementary School
- Lakeville Elementary School
- Saddle Rock Elementary School

Nursery school:

- Parkville School

Adult centers:

- Cumberland
- Clover Drive

Great Neck's two major high schools are rated among the top in the country. Its students have been frequent finalists in the Intel Science Talent Search, and Great Neck has produced several Intel STS winners since 1999. The district has produced several high school winners of the international First Step to the Nobel Prize in Physics, awarded in Poland. In the 2008 Newsweek magazine's annual list of the top 1,300 American high schools, Great Neck South was ranked 49th, and Great Neck North was ranked 68th.

Private schools in the region include North Shore Hebrew Academy and Silverstein Hebrew Academy.

At one time, the Japanese Weekend School of New York (ニューヨーク補習授業校) conducted lessons in Great Neck.

== Notable people ==
- Dan Ahdoot, comedian
- David Baltimore (born 1938), Nobel Prize-winning biologist and former president of Caltech (former resident and high school graduate).
- David Levien & Brian Koppelman, filmmaking duo
- Nikki Blonsky (born 1988), actress who starred as Tracy Turnblad in the 2007 version of Hairspray and in Harold, filmed in Great Neck North High School and Middle School.
- Enea Bossi Sr. (1888–1963), Italian-American engineer and aviation pioneer
- Oscar Brand (1920–2016), folk singer and songwriter (resident)
- Donald Brian (1877–1948), Broadway actor, singer, and dancer
- Fanny Brice (1891–1951), comedian, entertainer, theater and film actress, Funny Girl
- Carol Bruce (1919–2007), singer and theater, film and television actress
- Algis Budrys (1931–2008), science-fiction author and editor (former resident)
- Sid Caesar (1922–2014), television pioneer known for Your Show of Shows (resident)
- Barrie Chase (born 1933) , dancer and actress
- Maurice Chevalier (1888–1972), actor and entertainer (resident)
- Walter Chrysler (1875–1940), automobile pioneer, founder of the Chrysler Corporation
- Mary L. Cleave (born 1947), Space Shuttle astronaut.
- George M. Cohan (1878–1942), entertainer, playwright, composer, lyricist, actor, singer, dancer, director, and producer (resident)
- Arthur G. Cohen (1930–2014), businessman and real estate developer
- Steven A. Cohen (born 1956), hedge fund manager (SAC Capital), billionaire and owner of the New York Mets (resident)
- Kenneth Cole (born 1954), designer (attended school in Great Neck)
- Francis Ford Coppola, film director (graduated from Great Neck High School North)
- Andrew W. Cordier, Columbia University president (former resident)
- Anthony Cumia, latter half of Opie and Anthony (resident)
- R. J. Cutler (born 1962), filmmaker, documentarian, television producer and theater director
- Thomas DiNapoli, New York State Comptroller (resident)
- Gail Dolgin (1945–2010), filmmaker
- Tad Dorgan (1877–1929), cartoonist
- Shay Doron, first Israeli to play in the Women's National Basketball Association (New York Liberty)
- Will Durant (1885–1981), historian. Author of the multi-volume outline of world history The Story of Civilization.
- Quinn Early, football player drafted by San Diego Chargers (graduated from Great Neck South High School)
- Sam Eshaghoff, real estate developer and investor (graduated from Great Neck North High School)
- Percy Faith (1908–1976), Canadian bandleader, orchestrator, composer and conductor (former resident)
- W. C. Fields (1880–1946), comedian and actor (former resident)
- F. Scott Fitzgerald (1896–1940), author (former resident), lived in Great Neck in the 1920s, at 6 Gateway Drive in Great Neck Estates. He lived here in a modest house not dissimilar to that of Nick, the protagonist of his novel, The Great Gatsby. It is said that Fitzgerald modeled West Egg—the fictional town in which Nick lives—after his own Great Neck (specifically Kings Point) and the atmosphere and lifestyle there; and he modeled East Egg after Great Neck's eastern neighbor, Port Washington, or, more specifically, Sands Point. It is possible to see the actual green light referred to in the book, at Stepping Stone Park. The park is located at the top of the Great Neck Peninsula.
- Whitey Ford (1928–2020), New York Yankees pitcher (former resident)
- Arnold and Jesse Friedman, subjects of award-winning 2003 documentary Capturing the Friedmans (former residents)
- Julius Genachowski FCC chairman under Obama administration
- Harry Gideonse (1901–1985), President of Brooklyn College, and Chancellor of the New School for Social Research
- Bernie Glow (1926 - 1982), first-call trumpet player and played on thousands of recording sessions
- Jamie Gorelick, Clinton Administration official (former resident)
- Morton Gould, concert pianist (former resident)
- Joseph Peter Grace Sr., businessman (former resident)
- Mark Green, former New York City Public Advocate and mayoral candidate (former resident and high school graduate)
- Jim Gurfein (born 1961), tennis player
- Betty Haas Pfister (1921–2011), aviator
- Ilan Hall, chef and winner of reality television show Top Chef (former resident)
- Oscar Hammerstein II, writer, producer and director of musicals (former resident)
- Dick Heyward, former deputy Director of UNICEF (1914–2005) (former resident)
- Jackie Hoffman, actress, singer and comedian
- Leslie Howard (1893–1943), actor, director and producer
- Christopher Howes, Yale professor in Cardiology and head of Greenwich Hospital Cardiology (grew up in Great Neck)
- Emily Hughes (born 1989), member of the U.S. figure skating team at the 2006 Winter Olympics
- Sarah Hughes (born 1985), gold medalist in figure skating at the 2002 Winter Olympics
- Marion Hutton, singer/actor (former resident)
- Eric Isaacs (born 1957), physicist, director of Argonne National Laboratory
- David Kahn, historian, journalist, and writer on subjects of cryptography and military intelligence
- Anna Kaplan (born 1985), Town of North Hempstead Councilwoman (resident), New York State Senator
- Michael Karlan, founder of the nation's largest networking and socializing group, Professionals in the City (former resident)
- Andy Kaufman (1949–1984), comedian and actor (former resident)
- Edward Keonjian (1909–1999), Armenian-American engineer and "father of microelectronics"
- Alan King (1927–2004), comedian and actor (former resident)
- Andrew Klavan (born 1954), author
- Moogy Klingman (1950–2011), musician and songwriter
- Josh Kopelman, entrepreneur (former resident)
- Dave Kufeld (born 1958), first Orthodox Jew selected in the NBA draft
- Christopher Lambert, actor (born in Great Neck)
- Morris S. Levy, television and film producer (resident)
- Jack Liebowitz, co-founder of DC Comics; lived in the Saddle Rock neighborhood.
- Ring Lardner, sports columnist and short story writer (former resident)
- Edna Luby (1884–1928), entertainer, lived in Great Neck
- Doug McIntyre, author, radio host, producer
- The Marx Brothers, stars of vaudeville and movies (former residents)
- Mimi Michaels, actress
- Minae Mizumura, novelist, essayist, critic, based in Tokyo (former resident)
- Bobby Muller, Vietnam War veteran and anti-war activist (grew up in Great Neck)
- Louise Nevelson, abstract sculptor (former resident)
- Paul Newman (1925–2008) , actor (former resident)
- Ted Nierenberg (1923–2009), founder of Dansk International Designs, created in the garage of his Great Neck home.
- Roy Niederhoffer (born 1966), founder and President of R. G. Niederhoffer Capital Investments, philanthropist, Chairman of the New York City Opera
- Eugene O'Neill (1888–1953), playwright (former resident)
- Charlotte Blair Parker, playwright; writing under pen name Lottie Blair Parker, remembered most for three plays produced between 1897 and 1906: Way Down East, Under Southern Skies and The Redemption of David Corson
- Mazi Melesa Pilip (born 1978 or 1979), Ethiopian-born American politician
- Larry Poons, abstract painter (graduated from Great Neck High School [North])
- Neil Portnow, President of the National Academy of Recording Arts & Sciences (former resident)
- Dan Raviv, author and CBS TV and radio correspondent who hosts the CBS News Weekend Roundup (former resident)
- Daniella Rabbani, Yiddish theatre actress
- Anne Ramsey (1929–1988), actress, known for such films as The Goonies (1985) and Throw Momma from the Train (1987), and was an Academy Award nominee, Golden Globe Award nominee, and a two-time Saturn Award winner
- Peter Rennert (born 1958), tennis player
- Jimmy Roberts, composer for musical theater as well as a pianist and entertainer (graduate of Great Neck North High School)
- Alan Rosen (born 1969), restaurant and bakery owner, and author
- Bobby Rosengarden (1924–2007), jazz drummer and bandleader (former resident)
- Jordan Rudess, keyboard player for the band Dream Theater (grew up in Great Neck)
- Tamir Sapir, Georgian-born billionaire
- Roxanne Seeman, songwriter and lyricist (graduate of Great Neck North High School)
- George Segal (1934–2021), Academy Award-nominated, Primetime Emmy Award-nominated, and Golden Globe Award-winning actor
- David Seidler, screenwriter of "The King's Speech," 2011 Oscar winner; Great Neck H.S. graduate, 1955
- Burt Shavitz, co-founder of Burt's Bees
- Sarah Sherman, comedian and cast member on Saturday Night Live
- Talia Shire, actress, known for The Godfather and Rocky films, and a two-time Academy Award nominee (born in Lake Success)
- Jared Siegel (Jared Evan), singer, songwriter, and producer
- Elie Siegmeister, composer (resident)
- Laurie Simmons, artist, photographer and filmmaker
- Harry F. Sinclair, oil industrialist (former resident)
- Helen Slater (born 1963), actress
- Alfred P. Sloan, president of General Motors (former resident)
- Tim Sommer, musician in Hugo Largo and record executive and producer
- Seth Swirsky, songwriter and author
- Jon Taffer, host and co-executive producer of Spike TV reality series Bar Rescue
- Norma Talmadge, actress (former resident)
- Richard Tucker, operatic tenor (former resident)
- Louis Uchitelle, journalist with The New York Times (former resident)
- Sim Van der Ryn, architect, researcher and educator, who has applied principles of physical and social ecology to architecture and environmental design.
- William Kissam Vanderbilt II, railroad executive and yachtsman (former resident)
- Robert Varkonyi, World Series of Poker champion (resident)
- Sam Warner (1887–1927), one of four brothers who were co-founders of Warner Bros.
- Mordecai Waxman (1917–2002), prominent rabbi in the Conservative movement and of Temple Israel of Great Neck.
- Max Weber (1881–1961), one of the first American Cubist painters
- Michael H. Weber (born 1978), screenwriter
- Mort Weisinger, editor (Batman, Superman, Thrilling Wonder Stories)
- Charlie Williams, traded by the New York Mets along with cash for Willie Mays; did not make the Great Neck South Senior baseball team as a senior
- P. G. Wodehouse (1881–1975), English comic writer (former resident).
- Bruce Wolosoff (born 1955), composer, pianist and educator (former resident)
- Herman Wouk (1915–2019), author (former resident)
- Harris Wulfson (1974–2008), composer, instrumentalist and software engineer (graduated from Great Neck South High School)
- Richard Wyckoff (1873-1934), founder and publisher (The Magazine of Wall Street), built the Wyckoff Estate on West Shore Road in Kings Point, New York
- Chic Young (1901–1973), cartoonist (created Blondie in his Great Neck studio in summer of 1930)
- Michael Zimmerman (born 1970), tennis player

== See also ==
- Cow Neck Peninsula
- Rockaway Peninsula
