= Donald W. Davis =

American businessman

- Born: June 10, 1921; Springfield, Massachusetts
- Died: September 11, 2010 (aged 89)
- Education: Penn State University, Harvard Business School
- Occupation: Former CEO of Stanley Works (now Stanley Black & Decker)

Donald Walter Davis Jr. (June 10, 1921 – September 11, 2010) was an American businessman who oversaw the growth of Stanley Works (now Stanley Black & Decker) in his 40-year career with the company, and was chief executive officer from 1966 to 1988. During his tenure, he supervised the company's transformation from focusing on the traditional commercial uses of the firm's products to target the nascent do it yourself home improvement market.

== Early life ==
Davis was born on June 10, 1921, in Springfield, Massachusetts. His father, Donald W. Davis Sr., left a 17-year career as an advertising manager and director to become a teacher of advertising at Penn State's College of Communications, which he helped found.

The younger Davis attended Penn State and earned a degree in journalism before enlisting in the United States Navy during World War II. After completing his military service, Davis attended Harvard Business School using his benefits under the G.I. Bill.

== Stanley Works career ==
Davis was hired by Stanley Works in 1948 as its general manager of labor relations, beginning a career with that company that would last for almost four decades. After 18 years with the company and having been the firm's executive vice president, Davis was named as president and CEO of Stanley Works in April 1966, succeeding John C. Cairns who had been with Stanley for 42 years.

During his tenure as CEO, employment at Stanley doubled to 20,000, while sales went from $230 million in 1966 to $1.9 billion in 1989, the year after he retired as CEO.

== DIY trend ==
Having been to England during the 1960s, where the do-it-yourself market was already in existence, Davis sought to bring that trend to the United States, arguing that homeowners doing construction projects on their own would want to use the same quality tools that professionals were using. He coined the company slogan "Stanley helps you do things right".

Facing increasing competition from Asian manufacturers who could produce quality tools and sell them for 40% less than Stanley was charging, Davis responded with cuts in labor costs through attrition and layoffs to allow prices to drop to competitive levels. Though increasing numbers of the company's employees were employed around the world, Davis sought to keep the firm rooted in New England by establishing a new corporate headquarters in New Britain, Connecticut, saying, "I think of us as an international company headquartered here", avoiding the word "global" as "it gives the impression of rootlessness".

Davis had been active on the New Britain board of education and his six children had attended the local public schools. As recounted by Louis Uchitelle in his 2006 book The Disposable American: Layoffs and Their Consequences, after relocating to a summer house on Martha's Vineyard, Davis would frequently make the trip to New Britain by ferry and car but started cutting back his visits by the late 1990s as coming face-to-face with former Stanley employees became too painful and "much too personal".

After retiring from Stanley in 1988, Davis taught for over 20 years at the MIT Sloan School of Management, lecturing on the subjects of leadership and ethics. He moved from New Britain to homes in Martha's Vineyard and Hobe Sound, Florida.

Davis died at age 89 on September 11, 2010. The cause of death was lymphoma, a condition he had been treated for successfully 30 years earlier. Davis was survived by his wife, Virginia Cooper Davis, three daughters, three sons, and 12 grandchildren.
