= List of awards won by The New York Times =

The New York Times has won many awards. This list is up to date as of April 2018. (Note: This list includes awards won by The New York Times Magazine and The New York Times, and makes no distinction between the two.) (Note: This list includes all information available online. Some awards, such as the Cabot awards do not have an available list, and thus may be incomplete.) (Note: This list does not include awards won by the Boston Globe when The New York Times Company owned it.)

== Pulitzer Prizes ==
The New York Times has been awarded 133 Pulitzer Prizes, more than any other newspaper. They won their first prize in 1918 for complete and accurate coverage of World War I, and their most recent in 2018.

== SABEW Best in Business ==
Year	Description
	Denotes being a finalist, who did not win

Year	Category	Article	Author(s)	Citations
2007	Overall excellence	N/A	The New York Times Staff	
2007	Breaking News Coverage	“Google’s YouTube deal”	Andrew Ross Sorkin, Matt Richtel, Miguel Helft and John Markoff	
2007	Enterprise	“Very rich are leaving the merely rich behind”	Louis Uchitelle	
2007	Projects	“Leaky oil royalties”	Edmund L. Andrews	
2007	Columns	N/A	Gretchen Morgenson	
2009	General Excellence	N/A	The New York Times Staff	
2009	General Excellence- Websites	N/A	N/A	
2009	Business Reporting - Breaking News	”The G.M. Bankruptcy”	N/A	
2009	Enterprise	“The Burger That Shattered Her Life”	Michael Moss	
2009	Columns	N/A	David Leonhardt	
2009	Columns	N/A	David Carr	
2009	Projects	"Toxic Waters"	Charles Duhigg	
2009	Projects	“Driven to Distraction”	Matt Richtel	
2009	Online Excellence- Breaking News	"The G.M. Bankruptcy"	N/A	
2009	Online Excellence- Projects	"Living With Less"	N/A	
2009	Audio/Video Reports	“Flipped: Inside the Private Equity Game”	Amy O'Leary	
2009	Audio/Video Reports	“The Card Game: The Deal With Overdrafts”	Brent McDonald	
2009	Creative use of Online	“Flipped: Inside the Private Equity Game”	Amy O'Leary	
2010	Personal Finance	“Alina Tugend Personal Finance”		
2010	Breaking News Dailies	“The SEC vs. Goldman Sachs”		
2010	Creative Use Across Multiple Platforms	You Fix the Budget”	N/A	
2010	Creative Use Across Multiple Platforms	“Gulf Oil Spill”	N/A	
2010	Explanatory	“Payback Time”	Benedict Carey	
2010	Feature	“A Bully Finds a Pulpit on the Web”	David Segal	
2010	Feature	“Your Brain on Computers”	Matt Richtel	
2010	General Excellence	N/A	The New York Times Staff	
2010	Opinion/Column	N/A	David Leonhardt	
2010	Opinion/Column	N/A	Gretchen Morgenson	
2011	General Excellence	N/A	New York Times Staff	
2011	Opinion/Column	"Fair Game"	Gretchen Morgenson	
2011	Opinion/Column	"The Media Equation"	David Carr	
2011	Breaking News	MF Global Bankruptcy	The New York Times Staff	
2011	Explanatory	"Drilling Down- Natural Gas"	Ian Urbina	
2011	Feature	"Dirty Little Secrets of Search"	David Segal	
2012	Investigative	"Wal-Mart Abroad"	David Barstow	
2012	Personal Finance	"You For Sale"	Natasha Singer	
2012	Commentary	N/A	James Stewart	
2012	Explanatory	"Tax and Spending Myths"	Binyamin Appelbaum, Robert Gebbeloff	
2012	Explanatory	"The iEconomy"	Charles Duhigg, Keith Bradsher, David Barboza, David Segal, David Kocieniewski, Bill Vlasic, Hiroko Tabuchi	
2012	Features	"McAfee"	David Segal	
2012	Investigative- Real Estate	"Mortgage"	Jessica Silver-Greenberg	
2012	Investigative- Technology	"Fake Reviews"	David Streitfeild	
2013	International Breaking News	For coverage of the Cyprus financial crisis	Staff of the New York Times	
2013	Innovation	For a series of business graphs	Kevin Quealy, Shan Carter, Archie Tse, Mike Bostock, Matthew Ericson, Hannah Fairfield, Ford Fessenden, Tom Giratikanon, Josh Keller, Alicia Parlapiano, Tim Wallace, Derek Watkins, Jeremy White, Josh Williams, Karen Yourish	
2013	Newspapers Breaking News	“JP Morgan Settlement.”	Jessica Silver-Greenberg, Ben Protess, Peter Eavis	
2013	Explanatory	"House Edge."	Gretchen Morgenson, David Kocieniewski, Robert Gebeloff	
2013	Commentary	N/A	James Stewart	
2013	General Excellence	N/A	The New York Times Business staff	
2013	Real Estate	"Foreclosure/Mortgage Abuse."	Jessica Silver-Greenberg, Ben Protess	
2013	Social Media	For effective use of social media	Hanna Ingber	
2013	Technology	"China Hacking"	Nicole Perlroth, David Barboza, David Sanger, Michael Schmidt	
2014	Innovation	For a collection of economic tools and visualizations	Gregor Aisch, Wilson Andrews, Jeremy Ashkenas, Matthew Bloch, Mike Bostock, Shan Carter, Haeyoun Park, Alicia Parlapiano, Archie Tse	
2014	International Breaking News	For Alibaba Coverage	Michael J. de la Merced, Neil Gough, Andrew Jacobs, Karl Russell	
2014	Personal Finance	"Driven Into Debt"	Jessica Silver-Greenberg, Michael Corkery	
2014	Commentary	For his columns	Eduardo Porter	
2014	Explanatory	“The New Smoke.”	Matt Richtel, Sabrina Tavernise	
2014	Investigative	"Fatal Flaws"	Danielle Ivory, Rebecca R. Ruiz, Hiroko Tabuchi, Bill Vlasic, Matthew L. Wald	
2014	Feature	“The cold, hard lessons of Mobile Home U.”	Gary Rivlin	
2015	Personal Finance	“Airbnb Horror Story Points to Need for Precautions”	Ron Lieber	
2015	Commentary	For his columns on technology	Farhad Manjoo	
2015	Explanatory	"Inside Amazon"	Jodi Kantor, David Streitfeld	
2015	Feature	"The Outlaw Ocean"	Ian Urbina	
2015	Investigative	"Beware the Fine Print"	Jessica Silver-Greenberg, Michael Corkery, Robert Gebeloff	
2015	Real Estate	"Towers of Secrecy"	Louise Story, Stephanie Saul	

== Peabody Awards ==
Year	Name	Description	Notes
1951	New York Times Youth Forum	It featured "unrehearsed discussion by students selected from private, public and parochial schools, on topics ranging from the political, educational and scientific to the international and the United Nations."	
1956	Personal Award to Jack Gould	For "his outstanding contribution to radio and television through his New York Times writings".	
2003	FRONTLINE: A Dangerous Business	A joint investigation by the New York Times, the Canadian Broadcasting Corporation, and WGBH's Frontline about the conditions faced by workers at McWayne Inc.	
2008	NYTimes.com	Citation: "Aggressively and creatively adding sound and moving images to its traditional package of news and features, The New York Times has stepped forward as an innovator in online journalism. Its website exemplifies a new age for the press, expanding its role in ways unimaginable only a few years ago."	
2012	Snow Fall	"Snow Fall: The Avalanche at Tunnel Creek", a 17,000-word multimedia online feature story by John Branch. Also won a Pulitzer Prize.	
2013	A Short History of the Highrise	"Website visitors [are able] to tour 2,500 years of 'vertical living,' from the Tower of Babel to turn-of-the-20th Century New York City tenements to luxury skyscrapers in modern Shanghai."	

== National Magazine Awards ==
Year	Category	Article(s)	Author(s)	Citation
2009	Reporting	"Right at the Edge"	Dexter Filkins	
2010	Reporting	"The Deadly Choices at Memorial	Sheri Fink	
2011	Profile Writing	N/A	N/A	
2011	News and Documentary Photography	N/A	N/A	
2011	Design, Digital Media	N/A	N/A	
2012	Feature Photography	"Vamps, Crooks & Killers	Photographs by Alex Prager, Introduction by A.O. Scott	
2012	Video	"My Family's Experiment in Extreme Schooling,"	Julie Dressner, Shayla Harris and Clifford J. Levy	
2014	Reporting	"The Dream Boat"	Luke Mogelson	
2016	Public Interest	"Worlds Apart"	Nikole Hannah-Jones	
2016	Feature Writing	"I have no choice but to keep looking"	Jennifer Percy	
2016	Essays/Criticism	"David's Ankles"	Sam Anderson	

== Gerald Loeb Award ==
Year	Category	Article(s)	Author(s)	Citation
1985	Deadline and/or Beat Writing	"The Battle for Gulf"	Robert J. Cole	
1996	Deadline and/or Beat Writing	"Coverage of the Media Industry"	Geraldine Fabrikant	
1999	Deadline and/or Beat Writing	"Coverage of the Near Collapse of Long-Term Capital Management"	The New York Times Staff (including Diana B. Henriques)	
2001	Commentary	“Floyd Norris Columns”	Floyd Norris	
2002	Commentary	“Market Watch”	Gretchen Morgenson	
2003	Beat Writing	"Inside the S.E.C."	Stephen Labaton	
2005	Deadline Writing	"End of an Era"	Andrew Ross Sorkin, Steve Lohr, David Barboza, Gary Rivlin, John Markoff	
2005	Large Newspapers	"Death on the Tracks"	Walt Bogdanich	
2007	Feature Writing	"Rewriting the Social Contract"	Louis Uchitelle	
2008	Breaking News	"The Fall of E. Stanley O'Neal at Merrill Lynch"	Jenny Anderson, Landon Thomas Jr.	
2008	Commentary	"Talking Business"	Joe Nocera	
2008	Beat Writing (Honorable Mention)	"Golden Opportunities"	Charles Duhigg	
2008	Large Newspapers	"Toxic Pipeline"	Walt Bogdanich, Jake Hooker, David Barboza, Andrew W. Lehern	
2009	Beat Writing	"Wall Street"	Gretchen Morgenson	
2009	Large Newspapers	"The Reckoning"	Gretchen Morgenson, Peter S. Goodman, Charles Duhigg, Carter Dougherty, Eric Dash, Julie Creswell, Jo Becker, Sheryl Gay Stolberg, Stephen Labaton	
2009	Magazines	"Obamanomics"	David Leonhardt	
2010	Online Commentary and Blogging	"Pogue's Posts"	David Pogue	
2010	Large Newspapers	"Food Safety"	Michael Moss, Andrew Martin	
2011	Personal Finance	"Student Debt"	Ron Lieber	
2011	Commentary	Krugman's columns	Paul Krugman	
2013	Images/Visuals	"Economics Interactives"	Tom Giratikanon, Amanda Cox, Sergio Pecanha, Alicia Parlapiano, Jeremy White, Robert Gebeloff, Ford Fessenden, Archie Tse, Alan McLean, Shan Carter, Mike Bostock and Matthew Ericson	
2013	International	"China's Secret Fortunes"	David Barboza and Sharon LaFraniere	
2013	Investigative	"Wal-Mart Abroad"	David Barstow, Alejandra Xanic von Bertrab and Stephanie Clifford	
2014	Breaking News	"Bangladesh"	Jim Yardley, Julfikar Ali Manik, and Steven Greenhouse	
2014	Images/Visuals	"Interactive Graphics	Ford Fessenden, Tom Giratikanon, Josh Keller, Archie Tse, Tim Wallace, Derek Watkins, Jeremy White, Karen Yourish, Shan Carter, Hannah Fairfield, Alicia Parlapiano, Mike Bostock, Amanda Cox, Matthew Ericson, Kevin Quealy, and Josh Williams	
2015	Beat Reporting	"Lobbying in America"	Eric Lipton, Ben Protess, Nicholas Confessore and Brooke Williams	
2015	Images/Visuals	"Economic Tools & Visualizations"	Gregor Aisch, Wilson Andrews, Jeremy Ashkenas, Matthew Bloch, Mike Bostock, Shan Carter, Haeyoun Park, Alicia Parlapiano and Archie Tse	
2016	Images/Graphics/Interactives	"Making Data Visual"	Amanda Cox, Gregor Aisch, Kevin Quealy, Matthew Bloch, Wilson Andrews, Josh Keller, Karen Yourish, Eric Buth, Nicholas Confessore and Sarah Cohen	
2016	Commentary	"Inside the Boardroom"	James B. Stewart	

== Online Journalism Awards ==
Year	Description
	Denotes being a finalist, who did not win

Year	Category	Article	Author(s)	Citation
2001	Feature Journalism, Affiliated	"Salsa-Made in New York"	Peter Capatano	
2001	General Excellence in Online Journalism, Affiliated	N/A	The New York Times Staff	
2002	Breaking News, Affiliated	September 11 Coverage	The New York Times Staff	
2002	Creative Use of the Medium, Affiliated	Photographers Journal	N/A	
2002	General Excellence in Online Journalism – Affiliated, Large	N/A	The New York Times Staff	
2003	General Excellence in Online Journalism – Affiliated, Large	N/A	The New York Times Staff	
2003	Breaking News, Affiliated	Coverage of the Shuttle Columbia	The New York Times Staff	
2003	Breaking News, Affiliated	Coverage of the War in Iraq	The New York Times Staff	
2003	Enterprise Journalism, Affiliated	Dangerous Business	David Barstow and Lowell Bergman	
2004	Breaking News, Large	The Capture of Saddam Hussein	The New York Times Staff	
2004	Online Commentary, Large	His Columns	Nicholas D. Kristof	
2004	Specialty Journalism, Large	Movie Coverage	The New York Times Staff	
2005	Breaking News, Large Site	Asia's Deadly Waves	The New York Times Staff	
2005	General Excellence in Online Journalism, Large Site	N/A	The New York Times Staff	
2005	Outstanding Use of Multiple Media, Large Site	Class Matters	The New York Times Staff	
2006	Breaking News, Large Site	New York City Transit Strike	The New York Times Staff	
2006	General Excellence in Online Journalism, Large Site	N/A	The New York Times Staff	
2006	Online Commentary, Large Site	His Columns	David Pogue	
2007	Breaking News, Large Site	The Rampage at Virginia Tech	The New York Times Staff	
2007	General Excellence in Online Journalism, Large Site	N/A	The New York Times Staff	
2007	Outstanding Use of Digital Media, Large Site	Frugal Traveler: American Road Trip	Lucas Peterson	
2008	Outstanding Use of Digital Technology, Large Site	Politics	The New York Times Staff	
2008	General Excellence in Online Journalism, Large Site	N/A	The New York Times Staff	
2008	Breaking News, Large Site	Eliot Spitzer's Resignation	The New York Times Staff	
2008	Online Commentary, Large Sites	On the Ground	Nicholas Kristof	
2009	Online Topical Reporting/Blogging, Large Site	The Lede – Iran	Robert Mackey	
2009	General Excellence in Online Journalism, Large Site	Nytimes.com	The New York Times Staff	
2009	Outstanding Use of Digital Technologies, Large Site	Interactive Graphics	The New York Times Staff	
2009	Online Topical Reporting/Blogging, Large Site	The Well Blog	The New York Times Staff	
2010	Gannett Foundation Award for Innovative Investigative Journalism, Large Site	Toxic Waters	Charles Duhigg	
2010	General Excellence in Online Journalism, Large Site	N/A	The New York Times Staff	
2010	Breaking News, Large Site	Coverage of the 2010 Haiti earthquake	The New York Times Staff	
2010	Multimedia Feature Presentation, Large Site	Held by the Taliban	David Rohde	
2010	Outstanding Use of Digital Technologies, Professional	Oil Spill Tracker	Erin Aigner, Joe Burgess, Shan Carter, Joanne Nurse, Haeyoun Park, Amy Schoenfield and Archie Tse	
2011	Breaking News, Large Site	The Earthquake, Tsunami and Nuclear Crisis in Japan	The New York Times Staff	
2011	General Excellence in Online Journalism, Large Site	N/A	The New York Times Staff	
2011	Multimedia Feature Presentation, Large Site	A Year at War	James Dao, Catrin Einhorn, Damon Winter, Marcus Yam, Rob Harris, Gabriel Dance, Nancy Donaldson, Catrin Einhorn, Jon Huang, Andrew Kuenman, Meaghan Looram	
2011	Online Video Journalism, Large Site	Video Portraiture	The New York Times Staff	
2012	Planned News/Events, Large	The Reckoning – America and the World a Decade After 9/11	The New York Times Staff	
2012	Knight Award for Public Service	Abused and Used	Danny Hakim and Russ Buettner	
2012	Breaking News, Large	Coverage of Hurricane Irene	The New York Times Staff	
2012	Topical Reporting, Large	FiveThirtyEight — Nate Silver's Political Calculus	Nate Silver	
2013	General Excellence in Online Journalism, Large	N/A	The New York Times Staff	
2013	Gannett Foundation Award for Technical Innovation in the Service of Digital Journalism	D3.js	Mike Bostock	
2013	Knight Award for Public Service	Justice Denied: Bronx Courts	William Glaberson	
2013	Breaking News, Large	Coverage of Hurricane Sandy	The New York Times Staff	
2013	Planned News/Events, Large	Coverage of the 2012 Presidential Election	The New York Times Staff	
2013	Topical Reporting, Large	Reporting on the Supreme Court	The New York Times Staff	
2013	Online Commentary, Large	Op-Docs	The New York Times Staff	
2013	Feature, Large	Snow Fall	John Branch	
2014	General Excellence in Online Journalism, Large	NYTimes.com	The New York Times Staff	
2014	Planned News/Events, Large	NYC 2013: The Race for Mayor	The New York Times Staff	
2014	Planned News/Events, Large	Coverage of the Sochi Olympics	The New York Times Staff	
2014	Topical Reporting, Large	"The NSA’s Secret Campaign to Crack, Undermine Internet Security"	Jeff Larson (ProPublica), Nicole Perlroth (The New York Times), and Scott Shane (The New York Times)	
2014	Topical Reporting, Large	Paying Till it Hurts	Elisabeth Rosenthal	
2014	Online Commentary, Large	The Upshot	The New York Times Staff	
2014	Feature, Large	A Short History of the Highrise	Katerina Cizek	
2014	Excellence and Innovation in Visual Digital Storytelling, Large	Reshaping New York	Ford Fessenden, Tom Giratikanon, Josh Keller, Archie Tse, Tim Wallace, Derek Watkins, Jeremy White and Karen Yourish	
2015	The Al Neuharth Innovation in Investigative Journalism Award, Large	"The Secret Casualties of Iraq’s Abandoned Chemical Weapons"	C.J. Chivers	
2015	Gannett Foundation Award for Technical Innovation in the Service of Digital Journalism	AI2HTML	Archie Tse	
2015	Online Commentary, Large	Transgender Today Community Page	The New York Times Staff	
2015	Sports, Large	World Cup Coverage	Victor Mather	
2015	Sports, Large	Dawn Wall	John Branch	
2015	General Excellence in Online Journalism, Large	NYTimes.com	The New York Times Staff	
2015	Breaking News, Large	Germanwings ("Germanwings Crash in French Alps Kills 150; Cockpit Voice Recorder Is Found")	Nicola Clark and Dan Bilefsky	
2015	Planned News/Events, Large	Midterm Elections		
2015	Explanatory Reporting, Large	Ebola ("How Ebola Roared Back")	Kevin Sack, Sheri Fink, Pam Belluck, and Adam Nossiter	
2015	Feature, Large	"The Secret Life of Passwords"	Ian Urbina	
2016	General Excellence in Online Journalism, Large (tie)	NYTimes.com	The New York Times Staff	
2016	Breaking News, Large	Coverage of the Paris Attacks		
2016	Planned News / Events, Large	The Election		
2016	The University of Florida Award for Investigative Data Journalism, Large	"The Families Funding the 2016 Presidential Election"		
2016	Gannett Foundation Award for Technical Innovation in the Service of Digital Journalism	ArchieML		
2016	Explanatory Reporting, Large	The Upshot, Inequality,		
2016	Online Commentary	A Conversation on Race		
2016	Sports, Large	Sports Visualisation		

== Worth Bingham Prize ==
Year	Article	Author(s)	Citations
1994	"US Air" (tie)	Ralph Blumenthal, Douglas Frantz	
1997	"Taxes and Tactics"	Douglas Frantz	
2004	“Captive Clientele”	Diana Henriques	
2012	“Unlocked: Inside New Jersey’s Halfway Houses”	Sam Dolnick	

== Meyer Berger Awards ==
Year	Article	Author(s)	Notes
1975	Multiple articles that reflected "Mike Berger's keen eye and ear for happenings in his favorite town."	Deirdre Carmody	Two winners, the other one was Peter Coutros of the New York Daily News
1983	For her ''About New York'' columns	Anna Quindlen	Two winners, the other one was Paul LaRosa of the New York Daily News
1985	For her ''Pulling Together,'' stories	Sheila Rule	Two winners, the other one was Neal Hirschfeld of The Daily News
1988	For her ''stories of life in and around New York that show the same feeling for the people of the metropolis that characterized Mike Berger's work,''	Sara Rimer	Two winners, the other one was Jim Dwyer of Newsday
1995	For her series "Another America: Life on 129th Street,"	Felicia R. Lee	
2011	“A Parish Tested”	Anne Barnard	
2012	“Punched Out: The Life and Death of a Hockey Enforcer”	John Branch	

== Maria Moors Cabot Prize ==
Year	Category	Author	Notes
1988	Medalist	Stephen Kinzer	
2015	Medalist	Simon Romero	
2015	Special Citation	Ernesto Londoño	

== George Polk Awards ==
Year	Category	Author	Citation
1948	Education Reporting	Benjamin Fine	
1949	Science Reporting	William Laurence	
1950	National Reporting	Ira H. Freeman	
1951	Foreign Reporting	Milton Bracker and Virginia Lee Warren	
1951	Education Reporting	Kalman Siegel	
1952	National Reporting	A.H. Raskin	
1952	Special Award	Jack Gould	
1953	National Reporting	James Reston	
1954	International Reporting	Thomas J. Hamilton	
1954	National Reporting	Luther Huston	
1955	International Reporting	Thomas J. Hamilton	
1955	Education Reporting	Gertrude Samuels	
1956	Special Award	Emanuel R. Freedman	
1957	Foreign Reporting	Harrison E. Salisbury	
1958	Special Award	Walter Sullivan	
1959	Foreign Reporting	A.M. Rosenthal	
1959	National Reporting	Nathaniel Gerstenzang	
1962	Foreign Reporting	Dana Adams Schmidt	
1963	Foreign Reporting	David Halberstam	
1963	Special Award	A.H. Raskins	
1964	Metropolitan Reporting	A.M. Rosenthal	
1965	Editorial Comment	John B. Oakes	
1966	Foreign Reporting	Harrison E. Salisbury	
1967	Foreign Reporting	R.W. Apple Jr.	
1967	Local Reporting	J. Anthony Lukes	
1968	Community Service	David Burnam	
1968	Political Reporting	Martin Arnold	
1969	Foreign Reporting	Henry Kamm	
1969	National Reporting	Walter Rugaber	
1970	Foreign Reporting	Gloria Emerson	
1971	Foreign Reporting	Sydney H. Schanberg	
1971	National Reporting	The New York Times	
1971	Education Reporting	Joseph Lelyveld	
1972	Special Award	Lesley Oelsner	
1973	National Reporting	Andrew H. Malcolm	
1973	Investigative Reporting	Seymour Hersh	
1974	National Reporting	Seymour M. Hersh	
1974	Metropolitan Reporting	Richard Severo	
1974	Special Award	Sydney H. Schanberg	
1977	Commentary	Red Smith	
1978	Foreign Reporting	John F. Burns, John Darnton, Michael T. Kaufman	
1978	Commentary	Russell Baker	
1979	Career Award	Alden Whitman	
1979	Foreign Reporting	John Kifne	
1980	Editorials	Editorial Board	
1981	Foreign Reporting	John Darnton	
1981	National Reporting	Seymour M. Hersh, Jeff Gerth, Phillip Taubman	
1982	Foreign Reporting	Thomas L. Friedman, David K. Shipler	
1982	National Reporting	Richard Halloran	
1983	Foreign Reporting	Joseph Lelyveld	
1983	Foreign Affairs Reporting	Philip Taubman	
1984	Magazine Reporting	John Vinocur	
1985	Career Award	George Tames	
1985	Medical Reporting	Lawerence K. Altman	
1985	Foreign Reporting	Alan Cowell	
1986	Career Award	James Reston	
1988	Foreign Reporting	John Kifner	
1988	National Reporting	Keith Schneider	
1989	Career Award	Fred Hechinger	
1989	International Reporting	Stephen Engelberg, Michael R. Gordon	
1989	Foreign Reporting	Nicholas Kristof, Sheryl WuDunn	
1990	National Reporting	Susan F. Rasky and David E. Rosenbaum	
1991	Foreign Reporting	Francis X. Clines	
1991	Foreign Reporting	Barbara Crossette	
1992	Career Award	Herbert Mitgang	
1993	Regional Reporting	Isabel Wilkerson	
1994	National Reporting	Joel Brinkley, Deborah Sontag, and Stephen Engelberg	
1995	Metropolitan Reporting	Frank Bruni, Nina Bernstein, Joyce Purnick and Lizette Alverez	
1995	Business Reporting	Kurt Eichenwald	
1996	Economics Reporting	The New York Times	
1996	Foreign Reporting	John F. Burns	
1997	Business Reporting	Kurt Eichenwald and Martin Gottlieb	
1997	National Reporting	Keith Bradsher	
1998	Career Award	Russell Baker	
1998	Local Reporting	Clifford J. Levy	
1999	National Reporting	Jason DeParle	
2000	Special Award	The New York Times Staff for "How Race Is Lived in America"	
2000	Career Award	John B. Oakes	

== Mirror Awards ==
Year	Section	Article(s)	Writer, Reporter, Editor or Organization	Citation
2007	Best Commentary	"The Media Equation"	David Carr	
2008	Best Commentary	N/A	Joe Nocera	
2008	Overall Excellence	Monday Media section	The New York Times Staff	
2009	Best Commentary, Traditional Media	N/A	David Carr	
2009	Best In-depth Piece, Traditional Media	”Behind TV Analysts, Pentagon’s Hidden Hand“ ”One Man’s Military-Industrial-Media Complex“	David Barstow	
2012	Best Commentary, Traditional/Legacy Media	“The Disposable Woman”	Anna Holmes	
2012	Best Commentary, Digital Media	The Soap Opera Is Dead! Long Live The Soap Opera!” "Seeing ‘Bridesmaids’ is a social responsibility” “30 Rock’ takes on feminist hypocrisy–and its own”	Rebecca Traister	

== Alfred I. duPont Awards ==
Year	Article	Winners	Citation
2006	"The Secret History of the Credit Card"	Frontline, WGBH, Boston, and The New York Times	
2007	"Nuclear Jihad: Can Terrorists Get the Bomb?"	Discovery Times Channel, Canadian Broadcasting Corporation and The New York Times	
2012	"A Year at War" "Surviving Haiti's Earthquake: Children"	The New York Times	

== Sigma Delta Chi Award ==
Year	Category	Article	Author	Citation
1996	Newspaper/Wire Service Washington Correspondence	"Gulf War Syndrome"	Philip Shenon	
2005	Foreign Correspondence	“Rule by Law”	Joseph Kahn and Jim Yardley	
2006	Non-Deadline Reporting (Circulation Of 100,000 Or Greater)	“Broken Ground: The Hole in the City’s Heart”	Deborah Sontag	
2007	Washington Correspondence	“Interrogation Secrets”	David Johnston, Mark Mazzetti, James Risen & Scott Shane	
2008	Deadline Reporting (circulation of 100,000 or greater)	“The Spitzer Scandal”	The New York Times Staff	
2008	Washington Correspondence	“Message Machine”	David Barstow	
2008	Foreign Correspondence	“Kremlin Rules”	Clifford J. Levy	
2009	Investigative Reporting (Daily Circulation 100,001+)	“Toxic Waters”	Charles Duhigg	
2009	General Column Writing (Daily Circulation 100,000+)	His Columns	Nicholas D. Kristof	
2009	Magazine Writing (National Circulation)	“The Deadly Choices at Memorial”	Sheri Fink, ProPublica with The New York Times Magazine	
2010	Washington Correspondence (Daily Publication)	"Capitol Hill"	Eric Lipton	
2010	General Column Writing (Daily Circulation 100,000+)	"This Land"	Dan Barry	
2011	Digital Media Presentation (Affiliated)	"The Reckoning"	The New York Times Staff	
2011	Specialized Journalism Site	"SchoolBook"	The New York Times and WNYC	
2012	General Column Writing (Daily Circulation 100,001+)	His Columns	Jim Dwyer	
2013	Feature Reporting (Daily Circulation 100,001+)	“Invisible Child”	Andrea Elliott	
2014	Foreign Correspondence	“Underwriting Jihad”	Rukmini Callimachi	
2015	Foreign Correspondence	“The outlaw ocean”	Ian Urbina	

== The Hillman Prize ==
Year	Category	Article	Author(s)	Notes
1951	Newspaper	Articles on labor	A. H. Raskin	
1957	Newspaper	Editorials on the Middle East Crisis (special award)	The New York Times	
1967	Newspaper	Reporting from North Vietnam (special award)	Harrison E. Salisbury	
1971	Newspaper	Series on the Kent State tragedy	John Kifner	
1972	Newspaper	"The Pentagon Papers"	Neil Sheehan	
1975	Newspaper	Articles on the C.I.A.	Seymour M. Hersh	
1998	Newspaper	"Learning Poverty Firsthand" & other stories of welfare reform	Jason DeParle	
2004	Newspaper	"Dangerous Business"	David Barstow and Lowell Bergman NYT, Neil Docherty and David Rummel Frontline/CBC/NYT	
2008	Newspaper	"Golden Opportunities"	Charles Duhigg	
2009	Newspaper	"Deaths in Immigrant Detention"	Nina Bernstien	
2016	Newspaper	“Cellblock Justice”	Michael Winerip, Michael Schwirtz, Tom Robbins	Other honoree was The Marshall Project

== Livingston Awards ==
Year	Article	Author	Position	Citation
1983	"The Beirut Massacre: The Four Days"	Thomas Friedman	Beirut Bureau Chief	
1993	"Abuse Turns Fatal: How the System Failed" (series)	Celia W. Dugger	Reporter(s)	
2001	"Desperate Passage"	Michael Finkel	Reporter(s)	
2006	"The Struggle for Iraq"	Edward Wong	Reporter(s)	
2008	"C.I.A. Destroyed Two Tapes Showing Interrogation"	Mark Mazzetti	Reporter(s)	
2014	"The Dream Boat"	Luke Mogelson	Reporter(s)	
2016	"The Agency"	Adrian Chen	Reporter(s)	
2018	"O’Reilly Thrives, Then Falls, as Settlements Add Up"	Emily Steel and Michael S. Schmidt	Reporter(s)	

== Elmer Ferguson Memorial Award ==
Year	Journalist	Citation
1984	Joe Nichols	

== Science in Society Journalism Awards ==
Year	Article	Author(s)	Notes
2004	“The Quest to Forget”	Robin Marantz Henig	
2005	"Arctic Rush	Craig Duff and Andrew C. Revkin	A collaboration of The New York Times, the Discovery Times Channel and the Canadian Broadcasting Corporation.
2010	"Toxic Waters”	Charles Duhigg	tie with Martha Mendoza and Margie Mason for their Associated Press series “When Drugs Stop Working”
2011	“My Father’s Broken Heart”	Katy Butler	
2014	“A Race to Save the Orange by Altering Its DNA"	Amy Harmon	

== The Sidney Award ==
Date	Article	Author(s)	Citation
February 2010	"Tea Party Lights Fuse for Rebellion on Right"	David Barstow	
May 2010	"Depression, Abuse, Suicide: Fishermen's Wives Face Post-Spill Trauma"	Mac McClelland	
March 2011	"G.E.’s Strategies Let It Avoid Taxes Altogether"	David Kocieniewski	
June 2011	"My Life as an Undocumented Immigrant"	Jose Antonio Vargas	
January 2012	"Derek Boogaard: A Boy Learns to Brawl"	John Branch	
May 2013	"Last Hope in Ruins: Bangladesh’s Race to Save Shaheena" "The Most Hated Bangladeshi, Toppled From a Shady Empire" "Major Retailers Join Bangladesh Safety Plan" "Abercrombie & Fitch Signs Bangladesh Safety Plan"	Julfikar Ali Manik Steven Greenhouse Jim Yardley	
August 2013	"A Shuffle of Aluminum, but to Banks, Pure Gold"	David Kocieniewski	
June 2015	“The Price of Nice Nails” "Perfect Nails, Poisoned Workers"	Malsin Nir	
November 2015	"Beware the Fine Print"	Jessica Silver-Greenberg and Robert Gebeloff	
July 2016	"When You Dial 911 and Wall Street Answers"	Danielle Ivory, Ben Protess and Kitty Bennett	
August 2016	"How a $2 Roadside Drug Test Sends Innocent People to Jail"	Ryan Gabrielson and Topher Sanders	

== Missouri Lifestyle Journalism Awards ==
- 1982 General Excellence
- 1977 Jane Brody Consumer Writing
- 1977 Richard Severo General Reporting
