= Wulfson =

Wulfson is a surname. Notable people with the surname include:

- Harris Wulfson (1974–2008), American composer, instrumentalist, and software engineer
- Jay Wulfson, American railroad owner

== See also ==
- Wolfson
