= Laurie Puhn =

American writer, television personality and lawyer

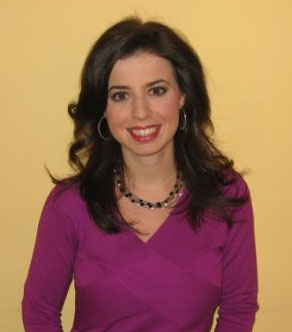
Laurie Puhn

Laurie Puhn is an American writer, television personality and family/divorce lawyer. She hosted i on New York, on WPXN-TV from 2006-2007.

A graduate of Harvard College and Harvard Law School, she initially practiced corporate law at a New York City law firm. Puhn was featured as the Communications Expert on an ABC 20/20 special about "Rudeness in America. " She is a frequent commentator on Fox News Channel, Fox 5's Good Day NY, WNBC's Weekend Today in NY and was featured on CNN's Tips from the Top. Laurie was the cover story for Networking magazine's June 2006 issue. Her commentary has been featured in magazines including Entrepreneur, Maxim, Good Housekeeping, Redbook, Woman's Day and Glamour, as well as featured in newspapers such as Chicago Tribune, Newsday and The New York Times.

She is the author of Instant Persuasion: How to Change Your Words to Change Your Life (Penguin, 2005), and President of Laurie Puhn Communications. Her second book Fight Less, Love More: 5-Minute Conversations to Change Your Relationship without Blowing Up or Giving In (Rodale, 2010), was released on October 12, 2010.

Laurie grew up in Great Neck, New York. She attended the Great Neck School District, and graduated from Great Neck North High School.

== Awards ==
- Dr. Martin Luther King Jr. Recognition Award
- Town of North Hempstead Women's Roll of Honor
- Instant Persuasion, authored by Laurie Puhn, nominated for Best Motivational Book of 2005

== Work ==
ViaCord, a part of PerkinElmer, partnered with Laurie to publish her advice blog for moms and dads-to-be. The blog address is www. expectingwords.com.

Recently Laurie wrote an article for CNN.com featuring ways to avoid an argument. The link for this article is listed below.

== Sources ==
- Article about "i on New York"
- Networking Magazine cover story
- 10 Things to Say to Keep the Peace
