= John L. Miller Great Neck North High School =

Great Neck North High School
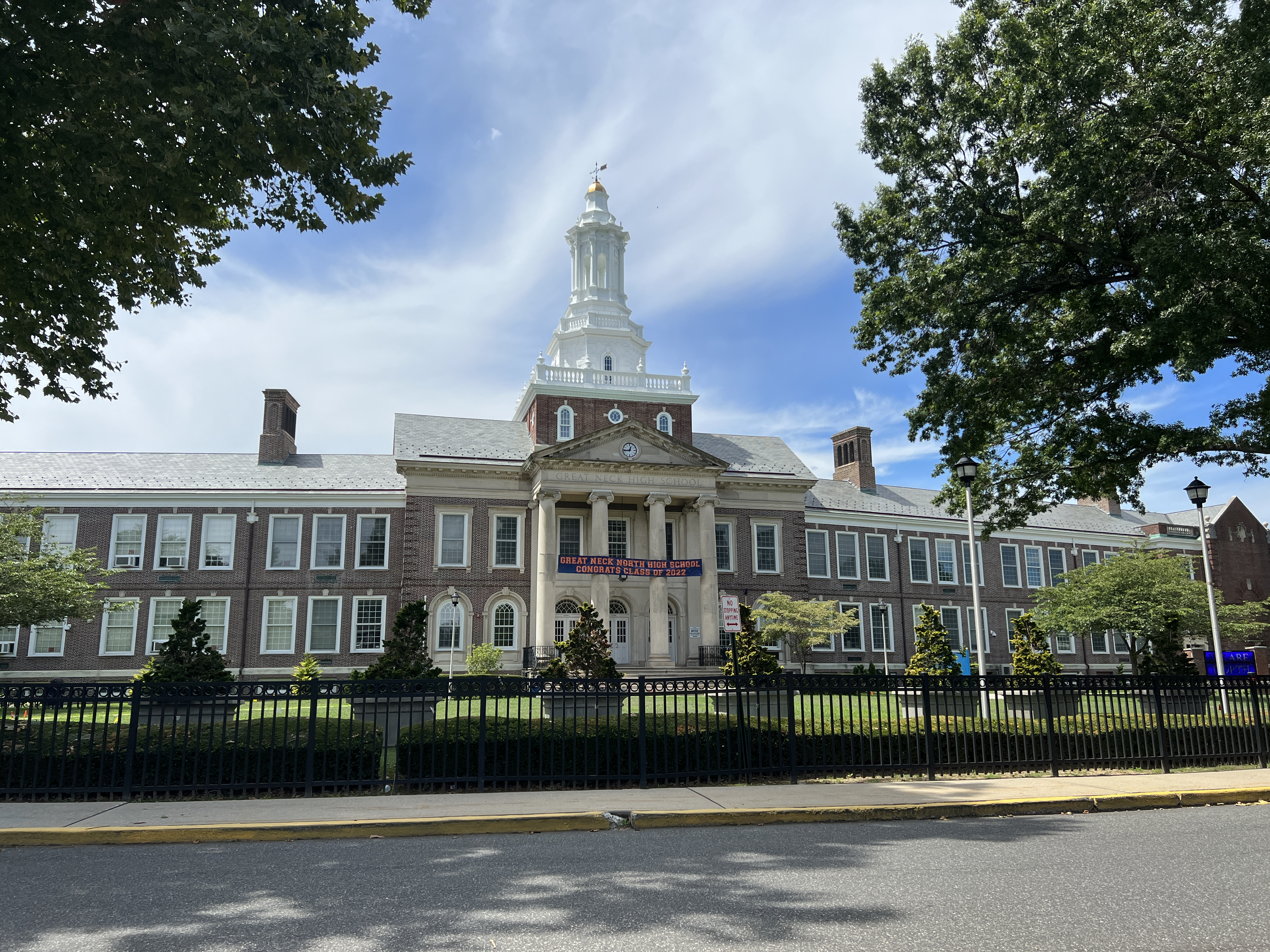
- John L. Miller Great Neck High School

Location
- 35 Polo Rd; Great Neck, New York 11023; United States; 40°48′0″N 73°44′26″W

Information
- Type: Public
- Established: 1929
- School district: Great Neck Public Schools
- NCES School ID: 361251001016
- Principal: Corey McNamara
- Teaching staff: 130.45 (on an FTE basis)
- Grades: 9-12
- Enrollment: 1,163 (2023-2024)
- Student to teacher ratio: 8.92
- Campus: Suburban: Large
- Colors: Blue, White and Orange
- Mascot: Blazer the Wonder Goat
- Team name: Blazers
- Newspaper: Guide Post
- Yearbook: Arista
- Website: nhs.greatneck.k12.ny.us

John L. Miller Great Neck North High School or simply "Great Neck North," is a public high school, including grades 9 through 12, in the village of Great Neck, New York, operated by the Great Neck School District.

As of the 2018–19 school year, the school had an enrollment of 1,172 students and 105.6 classroom teachers (on an FTE basis), for a student–teacher ratio of 11.1:1. There were 198 students (16.9% of enrollment) eligible for free lunch and 20 (1.7% of students) eligible for reduced-cost lunch.

The school building was designed by the noted architectural firm of Guilbert and Betelle.

According to Newsweek magazine's 2015 list of "America's Best High Schools," Great Neck North High School was ranked 105th. The school is on Polo Road, about a mile and a half from the LIRR Railroad station.

== History ==
Great Neck High School was established in 1895, in a wood-frame building on Arrandale Avenue at Middle Neck Road that also housed elementary school students. The wood building was expanded in 1900 but then destroyed by fire and replaced by a brick building in 1921. By this time high school students had moved into their own building, just to the west of the original Arrandale building. The site of the east Arrandale building is now a park and an apartment building for senior citizens.

The first building named Great Neck High School opened in 1914. Its location was between the original Arrandale school and the original Great Neck Library (now Great Neck House]). This school building, also built of brick, was demolished in 1976. The site of the west Arrandale building is now a parking lot for Great Neck House.

The main section of the present building on Polo Road opened in 1929. The school was still known as Great Neck High School, as engraved above the building's main entrance. As the student population grew, the school became known as Great Neck Junior-Senior High School and served grades 7–12. By 1936, there were 1228 pupils, only grades 8–12 of which could fit in the Polo Road building. Grade 7 was housed in the west Arrandale building. After World War II ended, the school district's student population grew quickly. The Polo Road building was expanded in 1947, in general accordance with its architect's original plan.

As the population explosion continued, the district built new buildings. In January 1952, Great Neck Junior High School was opened to serve grades 7–9, and the existing school was renamed Great Neck Senior High School, serving only grades 10–12. In 1958, a South campus including another high school and junior high school was opened. As a result, the existing high school was renamed Great Neck North Senior High School. In 1970, the school was renamed to honor Dr. John L. Miller upon his retirement after 28 years as superintendent of the school district. The new name was John L. Miller–Great Neck North Senior High School, though the full name was rarely used except for official documents.

The student population shrank after the Baby Boom generation graduated in the 1970s, and grade 9 was moved back to the high school building. The current name of the school was then adopted: John L. Miller–Great Neck North High School.

As of 1988, Great Neck North has an "open campus" policy. Students in grades 9 through 12 may go in and out of campus on foot during free periods to purchase lunch. Rona Telsey, a spokesperson for the district, said in 1988 that "open campus" had not been a controversy for the school.

Since 1971, Great Neck North has been home to the Community School alternative program, a humanities-centered school-within-a-school that focuses on seminar-style learning. Students may apply to the Community School at the end of their ninth-grade year.

In 2010, the school made national news when former student Sam Eshaghoff was arrested for fraud after seven North High students had paid him to take the SAT for them.

== Notable alumni ==
- Jon Avnet, movie director/producer
- David Baltimore, Nobel Prize winner
- Nikki Blonsky, actress and singer
- Amy Bloom, writer and psychotherapist
- David Aaron Carpenter, violist
- Mary L. Cleave, astronaut, associate administrator of NASA's science missions
- Steve Cohen, hedge fund manager, owner of the New York Mets of Major League Baseball
- Kenneth Cole, clothing designer
- Francis Ford Coppola, movie director, class of 1955
- R.J. Cutler, filmmaker, documentarian, television producer and theater director, class of 1979
- Peter Diamandis, engineer, physician and entrepreneur, founder and chairman of the X Prize Foundation and co-founder and chairman of Singularity University
- Trevor Engelson, film director and former husband of Meghan, Duchess of Sussex
- Richard Epstein (born 1943), James Parker Hall Distinguished Service Professor of Law at the University of Chicago
- Sam Eshaghoff, real estate developer and exam cheater
- Jared Evan, singer, songwriter, rapper
- Peter Fishbach, tennis player
- Jim Gurfein, tennis player
- Ilan Hall, winner of the second season of the Bravo television network's reality series Top Chef
- Phil Hankinson, former NBA player and champion for the Boston Celtics
- Emily Hughes, figure skater, member of the U.S. Figure Skating Team at the 2006 Winter Olympics
- Sarah Hughes, gold medalist in women's figure skating at the 2002 Winter Olympics
- Adam Kantor, actor and singer
- Michael Karlan, founded Professionals in the City networking group
- Andy Kaufman, comedian/actor, played Latka Gravas in Taxi
- Marc J. Leder, former senior vice president of Lehman Brothers, co-founder of Sun Capital Partners
- Richard M. Levine, journalist and author
- Fiona Ma, Treasurer of California, 2019-2027
- Minae Mizumura, novelist, essayist, critic
- Laurie Puhn, TV host, author
- Dan Raviv, CBS News correspondent and host of the Weekend Roundup on the CBS Radio Network
- Peter Rennert, tennis player
- Jimmy Roberts, composer
- Roxanne Seeman, songwriter and Broadway producer
- Jacob Seidenberg, Cornell Capital
- David Seidler, Academy Award winner for best screenplay for The King's Speech
- Ziggy Steinberg (born 1945) screenwriter, essayist, producer
- Andrew Watt, songwriter and musician
- Michael H. Weber, screenwriter and producer
- Michael Zimmerman, tennis player
