= David Levien & Brian Koppelman =

David Levien and Brian Koppelman
- Born: David Levien; Great Neck, New York, U.S.
- Education: University of Michigan (BA)
- Occupations: Screenwriter, director, producer
- Years active: 1997–present
- Born: Brian William Koppelman; Roslyn Harbor, New York, U.S.
- Education: Tufts University (BA), Fordham University (JD)
- Occupations: Screenwriter, director, producer
- Years active: 1997–present

David Levien & Brian Koppelman are an American screenwriting, directing, and producing duo. They have worked together on several film and television projects since the late 1990s. Their work includes co-writing Rounders (1998) and Knockaround Guys (2001), as well as co-creating the television series Billions, which aired on Showtime from 2016 to 2023.

Other credits include Runaway Jury (2003), Ocean’s Thirteen (2007), and Solitary Man (2009). In addition to writing and directing, they have served as creators and showrunners for Billions and the anthology series Super Pumped.

== Early life ==
Brian Koppelman and David Levien met as teenagers and developed a friendship based on mutual interests in film, literature, and music. They later attended different colleges and started separate careers but maintained communication and continued to exchange ideas. In the mid-1990s, their discussions led to a formal collaboration as co-writers of screenplays.

== Career ==
=== Collaboration in film ===
Koppelman & Levien began their screenwriting collaboration in the late 1990s with the poker drama Rounders (1998). Inspired by Koppelman's experiences in New York’s underground poker clubs, and the research in those clubs they then did together, they co-wrote the original screenplay. Rounders, starring Matt Damon and Edward Norton, was acquired by Miramax and marked their first major Hollywood project. Although the film achieved modest initial success, it developed a cult following and is frequently associated with the poker boom of the early 2000s. Professional poker player and World Series of Poker champion Chris Moneymaker credited the film with influencing his interest in poker.

Following Rounders, Levien and Koppelman continued collaborating on various film projects. They co-wrote and co-directed the crime thriller Knockaround Guys (2001), featuring Vin Diesel and John Malkovich. They then contributed the screenplay for the John Grisham adaptation Runaway Jury (2003), earning an Edgar Award nomination for Best Motion Picture Screenplay. In 2004, they wrote the screenplay for the action remake Walking Tall, starring Dwayne Johnson.

In 2006, Levien and Koppelman served as producers on Neil Burger’s film The Illusionist, starring Edward Norton. They subsequently co-wrote Ocean’s Thirteen (2007), directed by Steven Soderbergh, and reunited with Soderbergh for The Girlfriend Experience (2009), a drama set in the world of high-end escorts. That same year, Koppelman wrote and they co-directed Solitary Man, featuring Michael Douglas in a lead role praised by critics.

Other projects include producing the war drama The Lucky Ones (2008), co-writing and producing the online gambling thriller Runner Runner (2013) starring Justin Timberlake and Ben Affleck, and producing independent films such as Interview with the Assassin (2002) and I Smile Back (2015).

=== Television work ===
Koppelman & Levien expanded into television in 2005 with the ESPN dramatic series Tilt, centered on Las Vegas poker culture. The series aired for one season, with Levien and Koppelman serving as executive producers and occasionally directing episodes. They next directed one of the ESPN 30 for 30 films, This Is What They Want, about Jimmy Connors.

Their most prominent television project is the Showtime series Billions (2016–2023), co-created with financial columnist Andrew Ross Sorkin. Starring Paul Giamatti and Damian Lewis, the series explored the competitive worlds of finance and law. Koppelman and Levien acted as showrunners and executive producers throughout the series. The series was noted for featuring one of American television’s first non-binary main characters, Taylor Mason, portrayed by Asia Kate Dillon.

In 2022, they co-created Super Pumped: The Battle for Uber, an anthology series based on Mike Isaac’s book about Uber’s CEO Travis Kalanick. Koppelman and Levien, along with Beth Schacter, served as showrunners for the first season, featuring Joseph Gordon-Levitt. The series continued their thematic exploration of ambition and corporate culture.

== Filmography ==
=== Film ===
- Rounders (1998): co-writers of the poker–drama feature
- Knockaround Guys (2001): co-wrote, co-directed and produced the crime thriller
- Interview with the Assassin (2002): producers on the faux-documentary thriller
- Runaway Jury (2003): co-adapted John Grisham’s courtroom novel for the screen
- Walking Tall (2004): shared screenplay credit on the Dwayne Johnson remake
- The Illusionist (2006): producers on Neil Burger’s period mystery
- Ocean’s Thirteen (2007): sole screenwriters of the franchise’s third installment
- The Lucky Ones (2008): produced the Iraq War road movie
- The Girlfriend Experience (2009): co-wrote Steven Soderbergh’s indie drama
- Solitary Man (2009): wrote and co-directed the Michael Douglas character study
- Runner Runner (2013): wrote and executive-produced the online-gambling thriller
- I Smile Back (2015): producers of the Sarah Silverman addiction drama

=== Television ===
- The Street Lawyer (CBS pilot, 2003): writers and executive producers on the John Grisham adaptation
- Tilt (ESPN, 2005): creators, writers and executive producers of the high-stakes poker series
- This Is What They Want (ESPN 30 for 30, 2013): co-directed the Jimmy Connors documentary
- Billions (Showtime, 2016–2023): co-creators and showrunners of the Wall-Street drama
- Super Pumped (Showtime anthology, 2022– ): co-created the tech-industry limited series

== Awards and recognition ==
Koppelman and Levien have received multiple honors and nominations throughout their careers. Their screenplay for Runaway Jury earned a nomination for the Edgar Allan Poe Award for Best Motion Picture Screenplay in 2003.

In 2014, Koppelman and Levien received a Sports Emmy Award for their ESPN documentary This Is What They Want.
