= Sam Eshaghoff =

American real estate developer (born 1992)

- Eshaghoff in 2023
- Born: Samuel Ezra Eshaghoff; July 30, 1992 (age 34); Great Neck, New York, U.S.
- Education: New York University Stern School of Business (MBA); Zicklin School of Business (BBA)
- Occupation: Real estate developer
- Title: Founder and managing principal, West Egg Development
- Website: westeggdevelopment.com

Sam Eshaghoff (born July 30, 1992) is an American real estate developer. He is the founder and managing principal of West Egg Development, a New York City firm that builds and renovates multifamily and mixed-use buildings in Brooklyn, Queens, Manhattan and the Hudson Valley. The firm's largest project, The Hana, a 38-unit mixed-use building in Bayside, Queens, was completed in 2026. Eshaghoff also publishes analyses of the New York City rental market that have been reported by local media.

As a college student in 2011, Eshaghoff was arrested for taking the SAT and ACT on behalf of paying high school students on Long Island. The case drew national attention and prompted the College Board and ACT to adopt stricter identification requirements for test-takers in 2012.

== Early life and education ==
Eshaghoff was born in Great Neck, New York. His grandfather, a homebuilder, emigrated from Iran in 1960. His mother, Janet Esagoff, is a real estate attorney in Great Neck.

He graduated from John L. Miller Great Neck North High School in 2010 and spent a year at the University of Michigan before transferring to Emory University. He withdrew from Emory after his 2011 arrest and graduated from Baruch College's Zicklin School of Business in 2014 with a Bachelor of Business Administration, majoring in finance and real estate. He later earned an MBA from the New York University Stern School of Business.

== Career ==
=== Early career ===
Eshaghoff has said the publicity from the SAT case made it difficult to find his first job after college. He was hired by Arthur Bocchi at a Manhattan private-equity firm that was launching a real estate division, where the two worked on a 400,000-square-foot cold-storage facility near Port Newark, New Jersey, and a 75,000-square-foot condominium project in Downtown Brooklyn. The pair later left the firm to buy and renovate one- to three-family houses in the New York area, after which a Great Neck family office hired Eshaghoff to handle acquisitions.

=== West Egg Development ===
Encouraged by his grandfather to work independently, Eshaghoff built his first solo project, two two-family houses at 710–714 Wortman Avenue in East New York, Brooklyn, which were completed in 2018. He financed the project with $125,000 of his savings and $480,000 from friends and family, and personally guaranteed a $500,000 bridge loan when construction funds ran out. The houses were listed at $1 million each, which local media reported as the first million-dollar homes in East New York. Their sale at a profit provided the capital to launch West Egg Development.

Between February 2019 and 2020, West Egg assembled four development sites on a single block of East 53rd Street in East Flatbush, Brooklyn, near Kings County Hospital Center, for a combined $2.65 million; the later purchases were made in partnership with Bobby Shamsian's Brookbridge Developers. The planned buildings, designed by Gerald Caliendo and Shahin Badaly, totaled 36 apartments: eight at 110 East 53rd Street, eight at 102 East 53rd Street, and twelve at 76 East 53rd Street, with a further building at 104–108 East 53rd Street. The New York Real Estate Journal named Eshaghoff to its "2020 Ones to Watch" list, citing the East Flatbush assemblage.

In July 2020 The New York Times reported Eshaghoff's purchase of a mixed-use building on Steinway Street in Astoria, Queens. In January 2021 the firm, with Torque Equities, filed plans for a four-story building of seven condominiums and a community facility at 106–108 Terrace View Avenue in Marble Hill, Manhattan; the firm later described the site as entitled and sold. The firm's website also lists renovation and ground-up projects in Bedford–Stuyvesant, Williamsburg, Crown Heights, Corona, Castle Hill, Rhinebeck and Manhattan.

By 2025 The Real Deal described West Egg as having completed more than a dozen projects, operating with a small staff, hiring teams on a project-by-project basis and raising capital from friends-and-family investors. In 2026 the New York Post described Eshaghoff as the owner of nearly a dozen New York City properties containing rent-stabilized units.

=== The Hana, Bayside ===
West Egg's largest project is a five-story mixed-use building at the corner of Northern Boulevard and 215th Place in Bayside, Queens, developed in a joint venture with the site's longtime owners under the 421-a program. Renderings by Caliendo Architects were released in 2022 under the address 215-16 Northern Boulevard, and updated in December 2023 under the address 215-20 Northern Boulevard, showing 38 apartments, about 5,000 square feet of ground-floor retail, a rooftop deck, a gym and underground parking, with Lions Group as general contractor. The project was financed with a $16 million construction loan from Ponce Bank, recorded in January 2024.

The building, marketed as The Hana with a residential entrance at 45-10 215th Place, opened a housing lottery in January 2026 for 12 apartments reserved for households earning up to 130 percent of area median income. The New York Real Estate Journal reported the 43,500-square-foot building as completed in May 2026, with its three retail spaces leased to national tenants.

=== Market research and commentary ===
Eshaghoff has written opinion pieces on New York housing policy for Crain's New York Business, Commercial Observer and the New York Real Estate Journal, arguing for renewed tax abatements for new construction and for extending the city's supermarket incentive program to healthy fast-casual restaurants. The Real Deal quoted him on the latter point in a 2024 analysis of the FRESH program.

In February 2026 Eshaghoff published an interactive map of average asking rents by neighborhood across the five boroughs, built from StreetEasy listings, with filters for apartment size, subway proximity and crime statistics; it was reported by PIX11. In April 2026 the New York Post reported West Egg's first-quarter analysis finding that three-bedroom rents had risen 7 percent citywide in a quarter and sharply more in some Manhattan and Brooklyn neighborhoods, which Eshaghoff attributed to household formation and a shortage of family-sized apartments. After the New York City Rent Guidelines Board approved a rent freeze on stabilized apartments in June 2026, he told the Post that the economics of owning rent-stabilized buildings were becoming unsustainable.

== Civic activities ==
In 2021 Eshaghoff joined the executive team of The Brooklyn Bank, a Bedford–Stuyvesant nonprofit that runs financial-literacy programs and tax clinics. The organization's federal tax filings for 2022 and 2023 list him as chair of its board. As a condition of the 2011 discharge of his case he tutored low-income students in SAT preparation; he has said he volunteered with the Educational Alliance's Manny Cantor Center on the Lower East Side.

== 2011 SAT impersonation case ==
=== Scheme and arrest ===
On September 27, 2011, Eshaghoff, then a 19-year-old Emory sophomore, was arrested and charged in Nassau County with scheming to defraud, criminal impersonation and falsifying business records. Prosecutors said that in 2010 and 2011 he had charged six Great Neck North students between $1,500 and $2,500 each to take the SAT in their place, using forged school identification cards bearing his photograph and the client's name, and sitting the exam at test centers where the students were not known. He scored between 2140 and 2220 out of 2400 on the tests he took for others, having scored 2100 on his own. The scheme was uncovered after school officials noticed discrepancies between students' grades and scores, and the Educational Testing Service compared handwriting on the exams. Six students who had paid him were charged with misdemeanors.

The Nassau County district attorney, Kathleen Rice, later said Eshaghoff had taken the SAT at least 16 times and the ACT as well, over about three years, flying home from college on weekends to sit exams and in some cases taking tests for female clients under unisex-sounding names. In November 2011 a further 13 people were charged, bringing the total to 20, including four other alleged impersonators and students from Great Neck South High School, North Shore Hebrew Academy and Roslyn High School. Eshaghoff was represented by attorney Matin Emouna.

=== Plea and aftermath ===
In late 2011 Eshaghoff and the district attorney's office agreed to a conditional discharge of the case; he served no jail time and was required to perform community service by tutoring low-income students in SAT test-taking strategies. He withdrew from Emory University, which had opened a student-conduct investigation. Hofstra University provost Herman Berliner, writing in Inside Higher Ed, criticized the sentence as too lenient. Bloomsburg University used the case as the basis of an ethics assignment for its 2012 incoming class.

=== Effect on test security ===
At an October 2011 hearing of the New York State Senate's Higher Education Committee convened in response to the case, the College Board announced it had retained the firm of former FBI director Louis Freeh to review test security. Senator Kenneth LaValle introduced a bill to make facilitating test fraud a felony; it did not pass.

In March 2012 the College Board and ACT announced that, beginning that fall, test-takers would be required to upload a photograph at registration that would be printed on their admission ticket and on the test center roster, and that standby and day-of registration changes would be eliminated. Rice, whose office had pressed for the changes, said the reforms closed a gap in test security.

== In media ==
Eshaghoff was interviewed by Alison Stewart for a 60 Minutes segment, "The Perfect Score: Cheating on the SAT", broadcast on January 1, 2012, which also featured Rice and Educational Testing Service president Kurt Landgraf. In the interview he described the scheme and said he viewed his work as having helped struggling students, remarks that drew criticism. In 2025 The Real Deal profiled his subsequent career as a developer.

In 2013, the Lifetime network aired The Cheating Pact, a television film based on Eshaghoff's story, starring Daniela Bobadilla, Laura Ashley Samuels, Laura Slade Wiggins, Max Carver, and Cynthia Gibb.

The Rapid City Journal suggested that the premise of Suits character Mike Ross, who takes the LSAT for other students, echoed Eshaghoff's widely publicized case, which had made national headlines shortly before the series debuted.
