= Jessica Silver-Greenberg =

American journalist

Jessica Silver-Greenberg is a business reporter for The New York Times whose investigative reporting on consumer financial issues has been cited in the U.S. Supreme Court and the U.S. Congress.

Silver-Greenberg was a finalist for the 2016 Pulitzer Prize for Investigative Reporting for a series of New York Times articles that revealed how corporations use binding arbitration to prevent American consumers from suing for relief in the judicial system. She was also a finalist for the 2012 Pulitzer Prize for National Reporting for her 2011 series in The Wall Street Journal revealing the increasingly exploitative tactics of debt collectors. Additional recognition includes the New York Press Club Award for consumer reporting and the Newswomen's Club of New York Award for Best Bylined Front Page Story.

Silver-Greenberg has reported for The New York Times since March 2012. She lives in Brooklyn, New York.

== Early life and career ==
Silver-Greenberg was born in New York City but grew up in Los Angeles. An early influence was her grandmother, "who never forgot a birthday and taught her how to be a sleuth". Her father was Richard Alan Greenberg, an Oscar-nominated special effects designer.

In 2004, Silver-Greenberg earned her bachelor's degree in English literature and American studies from Princeton University. After a stint as an investigator in the Neighborhood Defender Service of Harlem, Silver-Greenberg began her journalism career in 2007 as a consumer finance reporter for BusinessWeek. She then worked as a projects and investigations reporter at Bloomberg between in 2010 before serving as a reporter for The Wall Street Journal’s Money & Investing section from July 2010 to March 2012.

She joined The New York Times in March 2012.

== 2012: Wall Street Journal investigation of debt collectors ==
In 2012, Silver-Greenberg was nominated for the Pulitzer Prize for National Reporting for her Wall Street Journal investigation on the U.S. debt collection industry. The Pulitzer citation highlights "her compelling examination of aggressive debt collectors whose often questionable tactics, profitable but largely unseen by the public, vexed borrowers hard hit by the nation's financial crisis".

Her March 17, 2011 article, "Welcome to Debtors' Prison, 2011 Edition", revealed that the debt collectors increasingly sought after the 2008 financial crisis to have borrowers who couldn't pay arrested and put in jail, often as a result of "sloppy, incomplete or even false documentation that can result in borrowers having no idea before being locked up that they were sued to collect an outstanding debt". Other articles in the series reported on the record number of complaints filed with the Federal Trade Commission in 2011 against the debt collection industry and the aggressive tactics used by “death debt collectors” to collect money from family members of the deceased. U.S. Senator Sherrod Brown cited one of Silver-Greenberg's articles on the use of credit card offers to secure payment on already-expired debts in a letter calling on the Consumer Financial Protection Bureau to ban the practice.

== 2016: New York Times investigation of forced arbitration ==
After moving to The New York Times in 2012, Silver-Greenberg became a finalist for the 2016 Pulitzer Prize for Investigative Reporting for her reporting, along with New York Times reporters Michael Corkery and Robert Gebeloff, on the growing pattern of companies and banks using obscure clauses in contracts to require consumers to resolve disputes through private arbitration, effectively preventing consumers from using the judicial system to do so. Six articles in this series between November 1 and November 21, 2015, were nominated.

"By inserting individual arbitration clauses into a soaring number of consumer and employment contracts", Silver and her fellow New York Times reporters explained, "companies like American Express devised a way to circumvent the courts and bar people from joining together in class-action lawsuits, realistically the only tool citizens have to fight illegal or deceitful business practices". The reporters combed through thousands of federal court records between 2010 and 2014 and conducted interviews with people involved in those cases to produce the series.

The series had an immediate impact. In Washington, U.S. Senators Patrick Leahy and Al Franken, joined by 14 others, wrote a letter to President Obama the month the series was published highlighting the New York Times reporting and calling for more action on forced arbitration. Leahy and Franken introduced a bill the following year seeking to impose new restrictions on arbitration.

In the U.S. House of Representatives, Representative Hank Johnson said the "exhaustive and thoughtful series by The New York Times cataloguing the immense harms of forced arbitration should shake Congress into action". Supreme Court Justice Ruth Bader Ginsburg cited the first article of the series in her dissent in the case Directv, inc. v Imburgia et al.

A backlash from supporters of arbitration also followed the publication. Theodore J. St. Antoine, a professor emeritus at the University of Michigan Law School and former president of the National Academy of Arbitrators, wrote in a letter to the editor in The New York Times that private arbitration is "cheaper, faster, at least as fair and far more accessible to the average consumer or employee than a costly, complicated court action" and that "the ban on class actions is the true villain". Groups like the U.S. Chamber of Commerce and the American Action Network purchased attack ads against the Consumer Financial Protection Bureau (CFPB), which sought to restrict arbitration, and lobbied in Congress to restrict the CFPB's powers.

The forced arbitration series continued to receive attention in Washington well after its initial publication. In 2017, during the Senate confirmation hearing of Neil Gorsuch as a justice on the U.S. Supreme Court, Senator Al Franken asked Gorsuch directly if he had read The New York Times investigation and pressed Gorsuch regarding his stance on forced arbitration.
