= Jacob Seidenberg =

American government official

Personal details
- Born: October 25, 1914 New York City, New York, U.S.
- Died: October 16, 1996 (aged 81) Arlington County, Virginia, U.S.
- Education: Temple University (BA); University of Pennsylvania (LLB); Cornell University (PhD)

Jacob Seidenberg (October 25, 1914 – October 16, 1996) was an American attorney and government official who specialized in labor arbitration and non-discrimination contracts, and wrote extensively on labor law and negotiations.

== Early life and education ==
Seidenberg was born in New York City and was raised in Philadelphia. He graduated from Temple University in 1937 and received a law degree from the University of Pennsylvania Law School in 1941. In 1948, he earned a PhD in industrial and labor relations from Cornell University in 1951.

== Career ==
During the 1940s, he was an attorney with the United States Department of War, the National War Labor Board, and the Wage Stabilization Board.

In 1951 he joined the staff of the President’s Committee on Government Contract Compliance. The Committee was abolished by President Dwight D. Eisenhower in August 1953 by Executive Order 10479 and was succeeded by the President’s Committee on Government Contracts. Seidenberg was appointed executive director of the new committee and served until January 1960 when he resigned to become a full-time labor arbitrator. The committee was responsible for enforcing non-discrimination clauses in government contracts, worked with private businesses to help them overcome job discrimination, and developed educational programs against ethnic and racial discrimination. The chairman was Vice President Richard Nixon, and the vice chairman was Secretary of Labor James P. Mitchell.

In later years, Seidenberg served on a number of boards of inquiry involving labor disputes. From 1970 to 1975, he was chairman of the Federal Services Impasses Panel, which settled deadlocks in federal labor negotiations.

== Death ==
Seidenberg died in Arlington County, Virginia at the age of 81. He had previously lived in Falls Church, Virginia.
