= The Disposable American =

2006 book by Louis Uchitelle

The Disposable American: Layoffs and Their Consequences
- Author: Louis Uchitelle
- Language: English
- Published: 2006 (Alfred A. Knopf)

The Disposable American: Layoffs and Their Consequences is a 2006 book written by New York Times reporter Louis Uchitelle, and it was his first. It was published by Alfred A. Knopf, Inc. The book is concerned with what the author sees as the far reaching layoffs occurring in the United States, the damage he perceives this causes the country, and the psychological harm he perceives dealt to workers by this phenomenon. According to Uchitelle, the waves of major layoffs are injurious to the United States through three key results: the phenomenon disadvantages companies, thus leaving them unable to compete, it has removed numerous middle class jobs, and it disadvantages former middle-class workers who are often forced to work lower paying jobs.
