= Louis Uchitelle =

American novelist

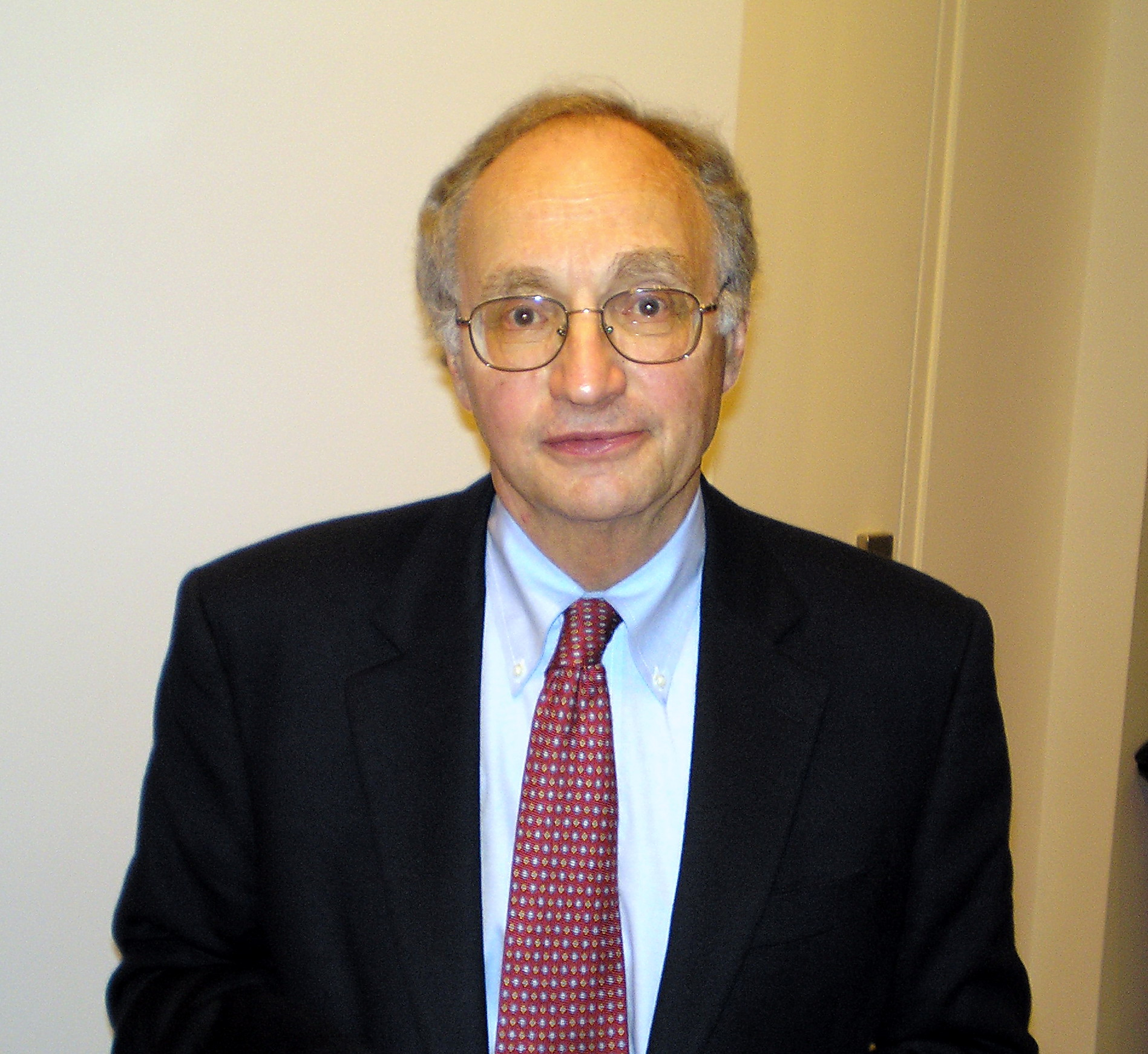
Louis Uchitelle

Louis Uchitelle (born March 21, 1932) is a journalist and author. He worked for The New York Times from 1980 to 2010, first as an editor in the business news department (1980–1987) and then as a business and economics writer (1987–2010). He was the lead reporter for the series The Downsizing of America, which won a George Polk Award in 1996. He won the Gerald Loeb Award for Feature Writing in 2007 for "Rewriting the Social Contract". Since retiring from the Times in 2010, he has been a contributing writer to the newspaper.

Uchitelle joined The Times in 1980 from the Associated Press, where he had been a reporter, editor, and foreign correspondent in Latin America, as well as a news executive.

From 1967 to 1973 he was bureau chief in Buenos Aires, Argentina, reporting such stories as the rise and fall of the Tupamaro urban guerrillas in neighboring Uruguay, the Argentine guerrilla movement, the numerous economic issues and trends in Latin America's southern cone countries, the return of Juan Domingo Perón, and the election of a Peronist government in 1973.

From 1964 to 1967, he was the AP's correspondent and bureau chief in San Juan, Puerto Rico, with responsibility for the Caribbean. His reporting included heavy emphasis on economics, at a time when the islands were trying to form an economic union. He played a lead role in AP's coverage of the U.S. military intervention in the Dominican Republic in 1965.

Uchitelle began in journalism as a general assignment reporter on The Mount Vernon (N.Y.) Daily Argus. He grew up in Great Neck, New York and received a B.A. degree from the University of Michigan.

He has taught news and feature writing at Columbia University. In March 2006 Knopf published his book, The Disposable American: Layoffs and Their Consequences. In May 2017 The New Press published his book, Making It, Why Manufacturing Still Matters. He lives in Scarsdale, New York.
