= Harris Wulfson =

Harris Wulfson (18 July 1974 – 23 July 2008) was an American composer, instrumentalist and software engineer in Brooklyn, New York. His work employed algorithmic processes and gestural controllers to explore the boundary where humans encounter their machines.

He was involved in the creation of various custom software tools called Automatic Notation Generators (ANGs) developed to aid in the creation of algorithmic instrumental compositions. His writing on live generated music notation has been presented at the New Interfaces for Musical Expression conference, and in August 2007, he spoke on the topic of ANGs at the International Computer Music Conference in Copenhagen, Denmark.

For the 2006 Look and Listen Festival in New York City, Wulfson presented his 'SensorBall,' a small electronic device, slightly larger than a baseball, with pressure-sensitive controls, all wired to a laptop computer and the results channeled through loudspeakers. When pressed and rotated, the ball produces sounds that erupt apparently without pattern.

Wulfson graduated from Amherst College and later received an MFA from the California Institute of the Arts. His teachers included Stephen Mosko, Morton Subotnick, James Tenney, and Lew Spratlan.

Wulfson was also an accomplished violinist, accordionist, and mandolin player, an active performer of experimental music, and an avid folk musician. He was a member of the Object Collection ensemble and the Society of Automatic Music Notators, which initiated the LiveScore real-time music notation project, and has performed with the World on a String band, King Wilkie, Metropolitan Klezmer, Golem, and Margot Leverett.

In addition, Wulfson was a software engineer and web pioneer. He was the technical project manager at N2K Inc. from August, 1996 through March 1998. He built the bulletin board for jazzcentralstation.com and was the creator of "The Empty Chair."

On July 23, 2008, he died by suicide by throwing himself under a train In December 2008, Scrapple Records issued a recording of Jeremy Woodruff's Tunebook A as realized by the AB Duo (Seth Meicht and Jeremy Woodruff on saxophones and flute), a work dedicated to Wulfson.
