= Professionals in the City =

Washington, DC based networking organization

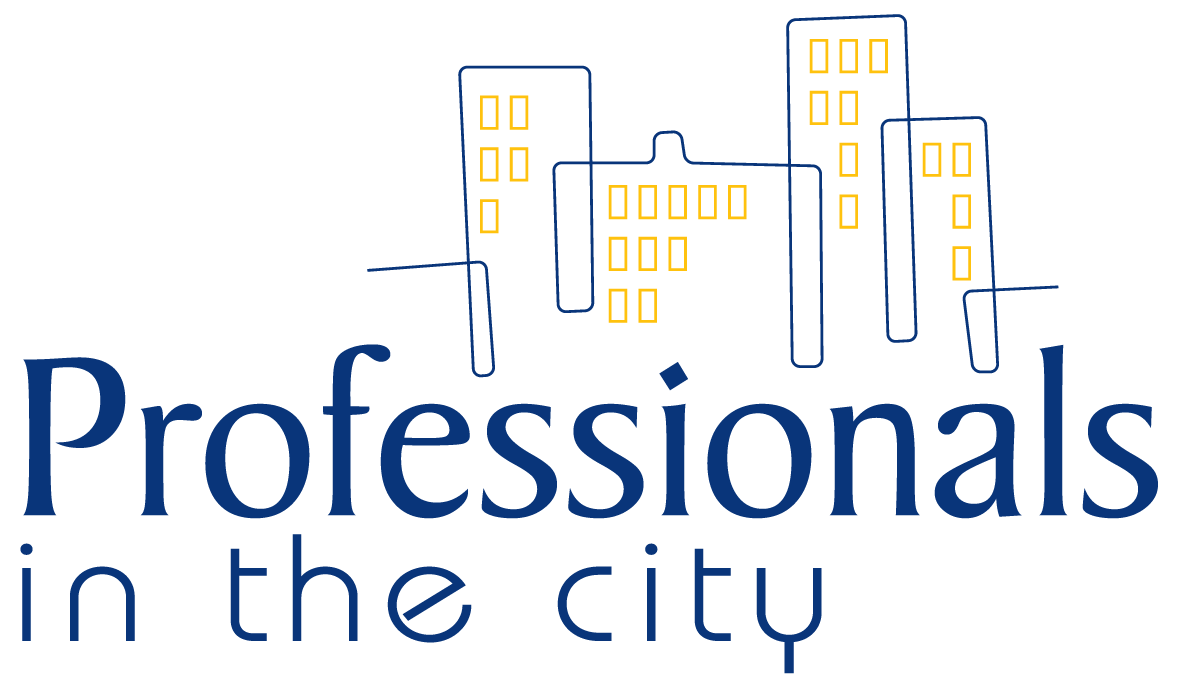
- Abbreviation: PNC
- Formation: 1999; 27 years ago
- Type: Private social club
- Legal status: Active
- Location: Washington, D.C.
- Members: 200,000
- Key people: Michael Karlan

Professionals in the City (commonly known as PNC) is a socializing and networking private organization based out in Washington, DC, with branches in New York City, Los Angeles, Philadelphia, Baltimore, and Boston.

It was founded in 1999 by Michael Karlan, who serves as the incumbent president of the organization. PNC has 200,000 members and hosts more than 1,000 events a year.

== History ==
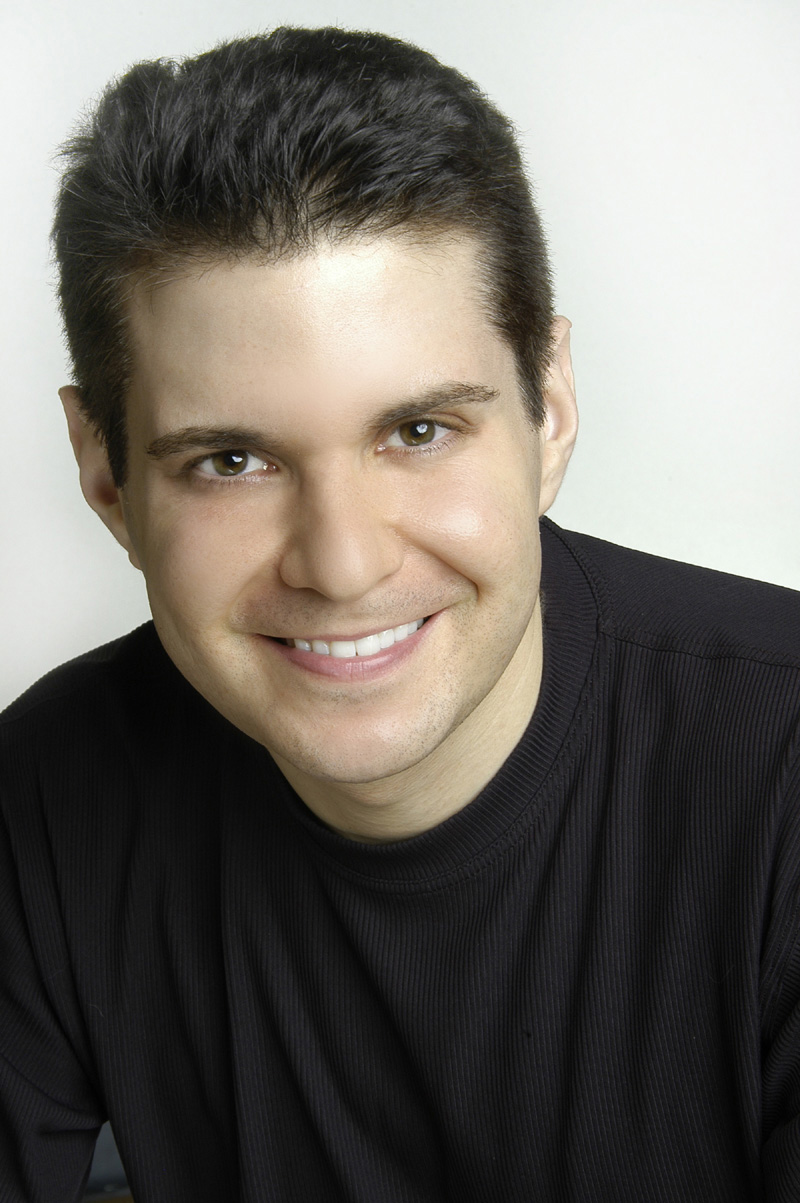
The founder, Michael Karlan

Professionals in the City was established in 1999 in Washington D.C. by Michael Karlan, an American attorney and social entrepreneur. He had earlier worked in organizations including the Office of Chief Counsel of the Internal Revenue Service, where he drafted federal regulations relating to 401(k) plans.

While living in Washington, Karlan began organizing happy hours and parties after finding it difficult to meet people outside of work, and decided to turn those events into a business. From the beginning, Professionals in the City was a social club for events including singles dinners, museum outings, wine tastings, and paintball trips. By 2006, it was hosting about 1,000 mixers and social seminars each year. Later that year, when he was simultaneously hosting New Year's Eve Galas at both the French embassy and the Washington Plaza Hotel, The Washington Post described him as "an expert party guy." In 2010, Washington, DC Mayor Adrian Fenty commended Karlan for growing Professionals in the City to more than 200,000 members in the greater Washington metropolitan area.

In 2020, during the COVID-19 pandemic and lockdown restrictions in the United States, PNC switched to "virtual speed dating" by using video-conferencing applications such as Zoom.

== Organization and activities ==
PNC organizes community events in Washington DC, Baltimore, Boston, Los Angeles, New York, and Philadelphia. It hosts events showcasing cities' offerings, including their nightlife, arts, cultural and sporting events, and neighborhoods. Many of the events have a matchmaking focus, such as speed dating. The organization hosts local dating coaches who give seminars on general principles of dating and attraction, as well as specific topics, such as body language. PNC is known for organizing dating events for ethnic, age and LGBT groups.
