= Philip Christ =

Politician and businessman from New Hyde Park, New York, United States

Philip J. Christ

Town Supervisor of North Hempstead, New York
- In office 1907–1917
- Preceded by: Edwin C. Willets
- Succeeded by: Cornelius E. Remsen

Personal details
- Born: 1872 New Hyde Park, New York
- Died: August 24, 1933 (aged 61) New Hyde Park, New York
- Party: Democratic
- Spouse: Anna W. Gottsch
- Children: 2

Philip Christ was an American politician and businessman who served as the Town Supervisor of North Hempstead, New York, from 1907 to 1917 and as the Chairman of the Nassau County Board of Supervisors.

== Biography ==
Philip Christ was born on April 25, 1872 to one of the oldest families in New Hyde Park, New York, with his ancestors having been some of the community's earliest settlers.

=== Career ===
Christ began his political career in 1899. He was subsequently elected as the Town Supervisor of North Hempstead in 1906, and he served in that capacity from 1907 to 1917. Through this role, he represented North Hempstead on the Nassau County Board of Supervisors; he would eventually become the Chairman of the Board of Supervisors.

As Town Supervisor, he was responsible for the naming of Marcus Avenue – a major thoroughfare in western North Hempstead. Upon inspecting the construction of the road in 1910 and speaking with the Superintendent of Highways, he inquired as to what the road's name would be, and, at the Superintendent's suggestion, decided to name the road Marcus Avenue, in honor of his son.

In April 1917, Christ retired from politics, from politics in April 1917, when he resigned as Town Supervisor to join a real estate firm. He was succeeded by Republican Cornelius E. Remsen, of Roslyn. He was the last Democrat to serve as North Hempstead's Town Supervisor until Benjamin L. Zwirn in 1990 – along with being the last to hold any position in the North Hempstead Town Council until 1975, when Barbara S. Blumberg (D–Lake Success) and Richard S. Paige (D–Manhasset) were sworn in as members of the Town Council.

Christ was also involved in banking, serving as the President of the New Hyde Park Bank and as the Vice President of the First National Bank of Mineola. He further was engaged in selling farm implements and seeds, and served as both the Vice President and Director of the Queens–Nassau Agricultural Society.

=== Death ===
On August 24, 1933, Christ died from heart disease in his New Hyde Park home. He was 61 years-old.

=== Personal life ===
Christ lived at 5 Millers Lane in the Village of New Hyde Park and was married to Anna W. Gottsch Christ. They had two children: a daughter and a son. Their son, Marcus G. Christ, served as a justice for the New York Supreme Court, Appellate Division, Second Department, and as the President of the Nassau County Bar Association.

== See also ==
- List of United States political families (C)
- May W. Newburger
- Sol Wachtler
- J. Russell Sprague
