= County Route 11 (Nassau County, New York) =

Road on Long Island, New York

- CR 11, highlighted in red

Route information
- Maintained by NCDPW
- Length: 6.46 mi (10.40 km)
- Existed: 1959–present

Major junctions
- South end: NY 25 (Jericho Turnpike) in New Hyde Park
- NY 25B (Hillside Avenue) in North New Hyde Park; Northern State Parkway in Lake Success; NY 25A (Northern Boulevard) at the Lake Success–Thomaston–University Gardens border
- North end: Redbrook Road (CR E04) and Grassfield Road at the Great Neck–Kings Point border

Location
- Country: United States
- State: New York
- County: Nassau

Highway system
- County routes in New York; County Routes in Nassau County

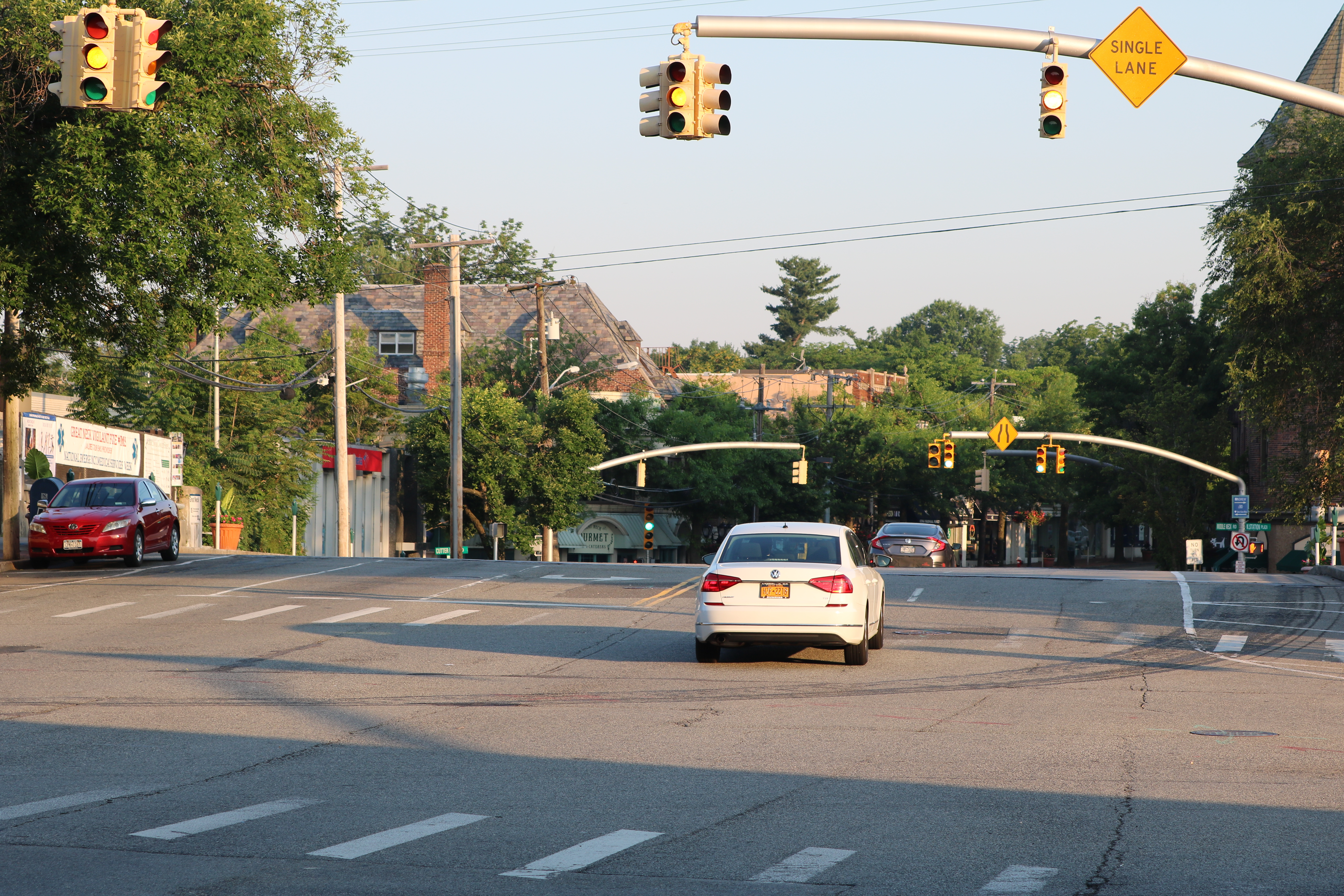
Middle Neck Road (CR 11) in Great Neck

County Route 11 (CR 11) is a major, 6.46-mile (10.40 km) county road connecting New Hyde Park and Kings Point, in Nassau County, on Long Island, New York. The unsigned, north–south county route is the primary road serving the Great Neck Peninsula and a major access road for the United States Merchant Marine Academy. CR 11 consists of Lakeville Road and Middle Neck Road.

CR 11, in its entirety, is owned by Nassau County and is maintained by the Nassau County Department of Public Works (NCDPW).

== Route description ==
CR 11 consists of two component roadways: Lakeville Road and Middle Neck Road; the two roads meet at New York State Route 25A (NY 25A, Northern Boulevard) on the south end of the Great Neck Peninsula.

=== Lakeville Road (New Hyde Park to NY 25A) ===
CR 11 begins at Jericho Turnpike (NY 25) in the incorporated village of New Hyde Park, as Lakeville Road. From this at-grade intersection, the highway travels north-northeast, eventually reaching Bryant Avenue at the border between the village of New Hyde Park and North New Hyde Park. From there, it continues north-northeast and soon reaches Hillside Avenue (NY 25B), before continuing north and west through North New Hyde Park until reaching Union Turnpike at the border between Nassau County and the New York City borough of Queens.

North of Union Turnpike, the road continues northeast and simultaneously straddles the Nassau–Queens and Lake Success–North New Hyde Park borders, soon reaching 77th Street and veering north, along the border between North New Hyde Park and the village of Lake Success. On this border, the Queens side of this road is designated by the city's Department of Transportation as Hewlett Street.

It soon thereafter intersects with the entrance to Long Island Jewish Medical Center—still along the Lake Success–New Hyde Park border, before fully entering Lake Success slightly to the north. It then curves north-northwest and reaches an intersection with Marcus Avenue (CR D46). CR 11 then crosses over the Northern State Parkway, intersecting with its westbound on-/off-ramps (exit 25 N–S) just north of the overpass.

From the Northern State Parkway, CR 11 veers back to the north-northeast, continuing its way through Lake Success, with the kettle lake for which the village is named and the Lake Success Golf Club on its west side, and Great Neck South Middle School on its east side; it passes the former Long Island Motor Parkway just south of the middle school. It then reaches (and passes below) the Long Island Expressway (I-495) shortly thereafter, connecting to it at exit 33 via Horace Harding Boulevard and Fairway Drive and the South Service Road. From there, it continues north through Lake Success, eventually reaching Northern Boulevard (NY 25A) and Middle Neck Road at the Lake Success–Thomaston–University Gardens tripoint; Lakeville Road's name changes to Middle Neck Road at this location.

=== Middle Neck Road (north of NY 25A) ===
From the intersection with NY 25A, CR 11 continues northwest via Middle Neck Road, along the border between University Gardens and the village of Thomaston, soon reaching Russel Woods Road at the Russell Gardens–Thomaston–University Gardens tripoint. It continues northwest from there along the border between the villages of Russell Gardens and Thomaston, soon thereafter entering the village of Great Neck Plaza and then intersecting Barstow Road. It then reaches an intersection of Great Neck Road (CR D01) and South Station Plaza one block later, at the Great Neck station on the Port Washington Branch of the Long Island Rail Road. It then bridges over the station and tracks, intersecting with Cutter Mill Road (CR C55) and North Station Plaza immediately thereafter. It then curves towards the north-northwest, reaching Grace Avenue (CR C96) one block later, at the border between the villages of Great Neck Estates and Great Neck Plaza.

North of Grace Avenue, CR 11—still heading north-northwest along the Great Neck Estates–Great Neck Plaza border—eventually reaches an intersection with Cedar Drive (CR C32). It continues north-northwest from there along the Great Neck Estates–Kensington village border, and eventually reaches Embassy Court at the tripoint between the villages of Great Neck Estates and Kensington and the hamlet of Great Neck Gardens. From there, it curves north and soon reaches Clover Drive at the border between the villages of Great Neck and Great Neck Estates; it fully enters the village of Great Neck shortly north of this point. CR 11 soon thereafter reaches an intersection with Old Mill Road (CR D78) and Piccadilly Road, and then winds its way through the heart of the village of Great Neck, eventually passing the Great Neck Village High School before intersecting with Arrandale Avenue (CR C01) and Hicks Lane (CR D15). It then continues north, soon intersecting Steamboat Road (CR E31) before shortly thereafter reaching an intersection with Redbrook Road (CR E04) at the Great Neck–Kings Point village border; this location marks the northern terminus of the CR 11 designation and Nassau County's ownership of Middle Neck Road.

North of the intersection with Redbrook Road, Middle Neck Road continues north through Kings Point as a village-maintained road.

== History ==
In 1934, the Long Island Rail Road eliminated Middle Neck Road's grade crossing at the Great Neck station. This resulted in the tracks and station being depressed into an open cut, and a new bridge carrying Middle Neck Road being constructed; the elimination of the grade crossing improved safety and the flow of vehicles, pedestrians, and trains.

In the 1960s, the NCDPW proposed widening the Lakeville Road section of CR 11 between Union Turnpike and the Long Island Expressway. The proposal called for the road to be widened from four lanes to six, in order to alleviate congestion along that portion of the road. The plan received significant opposition from Lake Success residents and officials.

By 1970, proposals were made to widen a portion of Lakeville Road in Lake Success—this time to the north, from the Long Island Expressway north to Northern Boulevard. The proposal called for this heavily utilized, two-lane stretch of Lakeville Road to four lanes. It, too, received significant opposition. This project was eventually approved, and work eventually started. However, the contractor declared bankruptcy and as of 2024, this segment of Lakeville Road remains two-lanes wide.

=== Route designation and signage ===
The former route shield for CR 11

Like all of the other county routes in Nassau County, CR 11 became unsigned in the 1970s, when Nassau County officials opted to remove the signs as opposed to allocating the funds for replacing them with new ones that met the latest federal design standards and requirements, as per the federal government's Manual on Uniform Traffic Control Devices.

The CR 11 designation previously continued west from its current northern terminus, along Redbrook Road (CR E04). The route was truncated to the Middle Neck Road–Redbrook Road intersection following the removal of the county route signage—after which point the route numbering system was overhauled.

== Major intersections ==
Location	mi	km	Destinations	Notes
New Hyde Park	0.00	0.00	NY 25 (Jericho Turnpike) – New York, Orient Point; South 9th Street	At-grade intersection; southern terminus of Lakeville Road and CR 11
New Hyde Park–North New Hyde Park line	0.43	0.69	Bryant Avenue	
North New Hyde Park	0.84	1.35	NY 25B (Hillside Avenue) – New York, Westbury	At-grade intersection
North New Hyde Park	1.22	1.96	80th Avenue	
Lake Success–North New Hyde Park– Queens tripoint	1.61	2.59	Union Turnpike	
Lake Success	2.12	3.41	Marcus Avenue (CR D46)	To Northern State Parkway east – Hauppauge
Lake Success	2.22	3.57	Northern State Parkway west – New York	Exit 25 N–S on the Northern State Parkway
Lake Success	2.87	4.62	South Service Road	To I-495 east – Riverhead
Lake Success	2.97	4.78	Horace Harding Boulevard / Fairway Drive	To I-495 west – New York
Lake Success–Thomaston– University Gardens tripoint	3.87	6.23	NY 25A (Northern Boulevard) – New York, Calverton	At-grade intersection; road name changes from Lakeville Road to Middle Neck Road
Russell Gardens–Thomaston– University Gardens tripoint	4.01	6.45	Russell Woods Road	
Great Neck Plaza–Russell Gardens– Thomaston tripoint	4.21	6.78	Overlook Avenue	
Great Neck Plaza–Thomaston line	4.39	7.07	Schenck Avenue; Pont Street	
Great Neck Plaza	4.49	7.23	Great Neck Road (CR D01); South Station Plaza	Access to Great Neck LIRR station
Great Neck Plaza	4.56	7.34	Cutter Mill Road (CR C55); North Station Plaza	Access to Great Neck LIRR station
Great Neck Plaza	4.66	7.50	Grace Avenue (CR C96); Grace Avenue Extension	
Great Neck Estates–Great Neck Plaza line	4.82	7.76	Cedar Drive (CR C32)	
Great Neck Estates–Great Neck Gardens– Kensington tripoint	5.07	8.16	Embassy Court	
Great Neck–Great Neck Estates line	5.23	8.42	Clover Drive	
Great Neck	5.40	8.69	Old Mill Road (CR D78); Piccadilly Road	
Great Neck	6.01	9.67	Arrandale Avenue (CR C01); Hicks Lane (CR D15)	
Great Neck	6.19	9.96	Steamboat Road (CR E31)	Access to the United States Merchant Marine Academy
Great Neck–Kings Point line	6.46	10.40	Redbrook Road (CR E04); Grassfield Road	Northern terminus of CR 11 and Nassau County ownership and maintenance of Middle Neck Road
1.000 mi = 1.609 km; 1.000 km = 0.621 mi: Route transition

== County Route 11A ==
County Route 11A
- Community Drive
- Location: Lake Success–Manhasset
- Length: 1.35 mi (2.17 km)
- Existed: 1959–present

County Route 11A (CR 11A) is a major, 1.35-mile (2.17 km) county road known as Community Drive for its entire length, connecting Lake Success and Manhasset, in Nassau County, on Long Island, New York. The unsigned, north–south county route is the primary road serving North Shore University Hospital. Despite being an auxiliary route of CR 11, CR 11A never connects directly to its parent.

CR 11A, in its entirety, is owned by Nassau County and is maintained by the Nassau County Department of Public Works (NCDPW).

=== Route description ===
CR 11A begins at the South Service Road of the Long Island Expressway (I-495) in Lake Success, at Exit 33 of I-495. It then runs north-northeast, crossing beneath I-495 and immediately reaching the North Service Road, as well as Exit 33's westbound on-/off-ramps. From there, the road curves northwards, soon entering Manhasset and passing (and providing access to) North Shore University Hospital and The Feinstein Institutes for Medical Research.

North of the hospital, Community Drive curves slightly to the north-northwest, passing the Greentree Foundation's property before coming to an intersection with Community Drive East. It then continues north-northwest, passing Whitney Pond Park before reaching an intersection with Northern Boulevard (NY 25A) and East Shore Road (CR E25); this location marks the northern terminus of Community Drive and the CR 11A designation, and the roadway becomes East Shore Road (CR E25) on the north side of the intersection.

=== History ===
The former route shield for CR 11A

Like all of the other county routes in Nassau County, CR 11A became unsigned in the 1970s, when Nassau County officials opted to remove the signs as opposed to allocating the funds for replacing them with new ones that met the latest federal design standards and requirements, as per the federal government's Manual on Uniform Traffic Control Devices.

The CR 11A designation previously extended from I-495 Exit 33 in Lake Success to West Shore Road in Kings Point, via Community Drive, East Shore Road, Hicks Lane, and Arrandale Avenue, prior to the Nassau County altering its county route numbering scheme; it connected to CR 11 (its parent) within the Village of Great Neck.

=== Major intersections ===
Location	mi	km	Destinations	Notes
Lake Success	0.00	0.00	South Service Road	To I-495 east – Riverhead; southern terminus of Community Drive & CR 11A; eastbound traffic only Exit 33 on I-495
Lake Success	0.05	0.080	North Service Road	To I-495 west – New York; westbound traffic only Exit 33 on I-495
Manhasset	0.53	0.85	Hospital access road	Main entrance to North Shore University Hospital
Manhasset	0.86	1.38	Valley Road	
Manhasset	1.08	1.74	Community Drive East	Access to Whitney Pond Park
Manhasset	1.35	2.17	NY 25A (Northern Boulevard) – New York, Calverton; East Shore Road (CR E25)	At-grade intersection Northern terminus of Community Drive and CR 11A designation; roadway continues north as East Shore Road (CR E25)
1.000 mi = 1.609 km; 1.000 km = 0.621 mi

== See also ==
- List of county routes in Nassau County, New York
