= 2025 Nassau County Legislature election =

2025 Nassau County, New York legislature elections
- November 4, 2025

All 19 seats to the Nassau County Legislature

	Majority party	Minority party
Party	Republican	Democratic
Last election	12	7
Seats won	11	8
Seat change	▼1	▲1
Popular vote	167,302	137,286
Percentage	54.90%	45.05%

The 2025 Nassau County Legislature election was held on November 4, 2025, to elect the 19 legislators in Nassau County, New York, one from each of the county's legislative districts. The elections coincided with other elections in the county and state.

The Republican Party maintained their majority from the 2023 election, but lost a seat.

== Results ==
Prior to the election, the Westchester County Supreme Court issued a ruling declaring the previous legislature map to be void as it disproportionally benefitted the Republican Party. A new map was made, redrawing multiple districts and helping the Democrats gain the 14th district.

=== Countywide ===
2025 Nassau County, New York, Legislature election
Party	Votes	Percentage	Seats	+/–
Republican	167,302	54.90%	11	▼1
Democratic	137,286	45.05%	8	▲1
Write-in	167	0.05%	0	
Totals	304,755	100.00%	19	

=== By district ===
District	Republican		Democratic		Others		Total		Result
District	Votes	%	Votes	%	Votes	%	Votes	%	Result
1	4,735	33.27%	9,490	66.68%	8	0.06%	14,233	100.00%	Democratic hold
2	3,126	32.46%	6,499	67.49%	5	0.05%	9,630	100.00%	Democratic hold
3	4,359	33.56%	8,617	66.35%	12	0.09%	12,988	100.00%	Democratic hold
4	11,381	59.99%	7,568	39.89%	23	0.12%	18,972	100.00%	Republican hold
5	4,510	42.33%	6,140	57.63%	4	0.04%	10,654	100.00%	Democratic hold
6	4,224	33.80%	8,264	66.13%	8	0.06%	12,496	100.00%	Democratic hold
7	12,256	75.95%	3,872	24.00%	8	0.05%	16,136	100.00%	Republican hold
8	11,823	65.51%	6,217	34.45%	9	0.05%	18,049	100.00%	Republican hold
9	9,092	55.32%	7,331	44.61%	11	0.07%	16,434	100.00%	Republican hold
10	11,520	63.33%	6,661	36.62%	9	0.05%	18,190	100.00%	Republican hold
11	6,808	37.24%	11,463	62.70%	11	0.06%	18,282	100.00%	Democratic hold
12	11,535	58.18%	8,284	41.78%	9	0.05%	19,828	100.00%	Republican hold
13	10,066	61.60%	6,269	38.37%	5	0.03%	16,340	100.00%	Republican hold
14	6,846	44.88%	8,390	55.00%	18	0.12%	15,254	100.00%	Democratic gain
15	13,283	68.37%	6,139	31.60%	5	0.03%	19,427	100.00%	Republican hold
16	7,807	46.75%	8,877	53.16%	14	0.08%	16,698	100.00%	Democratic hold
17	10,187	66.03%	5,234	33.93%	6	0.04%	15,427	100.00%	Republican hold
18	9,430	59.04%	6,533	40.91%	8	0.05%	15,971	100.00%	Republican hold
19	14,314	72.49%	5,428	27.49%	4	0.02%	19,746	100.00%	Republican hold
Total	167,302	54.90%	137,286	45.05%	167	0.05%	304,755	100.00%	
