= Union Turnpike (New York) =

Boulevard on Long Island, New York

Coordinates: 40°43′55.7″N 73°46′4.7″W

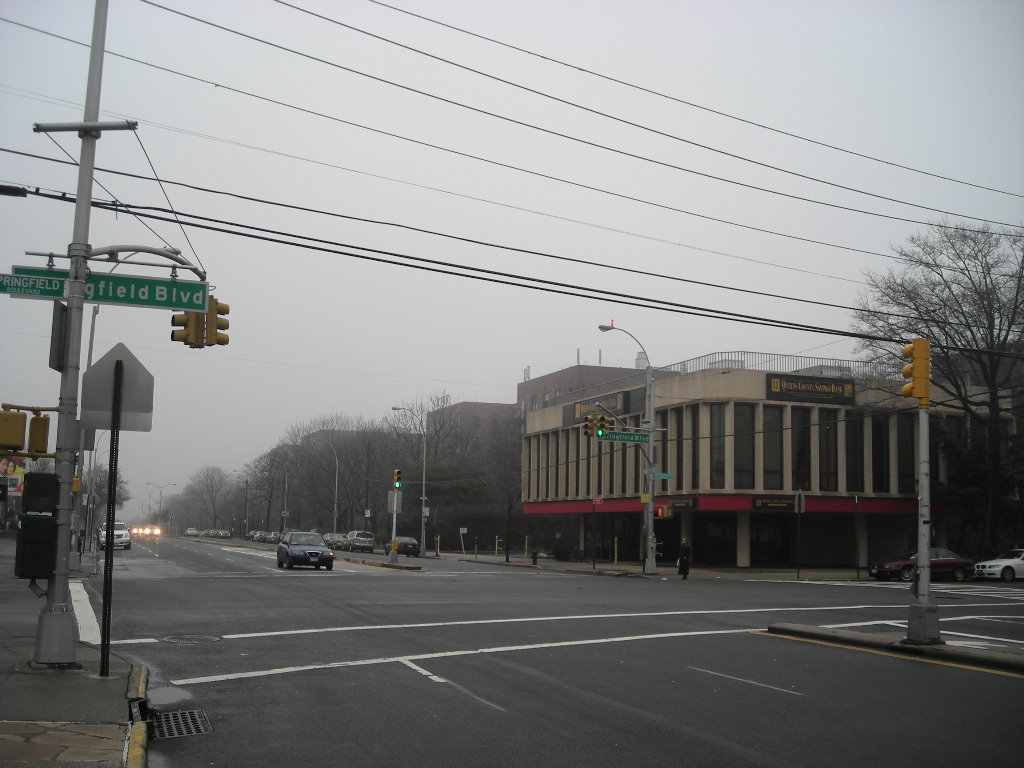
- Intersecting with Springfield Boulevard in Oakland Gardens, Queens
- Interactive map of Union Turnpike
- Maintained by: NYCDOT and the Town of North Hempstead
- Length: 10.0 mi (16.1 km)
- Location: Queens and Nassau County
- Nearest metro station: Kew Gardens–Union Turnpike
- West end: Jackie Robinson Parkway / Myrtle Avenue in Glendale
- Major junctions: I-678 / NY 25 / Grand Central Parkway in Kew Gardens; I-295 in Cunningham Park; Grand Central Parkway in Oakland Gardens; Cross Island Parkway in Bellerose
- East end: Marcus Avenue / New Hyde Park Road in North New Hyde Park

Union Turnpike is a thoroughfare stretching across part of Long Island in southern New York state, mostly within central and eastern Queens in New York City. It runs from the Jackie Robinson Parkway in Glendale, Queens to Marcus Avenue in North New Hyde Park, Nassau County, about 1 mile (1.6 km) outside the New York City border.

Union Turnpike from Myrtle Avenue to the Nassau County border is 9.2 miles (15 km) long. The turnpike crosses into Nassau County at the city's easternmost point on Langdale Street, two blocks past the city's highest-numbered street (271st Street). North of the turnpike at this point is Glen Oaks and south of it is Floral Park. It then enters the hamlet of North New Hyde Park.

== Description ==
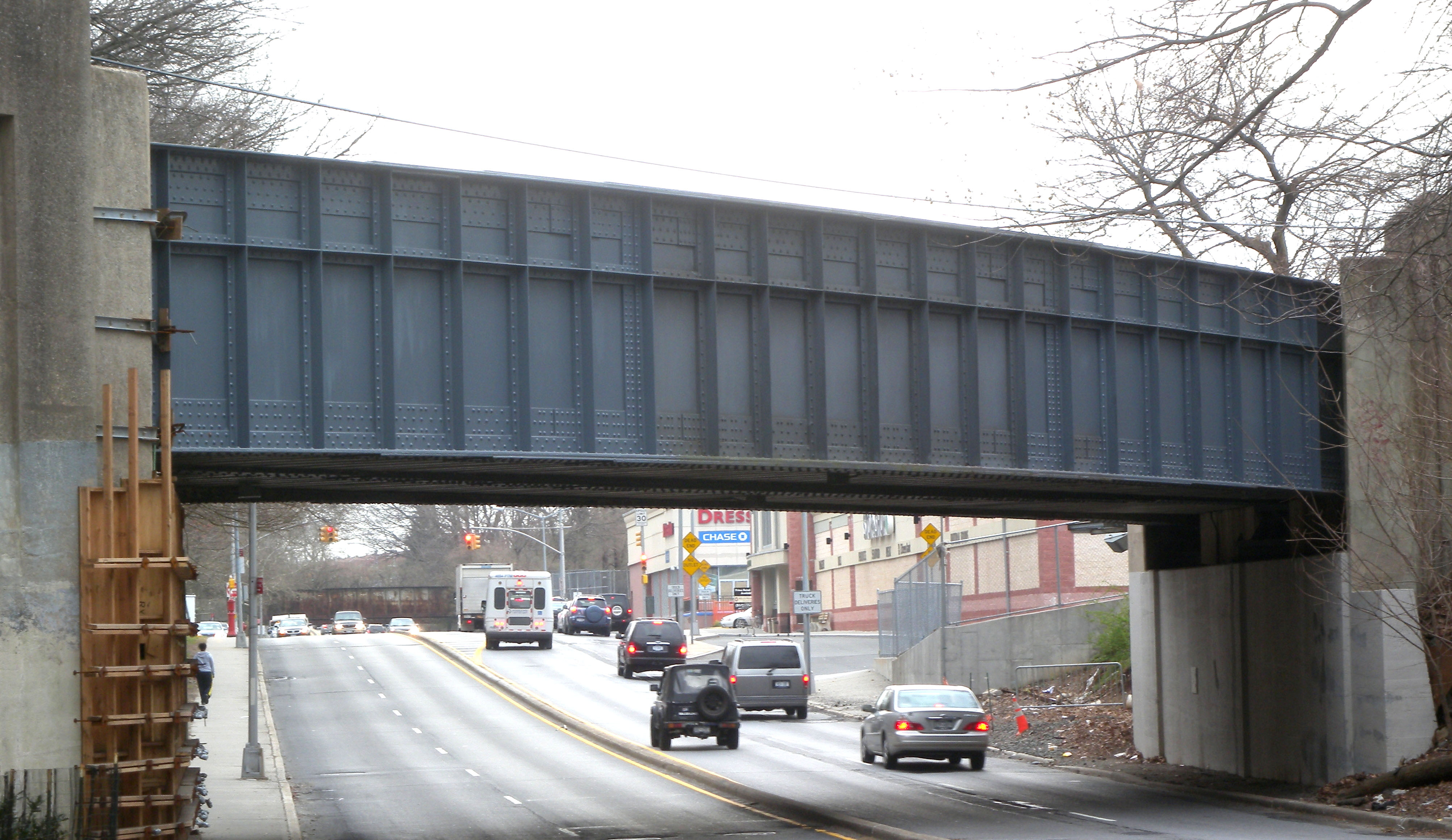
Union Turnpike goes under the Montauk Branch and Rockaway Beach Branch of the LIRR

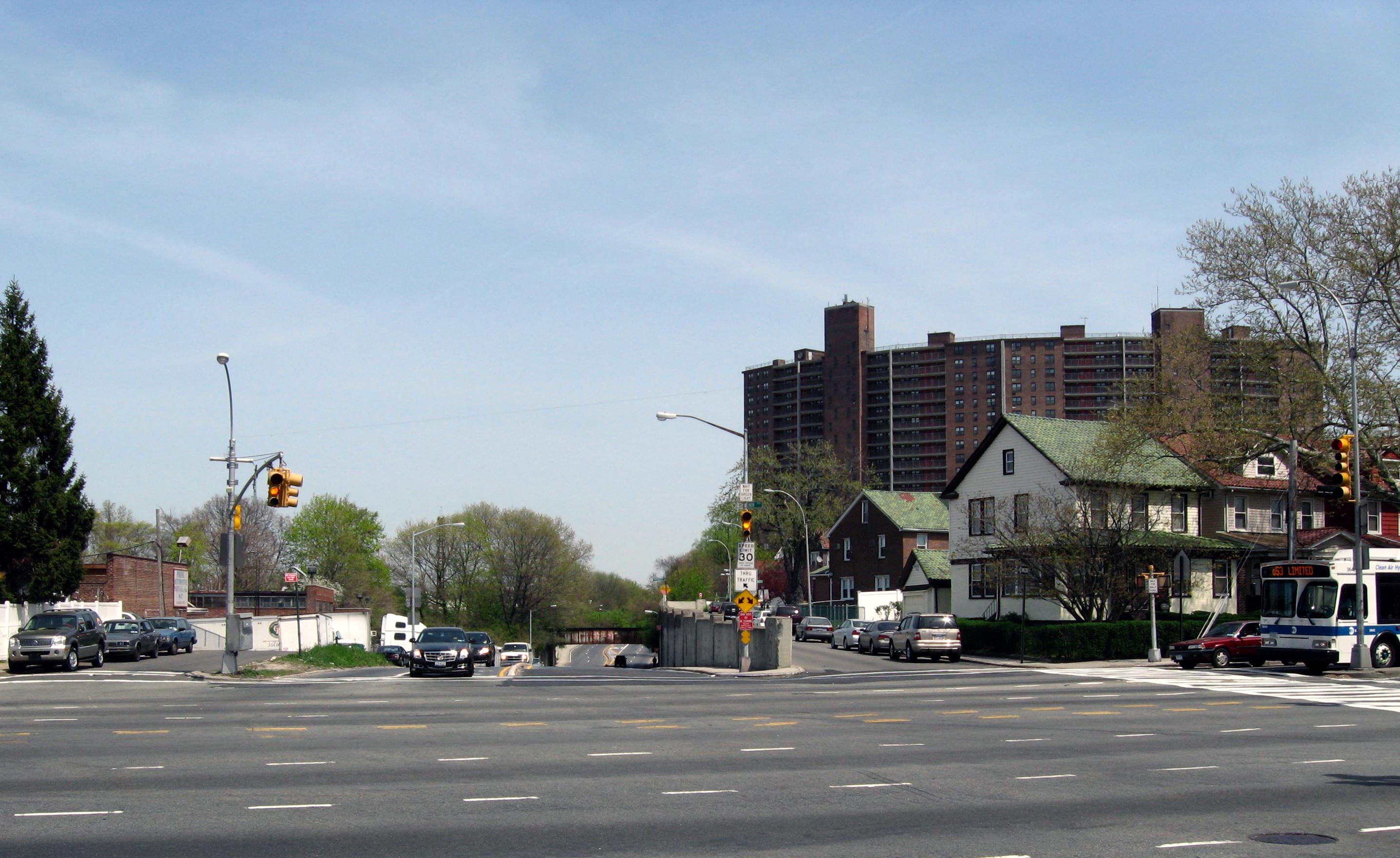
Union Turnpike crosses Woodhaven Boulevard and goes under the LIRR Rockaway Beach Branch

Starting from the intersection of Myrtle Avenue, 86th Street and the Jackie Robinson Parkway's east-bound exit 5 ramps in Glendale, Union Turnpike crosses Woodhaven Boulevard. It continues as the northern boundary of Forest Park to an intersection with Metropolitan Avenue. Just east of here Union Turnpike crosses over the Jackie Robinson Parkway near Exit 6 (Metropolitan Avenue). Union Turnpike then straddles the parkway, but there is no access to or from the parkway to Union Turnpike. This section is between Forest Hills and Kew Gardens.

Soon, Union Turnpike and the parkway go into a tunnel under Queens Boulevard (New York State Highway 25). As the turnpike descends into the tunnel, it gains service roads which feed a diamond interchange with the boulevard. Just after Queens Boulevard, the parkway ends at the Kew Gardens Interchange, connecting with the Van Wyck Expressway (Interstate 678) and the Grand Central Parkway (Exits 7 and 8 on the Jackie Robinson, Exit 10 on the Van Wyck and Exit 13 on the Grand Central). From Union Turnpike here, the eastbound Grand Central and its service road are accessible, but the Van Wyck is not.

Union Turnpike eastbound continues on a bridge over the Grand Central Parkway, gains access to the westbound GCP, then meets up with Union Turnpike westbound just after an intersection with the Grand Central Parkway's westbound service road, with the service road ending here and with that road’s traffic generally continuing onto the westbound turnpike. Just east of this intersection, the road becomes a four-lane divided road. It continues through the neighborhoods within Kew Gardens Hills, where it crosses Main Street and Parsons Boulevard before passing 164th Street in Hillcrest, the western sub-neighborhood of Fresh Meadows. It then passes St. John's University, crossing Utopia Parkway, goes through Utopia, and proceeds into the broader neighborhood of Fresh Meadows when it crosses 188th Street and enters Cunningham Park at an intersection with Francis Lewis Boulevard. Just after Francis Lewis Boulevard is Oakland Gardens in the southern region of Bayside, where it shares a full diamond interchange with I-295, or the Clearview Expressway (Exit 2 on the Clearview).

It then crosses Hollis Court Boulevard before leaving the park going into the north part of the district of Jamaica. It passes through Hollis Hills in Queens Village, crossing Bell Boulevard and Springfield Boulevard. Just after Springfield Boulevard is a full interchange with the Grand Central Parkway (along the Grand Central, Exit 22 eastbound, and exit 23 westbound). After the Grand Central, Union Turnpike goes back into the neighborhood of Bayside, the eastern section of the Flushing district, where it becomes the southern boundary of Alley Pond Park until it intersects with Winchester Boulevard. It then passes the Creedmoor Psychiatric Center, and then shares a full interchange with the Cross Island Parkway (Exit 28B on the Cross Island).

Past here, Union Turnpike crosses Commonwealth Boulevard just after the Cross Island Parkway interchange before passing over Little Neck Parkway into Bellerose, then it passes through the neighborhood of Glen Oaks. It crosses the highest-numbered street in New York City, 271st Street, and then passes the city's easternmost point, at Langdale Street. Just past here, Union Turnpike enters Nassau County, where it intersects with Lakeville Road. It passes a shopping center in Lake Success, crosses New Hyde Park Road, and ends a block east at Marcus Avenue.

=== Character ===
With the exception of a section in Glendale, most of Union Turnpike consists of four traffic lanes divided by a narrow concrete median. The Glendale section contains a wide mall with trees, and in Kew Gardens, the turnpike flanks the Jackie Robinson Parkway crossing over the Main Line of the Long Island Rail Road, before dipping below Queens Boulevard. Though it appears to be a service road for the parkway, it does not function as such. There is no direct access to the parkway, though there is partial access to the Grand Central Parkway. This section has its own full diamond interchange with Queens Boulevard.

=== Former route designation ===
The section of Union Turnpike between Queens Boulevard and Marcus Avenue was New York State Route 25C from the mid-1930s to 1970.

== Transportation ==
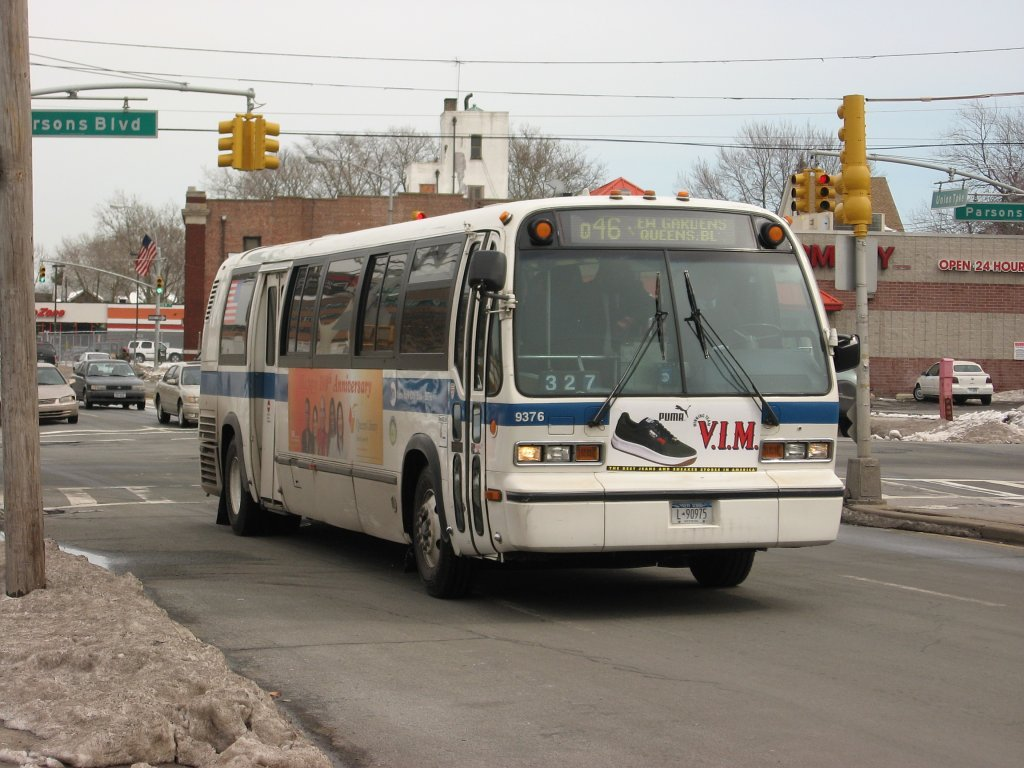
A Q46 RTS-06 bus at Union Turnpike and Parsons Boulevard

The following bus routes serve Union Turnpike:

- The Q45, Q46 and Q48 bus lines travel on Union Turnpike east of Queens Boulevard. The Q45 runs on the road until 188th Street, the Q46 until Lakeville Road, and the Q48 until 260th Street (Glen Oaks).
- Express service on Union Turnpike is provided east of Queens Boulevard by the QM1, QM5, QM7, QM8, QM31 and QM35, which head north on 188th Street, and the QM6 and QM36, which continue to Lakeville Road (Lake Success) or from Hewlett Street (Manhattan). No stop is made until Main Street.
- The Forest Hills-bound Q23, QM12 and QM42 run from 71st Avenue to Woodhaven Boulevard, all changing direction at Crescent Apartments.
- The Kew Gardens-bound Q37 runs from Park Lane to Kew Gardens Road, where it terminates.

In addition, the New York City Subway's Kew Gardens–Union Turnpike station, served by the E, F, and <F> trains, is located at Queens Boulevard.

== Points of interest ==
Among the landmarks located along the turnpike are Forest Park, Queens Borough Hall, St. John's University, Cunningham Park, Alley Pond Park, and Creedmoor Psychiatric Center.

== History ==
Union Turnpike was originally a dirt road, initially designed as a toll road. At the time, Union Turnpike traveled through relatively undeveloped areas, serving as a border between the towns of Flushing and Jamaica. It started at Metropolitan Avenue in Forest Hills and ended at Utopia Parkway near Jamaica.

Prior to the construction of Grand Central Parkway and Interboro Parkway (now the Jackie Robinson Parkway) in the 1930s, Union Turnpike was heavily used, and developed businesses throughout its length. In 1929, there was a proposal to make improvements to four existing roads in order to make them major thoroughfares between Queens and Nassau, namely Astoria Boulevard, Northern Boulevard, Nassau Boulevard, and Union Turnpike. Civic associations in Jamaica opposed the Union Turnpike proposal, and they convinced Queens Borough President George Harvey. Nevertheless, the section of Union Turnpike from Kew Gardens to the Nassau County line was converted from a narrow unpaved road to a paved multi-lane highway in the late 1930s, in advance of the 1939 New York World's Fair. Around the same time, the turnpike was depressed below Queens Boulevard in conjunction with the construction of the Queens Boulevard Subway, and extended eastward from Fresh Meadows towards Marcus Avenue in Nassau County.

Prior to 1970, the section of Union Turnpike to the east of Queens Boulevard was designated as New York State Route 25C. Since then, only the section of Union Turnpike within Nassau County still carries this numerical designation.

In 2024, the New York City Department of Design and Construction completed a reconstruction of Union Turnpike between Hollis Court Boulevard and 226th Street. The project involved reconstructing the median and concrete bus stop slabs, as well as adding new trees, street lights, and pedestrian signals.

== Major intersections ==
County	Location	mi	km	Destinations	Notes
Queens	Glendale	0.0	0.0	Jackie Robinson Parkway / Myrtle Avenue	Western terminus; exit 5 on Jackie Robinson Parkway
Queens	Glendale	0.3	0.48	Woodhaven Boulevard	
Queens	Kew Gardens (Kew Gardens Interchange)	1.9	3.1	NY 25 (Queens Boulevard)	Interchange; no westbound access to NY 25 east
Queens	Kew Gardens (Kew Gardens Interchange)	2.1	3.4	I-678 north (Van Wyck Expressway) – Whitestone Bridge	Eastbound exit and westbound entrance; exit 8 on I-678
Queens	Kew Gardens (Kew Gardens Interchange)	2.4	3.9	Grand Central Parkway – Eastern Long Island, RFK Bridge	Exits 14-15 on Grand Central Parkway
Queens	Cunningham Park	5.3	8.5	Francis Lewis Boulevard	
Queens	Cunningham Park	5.5	8.9	I-295 (Clearview Expressway) to NY 25 (Hillside Avenue) – Throgs Neck Bridge	Exit 2 on I-295; former I-78
Queens	Hollis Hills	6.6	10.6	Springfield Boulevard	Former NY 25
Queens	Bellerose	6.8	10.9	Grand Central Parkway west – RFK Bridge To Grand Central Parkway east / Cross Island Parkway – Eastern Long Island	Interchange; exit 22 on Grand Central Parkway
Queens	Glen Oaks	7.7	12.4	Cross Island Parkway – Verrazano Bridge, Whitestone Bridge	Exit 28B on Cross Island Parkway
Nassau	North New Hyde Park	9.2	14.8	Lakeville Road	
Nassau	North New Hyde Park	10.0	16.1	Marcus Avenue / New Hyde Park Road	Eastern terminus
1.000 mi = 1.609 km; 1.000 km = 0.621 mi: Incomplete access

== See also ==
- Transportation in New York City
- Transportation on Long Island
