= 2023 Nassau County Legislature election =

2023 Nassau County, New York legislature elections
- November 7, 2023

All 19 seats to the Nassau County Legislature
	Majority party	Minority party
Leader	Howard J. Kopel	Delia DeRiggi-Whitton
Party	Republican	Democratic
Leader since	January 2024	November 2023
Leader's seat	7th district	11th district
Last election	12	7
Seats won	12	7
Seat change	Steady	Steady
Popular vote	143,204	100,720
Percentage	58.55%	41.18%
Swing	▼0.18%	▼0.03%
Republican
50–60%
60–70%
70–80%
Democratic
50–60%
60–70%
70–80%

The 2023 Nassau County Legislature Election was held on November 7, 2023, to elect the 19 legislators in Nassau County, New York, one from each of the county's legislative districts. The elections coincided with other elections to various cities, towns, and villages.

The Republican Party maintained their 12–7 majority from the 2021 election.

== Results summary ==
=== Countywide ===
Nassau County, New York Legislature Election, 2023
Party	Votes	Percentage	Seats	+/–
Republican	143,204	58.55%	12	
Democratic	100,720	41.18%	7	
Write-in	672	0.27%	0	
Totals	244,596	100.00%	19	

County seats
Republican	63.16%
Democratic	36.84%

=== District ===
Results of the 2023 Nassau County Legislature election by district:

District	Republican		Democratic		Others		Total		Result
District	Votes	%	Votes	%	Votes	%	Votes	%	Result
1	4,608	45.24%	5,570	54.69%	7	0.07%	10,185	100.00%	Democratic hold
2	1,679	24.68%	5,108	75.07%	17	0.25%	6,804	100.00%	Democratic hold
3	4,427	42.31%	6,009	57.43%	27	0.26%	10,463	100.00%	Democratic hold
4	9,840	59.72%	6,624	40.20%	14	0.08%	16,478	100.00%	Republican hold
5	5,336	46.81%	6,038	52.96%	26	0.23%	11,400	100.00%	Democratic hold
6	4,084	40.36%	6,015	59.44%	21	0.21%	10,120	100.00%	Democratic gain
7	10,294	78.44%	2,825	21.53%	5	0.04%	13,124	100.00%	Republican hold
8	9,657	73.67%	3,408	26.00%	43	0.33%	13,108	100.00%	Republican hold
9	8,280	64.39%	4,498	34.98%	82	0.64%	12,860	100.00%	Republican hold
10	11,510	59.83%	7,690	39.97%	38	0.20%	19,238	100.00%	Republican hold
11	5,553	35.62%	10,017	64.26%	18	0.12%	15,588	100.00%	Democratic hold
12	10,573	69.89%	4,532	29.96%	22	0.15%	15,127	100.00%	Republican hold
13	7,919	66.25%	3,973	33.24%	61	0.51%	11,953	100.00%	Republican hold
14	7,667	59.54%	5,183	40.25%	27	0.21%	12,877	100.00%	Republican hold
15	8,538	72.73%	3,156	26.88%	46	0.39%	11,740	100.00%	Republican hold
16	5,670	44.61%	6,979	54.91%	62	0.49%	12,711	100.00%	Democratic hold
17	6,936	69.60%	2,965	29.75%	65	0.65%	9,966	100.00%	Republican hold
18	9,459	57.49%	6,908	41.98%	87	0.53%	16,454	100.00%	Republican gain
19	11,174	77.60%	3,222	22.38%	4	0.03%	14,400	100.00%	Republican hold
Total	143,204	58.55%	100,720	41.18%	672	0.27%	244,596	100.00%	
