= 2021 Nassau County Legislature election =

2021 Nassau County, New York legislature elections
- November 2, 2021

All 19 seats to the Nassau County Legislature
	Majority party	Minority party
Party	Republican	Democratic
Last election	11	8
Seats won	12	7
Seat change	▲1	▼1
Popular vote	163,786	114,934
Percentage	58.73%	41.21%
Swing	▲7.95%	▼7.78%
Republican
50–60%
60–70%
70–80%
Democratic
50–60%
60–70%
70–80%
80–90%

The 2021 Nassau County Legislature Election was held on November 2, 2021, to elect the 19 legislators in Nassau County, New York, one from each of the county's legislative districts. The elections coincided with the county executive and district attorney elections well as other elections to various cities, towns, and villages.

The Republican Party gained one seat, increasing their majority from 11–8 to 12–7.

== Results summary ==
=== Countywide ===
Nassau County, New York Legislature Election, 2021
Party	Votes	Percentage	Seats	+/–
Republican	143,447	58.73%	12	▲1
Democratic	109,687	41.21%	7	▼1
Write-in	168	0.06%	0	
Totals	278,888	100.00%	19	

County seats
Republican	63.16%
Democratic	36.84%

=== District ===
Results of the 2021 Nassau County Legislature election by district:

District	Republican		Democratic		Others		Total		Result
District	Votes	%	Votes	%	Votes	%	Votes	%	Result
1	1,373	14.61%	8,026	85.38%	1	0.01%	9,400	100.00%	Democratic hold
2	1,147	16.45%	5,818	83.45%	7	0.10%	6,972	100.00%	Democratic hold
3	2,940	29.40%	7,041	70.42%	18	0.18%	9,999	100.00%	Democratic hold
4	10,940	67.66%	5,220	32.28%	9	0.06%	16,169	100.00%	Republican hold
5	4,921	40.03%	7,348	59.77%	24	0.20%	12,293	100.00%	Democratic hold
6	9,209	58.26%	6,595	41.72%	3	0.02%	15,807	100.00%	Republican hold
7	11,509	67.20%	5,614	32.78%	4	0.02%	17,127	100.00%	Republican hold
8	10,422	70.29%	4,396	29.65%	9	0.06%	14,827	100.00%	Republican hold
9	10,400	69.01%	4,666	30.96%	4	0.03%	15,070	100.00%	Republican hold
10	7,723	53.22%	6,779	46.71%	10	0.07%	14,512	100.00%	Republican gain
11	5,422	35.73%	9,741	64.19%	12	0.08%	15,175	100.00%	Democratic hold
12	14,524	77.05%	4,322	22.93%	5	0.03%	18,851	100.00%	Republican hold
13	11,477	66.20%	5,954	33.76%	7	0.04%	17,638	100.00%	Republican hold
14	11,143	71.38%	4,459	28.57%	8	0.05%	15,610	100.00%	Republican hold
15	10.742	72.39%	4,096	27.60%	2	0.01%	14,840	100.00%	Republican hold
16	7,323	48.61%	7,728	51.29%	15	0.10%	15,066	100.0%	Democratic hold
17	11,672	74.88%	3,912	25.10%	4	0.03%	15,588	100.00%	Republican hold
18	7,515	49.21%	7,736	50.66%	20	0.13%	15,271	100.00%	Democratic hold
19	13,184	70.60%	5,438	29.36%	6	0.03%	18,673	100.00%	Republican hold
Total	163,786	58.73%	114,934	41.21%	168	0.06%	278,888	100.00%	
