= Marcus Avenue =

County highway in Nassau County, New York

- Nassau County Route D46
- Marcus Avenue, highlighted in red

Route information
- Maintained by NCDPW
- Length: 2.2 mi (3.5 km)
- Existed: c. 1910–present

Major junctions
- West end: Queens–Nassau border in Lake Success
- Lakeville Road (CR 11) in Lake Success; New Hyde Park Road (CR 5B) and Union Turnpike in North New Hyde Park; NY 25B (Hillside Avenue) and Denton Avenue in Garden City Park; Nassau Boulevard (CR D66) in Garden City Park
- East end: NY 25 (Jericho Turnpike) and County Courthouse Road in Garden City Park

Location
- Country: United States
- State: New York
- County: Nassau

Highway system
- County routes in New York; County Routes in Nassau County

Marcus Avenue is a major roadway in Nassau County, on Long Island, New York, United States. It runs from the Queens–Nassau border in Lake Success at its western end, to Garden City Park at its eastern end. It is maintained by the Nassau County Department of Public Works and is designated as the unsigned Nassau County Route D46.

On the Queens side of the New York City line, Marcus Avenue becomes known as the Grand Central Parkway Service Road, and continues west to Little Neck Parkway and Commonwealth Boulevard in Glen Oaks; the Grand Central Parkway Service Road is owned and maintained by the New York City Department of Transportation.

The road is best known for being the former address for the temporary headquarters of the United Nations between 1947 and 1952.

== Route description ==
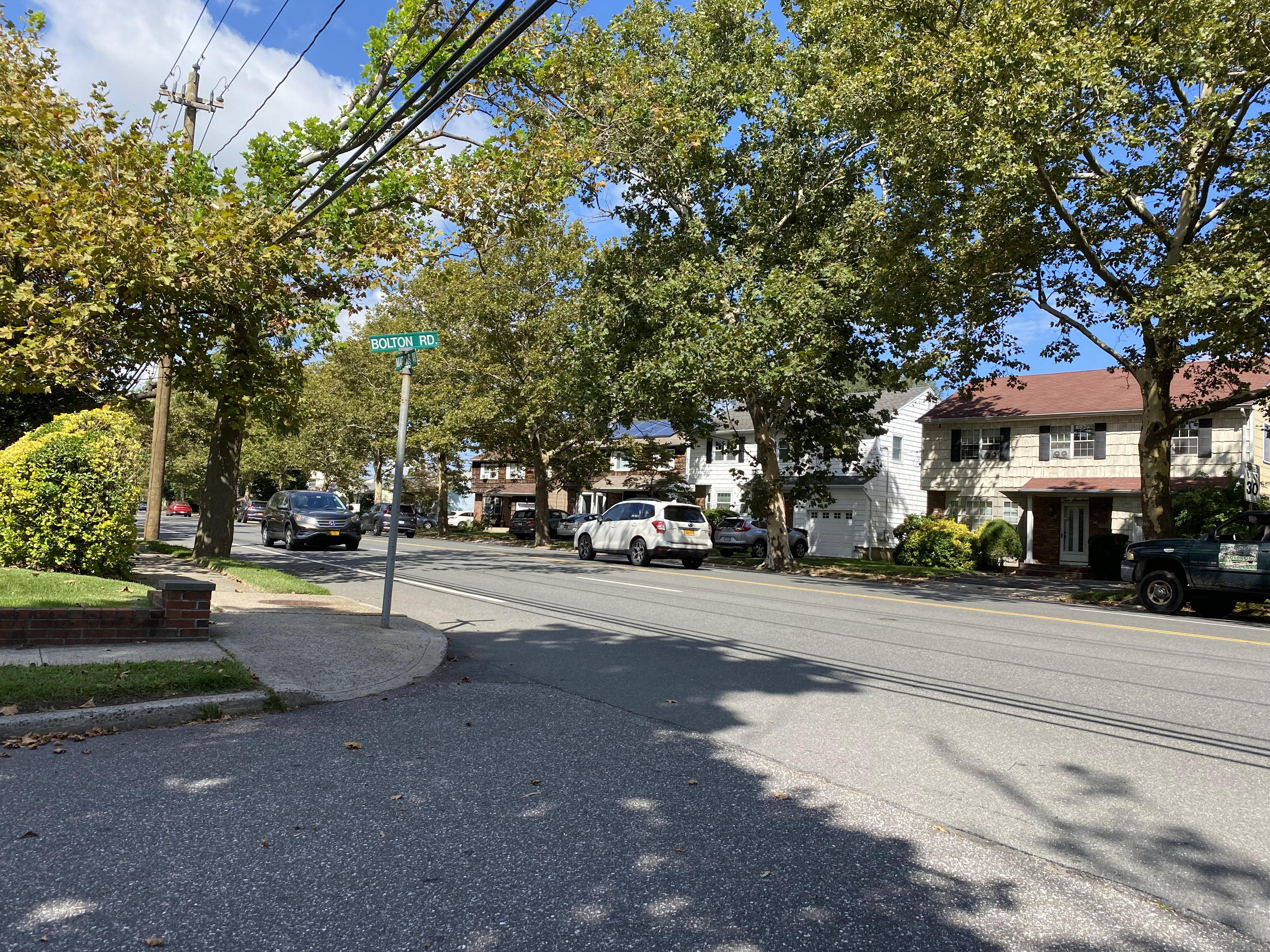
Marcus Avenue, as seen from Bolton Road in Garden City Park in 2021.

Marcus Avenue begins adjacent to the North Shore Towers and Grand Central/Northern State Parkways at the Queens–Nassau border, in Lake Success, as the eastern continuation of the Grand Central Parkway Service Road. From there, it parallels the south side of the Northern State Parkway to an intersection with Lakeville Road (CR 11) and eastbound Exit 25 on the parkway, before curving southeast, eventually reaching the Lake Success–North New Hyde Park border, where the road's mileage scheme resets. It then reaches North New Hyde Park Road (CR 5B) a short distance later, thence merging into Union Turnpike immediately thereafter, next to Clinton G. Martin Park.

East of the junction with Union Turnpike, Marcus Avenue forms the Manhasset Hills–North New Hyde Park border and continues east before curving southeast, thence veering south and eventually intersecting Hillside Avenue (NY 25) at the Garden City Park–Manhasset Hills–North New Hyde Park tripoint. Marcus Avenue then reaches a junction with Denton Avenue (CR C58) immediately thereafter and veers back to the southeast. From there, Marcus Avenue continues southeast, eventually intersecting Nassau Boulevard (CR D66), and then reaching its eastern terminus at the intersection of Jericho Turnpike (NY 25) and County Courthouse Road soon thereafter in Garden City Park.

== History ==
Marcus Avenue was originally constructed around 1910. The road is named for the Hon. Marcus Christ – the son of then-North Hempstead Town Supervisor Philip Christ; Marcus Christ would eventually serve as the Presiding Justice of the New York Supreme Court, Appellate Division's Second Judicial Department. The name was suggested to Christ by the highway superintendent while Christ was doing a site inspection.

Between 1947 and 1952, the United Nations used the Sperry Gyroscope Company's building on Marcus Avenue, in Lake Success, as its temporary headquarters while the permanent one in Manhattan was being built.

In the 1970s, a controversy arose regarding the road when the North Shore Towers were being built. New York City's planners proposed making the Queens continuation of Marcus Avenue one-way from Little Neck Parkway to the city line one-way eastbound, and for that pattern to continue into Nassau County, along Marcus Avenue, to Lakeville Road; Marcus Avenue would be the only road with access to the development, which planners estimated would lead to daily traffic on the road increasing by roughly 3,000 vehicles. This plan received heavy condemnation from Lake Success and Nassau County officials, who argued such an alteration of the road – especially on the Nassau County section – would be detrimental. Queens Borough President Donald Manes and Nassau County Executive Ralph G. Caso reached an agreement in May 1974: New York City would keep their portion a two-way street, while Nassau County would allow the Q44A bus to enter Nassau County to serve Long Island Jewish Medical Center, via Marcus Avenue and Lakeville Road in Lake Success; Caso had previously met with New York City Mayor Abraham Beame regarding the inter-municipal fight. Shortly after New York City agreed to keep their section of the road two-lane thoroughfare, city officials reversed course on October 21 of that year, and announced their renewed intention to make their section one-way eastbound. This decision led to Nassau County and North Hempstead officials – including Caso and then-North Hempstead Town Supervisor Michael J. Tully, Jr. – retaliating by threatening to erect a road barricade at the Queens–Nassau border and make the Nassau County side of Marcus Avenue one-way westbound west of Lakeville Road. The dispute was eventually resolved, and the road remains a two-way thoroughfare.

In 1981, Nassau County installed a concrete median along Marcus Avenue in Garden City Park, in the vicinity of Laurel Drive.

The former route shield for CR 25C.

Like all of the other county routes in Nassau County, CR D46 became unsigned in the 1970s, when Nassau County officials opted to remove the signs as opposed to allocating the funds for replacing them with new ones that met the latest federal design standards and requirements, as per the federal government's Manual on Uniform Traffic Control Devices. Furthermore, CR D46 was formerly designated as part of CR 25C, prior to the route numbers in Nassau County being altered.

== Major intersections ==
Location	mi	km	Destinations	Notes
Queens–Lake Success line	0.00	0.00	North Shore Towers Boulevard	Western terminus of CR D46 and Nassau County ownership; continues west as NYCDOT-maintained Grand Central Parkway Service Road to Little Neck Parkway and its western end at Commonwealth Boulevard
Lake Success	0.43	0.69	Lakeville Road (CR 11)	To Northern State Parkway west – New York, via Lakeville Road; access to Long Island Jewish Medical Center, via Lakeville Road
Lake Success	0.63	1.01	Northern State Parkway east – Hauppauge	Exit 25 on the Northern State Parkway; access to/from eastbound Northern State Parkway only
Lake Success	0.97	1.56	Nevada Drive	
Lake Success–North New Hyde Park line	1.09 0.00	1.75 0.00	Ohio Drive	Mileage scheme resets at this location
Manhasset Hills–North New Hyde Park line	0.23	0.37	New Hyde Park Road and Union Turnpike	Access to Clinton G. Martin Park
Manhasset Hills–North New Hyde Park line	0.92	1.48	Laurel Lane	
Garden City Park–Manhasset Hills– North New Hyde Park tripoint	0.92– 1.21	1.48– 1.95	NY 25B (Hillside Avenue) and Denton Avenue	Marcus and Denton Avenues are concurrent through this junction
Garden City Park	1.66	2.67	Nassau Boulevard (CR D66)	
Garden City Park	2.09	3.36	NY 25 (Jericho Turnpike) and County Courthouse Road	Eastern terminus of Marcus Avenue and the CR D46 route designation
1.000 mi = 1.609 km; 1.000 km = 0.621 mi: Concurrency terminus; Incomplete access; Route transition

== See also ==
- List of county routes in Nassau County, New York
