= 2026 Nassau County, New York Legislature election =

- November 3, 2026

All 19 seats to the Nassau County Legislature

	Majority party	Minority party
Leader	Howard Kopel	Delia DeRiggi-Whitton
Party	Republican	Democratic
Leader's seat	District 7	District 11
Seats before	11	8
Seats after	10	9
Seat change	▼1	▲1
Presiding Officer before election
Howard Kopel
Republican
Elected Presiding Officer
TBD

The 2026 Nassau County Legislature elections were held on November 3, 2026, coinciding with the 2026 midterms and other statewide and local races. All 19 legislators were up for election to a 2-year term. The republicans maintained their majority despite the democrats having a majority in the countywide vote.

== Results ==
Prior to the election the New York Court of Appeals upheld a state law requiring most municipal elections to happen on even numbered years. As a result of the ruling current legislators had their terms shortened to one year and had to face another election for a full two-year term.

=== Countywide ===
2026 Nassau County, New York Legislature election
Party	Votes	Percentage	Seats	+/-
Republican	259,801	49.74%	10	0
Democratic	262,172	50.20%	8	0
Write In/Other	319	0.06%	0	

=== By District ===
District	Republican	Democratic	Others	Result
1	7,334(28.39%)	18,482(71.55%)	14(0.05%)	Democratic Hold
2	5,057(27.66%)	13,215(72.28%)	11(0.06%)	Democratic Hold
3	6,802(26.51%)	18,830(73.40%)	23(0.09%)	Democratic Hold
4	16,394(54.50%)	13,670(45.45%)	15(0.05%)	Republican Hold
5	6,181(31.06%)	13,708(68.89%)	9(0.05%)	Democratic Hold
6	6,679(28.00%)	17,164(71.95%)	11(0.05%)	Democratic Hold
7	18,515(70.90%)	7,584(29.04%)	16(0.06%)	Republican Hold
8	18,344(61.35%)	11,536(38.58%)	19(0.06%)	Republican Hold
9	13,763(49.96%)	13,764(49.96%)	21(0.08%)	Democratic Lead(Possible flip)
10	16,932(61.09%)	10,767(38.85%)	17(0.06%)	Republican Hold
11	10,699(38.82%)	16,841(61.10%)	21(0.08%)	Democratic Hold
12	17,915(55.71%)	14,229(44.25%)	12(0.04%)	Republican Hold
13	15,333(53.86%)	13,123(46.10%)	13(0.05%)	Republican Hold
14	9,219(34.19%)	17,730(65.76%)	12(0.05%)	Democratic Hold
15	20,841(64.87%)	11,277(35.10%)	11(0.03%)	Republican Hold
16	12,797(44.90%)	15,684(55.03%)	22(0.08%)	Democratic Hold
17	16,409(58.77%)	12,797(44.90%)	23(0.08%)	Republican Hold
18	16,933(59.78%)	11,358(40.10%)	33(0.12%)	Republican Hold
19	23,654(69.40%)	10,413(30.55%)	16(0.05%)	Republican Hold
