= Great Neck Village High School =

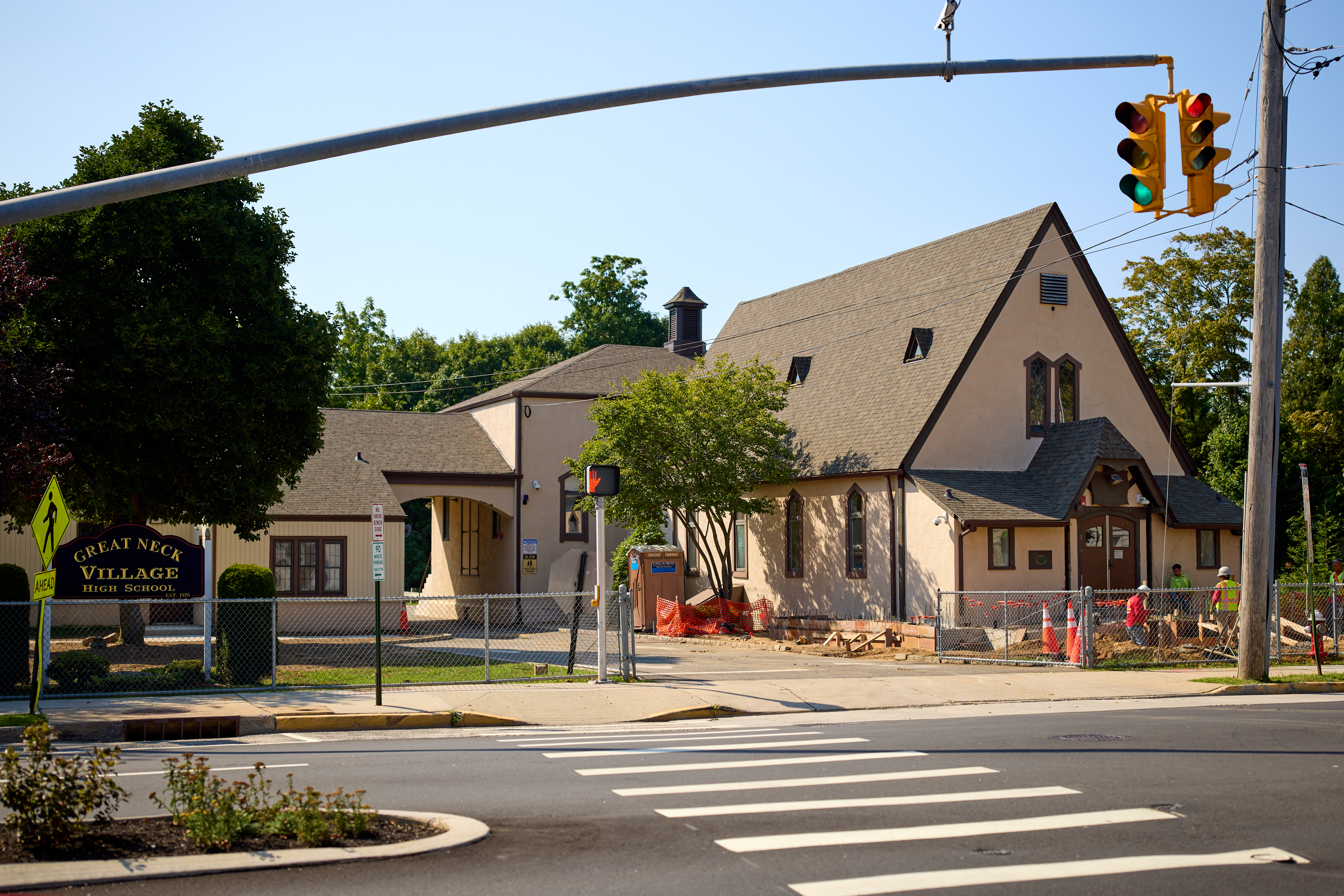
- The Village School in 2022

Location
- 614 Middle Neck Road; Great Neck, New York 11023; United States; 40°48′11″N 73°44′11″W

Information
- Established: 1971
- Principal: Lauren Sullivan
- Faculty: 8.0
- Enrollment: 52 (2024-2025)
- Student to teacher ratio: 1:7
- Website: vs.greatneck.k12.ny.us

Great Neck Village High School – also known as Village School or simply VS – is a public alternative high school serving students in grades 8 through 12, located in the Village of Great Neck, in Nassau County, New York, United States.

A member of Coalition of Essential Schools, Village High School is one of three high schools operated by the Great Neck Union Free School District.

== Description ==
The Village School offers its 52 students an outdoor education program, college preparatory program, and inclusion of students with disabilities.

Co-founder Arnie Langberg has been called "one of the most important pioneers in the field of public alternative education."

Village School is home to the newspaper 'The Villager.

As of the 2014-15 school year, the school had an enrollment of 48 students and 6.0 classroom teachers (on an FTE basis), for a student–teacher ratio of 8.0:1. There were 3 students (6.3% of enrollment) eligible for free lunch and none eligible for reduced-cost lunch.

As of the 2024-25 school year, the school had an enrollment of 52 students and 8.0 classroom teachers, for a student teacher ratio of 7:1.

== Students ==
Students who enroll must be considered at risk academically for an array of reasons. The students must be in danger of getting lost in Great Neck’s two large, comprehensive high schools or becoming overwhelmed by their environments. Students may have social and emotional problems. The students may also face anxiety and difficulties with focus and organization. In the Village School’s low-key approach, these issues can be dealt with easily. Students who may have felt lost and isolated in a large school often thrive in the smaller and more personalized setting of the Village School. In the 2010-2011 school year, 39 students attended Village School. However, Village School can enroll up to 50 students. About fifty percent of students qualify for special education.

=== Demographics ===
The student body in the school year of 2010-2011 consists of:

- 0 American Indian or Alaska Native students or 0% of the student body
- 2 Black or African American students or 5% of the student body
- 4 Hispanic or Latino students or 10% of the student body
- 5 Asian or Native Hawaiian/Other Pacific Islander students or 13% of the student body
- 28 White students or 72% of the student body
- 0 Multiracial students or 0% of the student body

== Notable alumni ==
- Nikki Blonsky, actress; transferred to the school in her sophomore year

== See also ==
- John L. Miller Great Neck North High School
- William A. Shine Great Neck South High School
