= Lake Success (lake) =

Kettle lake in the Village of Lake Success, New York, United States

Coordinates: 40°45′50″N 73°42′30″W

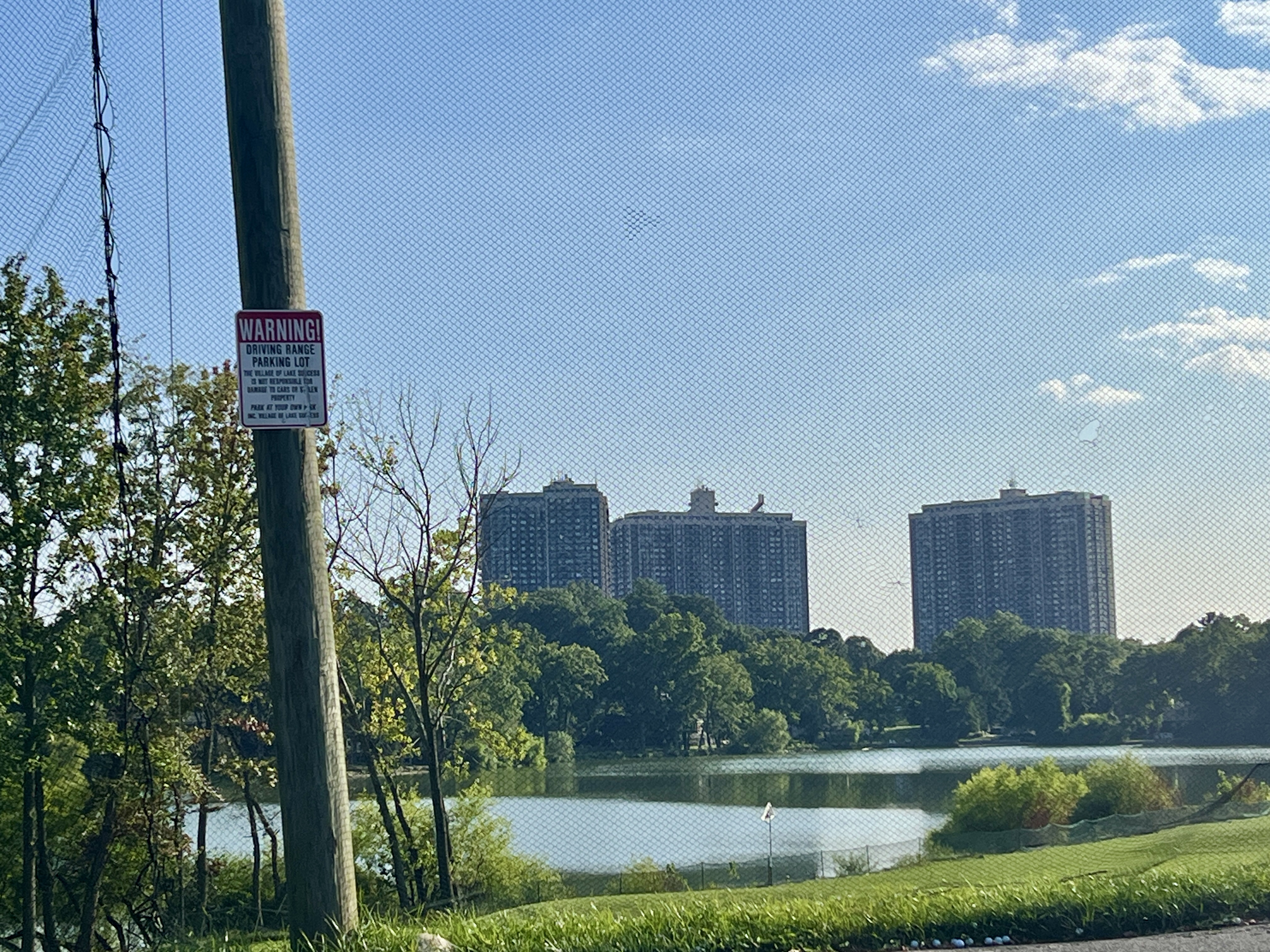
- Lake Success, as viewed from the Lake Success Village Hall & Golf Club in 2024

- Location within the United States
- Location: Lake Success, New York
- Type: Kettle lake
- Managing agency: Town of North Hempstead
- Max. depth: 75 ft (23 m)

Lake Success is a kettle lake in Lake Success, in Nassau County, on Long Island, in New York, United States.

== Description ==
Lake Success was formed during the last ice age. The name of the lake is believed to be derived from the Native American chief "Sacut."

The center of Lake Success is approximately 75 feet (23 m) deep.

Lake Success is the source of the name of the village it is located in: Lake Success, New York. Prior to that village's incorporation in 1927, the area had previously been known as Lakeville – also referencing the lake's presence within the community.

The lake marks the location where the Harbor Hill Moraine and the Ronkonkoma Moraine meet one another. West of Lake Success, the younger Harbor Hill Moraine overrode the older Ronkonkoma Moraine.

In January 2020, Lake Success earned local fame when resident Gabe Ragusa swam across the lake in its entirety without reportedly taking a breath. This feat was corroborated by Newsday. When the challenge was completed, Ragusa famously remarked "that was a success!"

Lake Success is owned by the Town of North Hempstead.

== See also ==
- Lake Ronkonkoma – Another kettle lake on Long Island, located in neighboring Suffolk County.
- Leeds Pond – Another body of water owned by the Town of North Hempstead, located in Plandome Manor.
