= Lake Success, New York =

- Village
- Incorporated Village of Lake Success
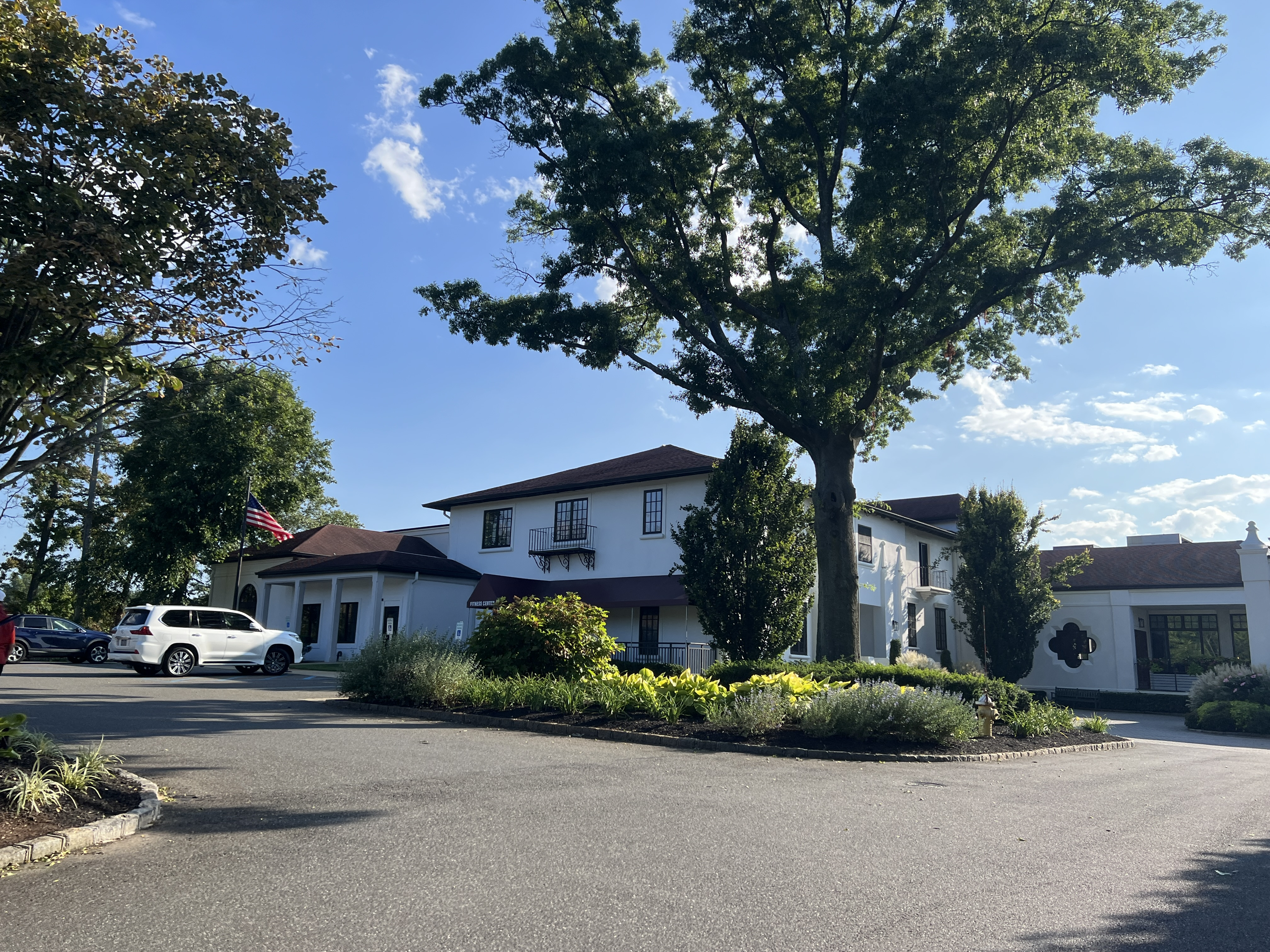
- Lake Success Village Hall & Clubhouse in 2024

- Location in Nassau County and the state of New York.

- Location on Long Island Location within the state of New York
- Coordinates: 40°46′13″N 73°42′48″W
- Country: United States
- State: New York
- County: Nassau
- Town: North Hempstead
- First settled: 1783
- Incorporated: December 1927
- Named for: Lake Success

Government
  - Mayor: Adam Hoffman
  - Deputy Mayor: Gene Kaplan
  - Trustees: List of Trustees: • Spyro Dimitratos; • Lawrence W. Farkas; • Robert Gal; • Fred Handsman; • Marian Lee

Area
  - Total: 1.90 sq mi (4.92 km^{2})
  - Land: 1.85 sq mi (4.79 km^{2})
  - Water: 0.050 sq mi (0.13 km^{2})
- Elevation: 203 ft (62 m)

Population (2020)
  - Total: 2,828
  - Density: 1,528.2/sq mi (590.06/km^{2})
- Time zone: UTC-5 (Eastern (EST))
  - Summer (DST): UTC-4 (EDT)
- ZIP Codes: 11020 (Lake Success); 11021 (Great Neck); 11042 (New Hyde Park)
- Area codes: 516, 363
- FIPS code: 36-40937
- GNIS feature ID: 0954942
- Website: www.lakesuccessny.gov

Lake Success is a village located within the Town of North Hempstead in Nassau County, on the North Shore of Long Island, in New York, United States. The population was 2,828 at the time of the 2020 census.

In the 1940s and early 1950s, the Incorporated Village of Lake Success served as the temporary home of the United Nations, which occupied the headquarters of the Sperry Gyroscope Company on Marcus Avenue.

== History ==
What is now the Village of Lake Success was first settled by Europeans in 1783, and the community became known as Lakeville. This name was widely used to describe the area until circa 1927, about the time the Village of Lake Success incorporated as a village.

In the early 20th century, William K. Vanderbilt II bought land around the Lake Success kettle lake for a home.

In 1939, the United States government bought a large tract between Marcus Avenue, Lakeville Road, and Union Turnpike, to be the home to the Sperry Gyroscope Company, which built a variety of maritime, military, aerospace, and navigation products. During World War II, the plant had 22,000 employees. After the war, part of the plant became the temporary headquarters of the United Nations from 1947 to 1952, while its headquarters building in New York City was being built. The 1,500,000-square-foot (140,000 m^{2}) facility continued to be used by various companies (including Unisys and Loral Corporation) to build military products over ensuing decades. It was purchased by Lockheed Martin in 1996. The company closed the plant in 1998 and began an environmental clean-up of the site overseen by the New York State Department of Environmental Conservation. The building became I-Park, and a few technical companies moved it – but, much of the space was unused. In 2005, Northwell Health leased 454,000 square feet of the 1.4-million-square-foot former defense plant, and is valued at approximately $300 million, and comes with an option to buy.

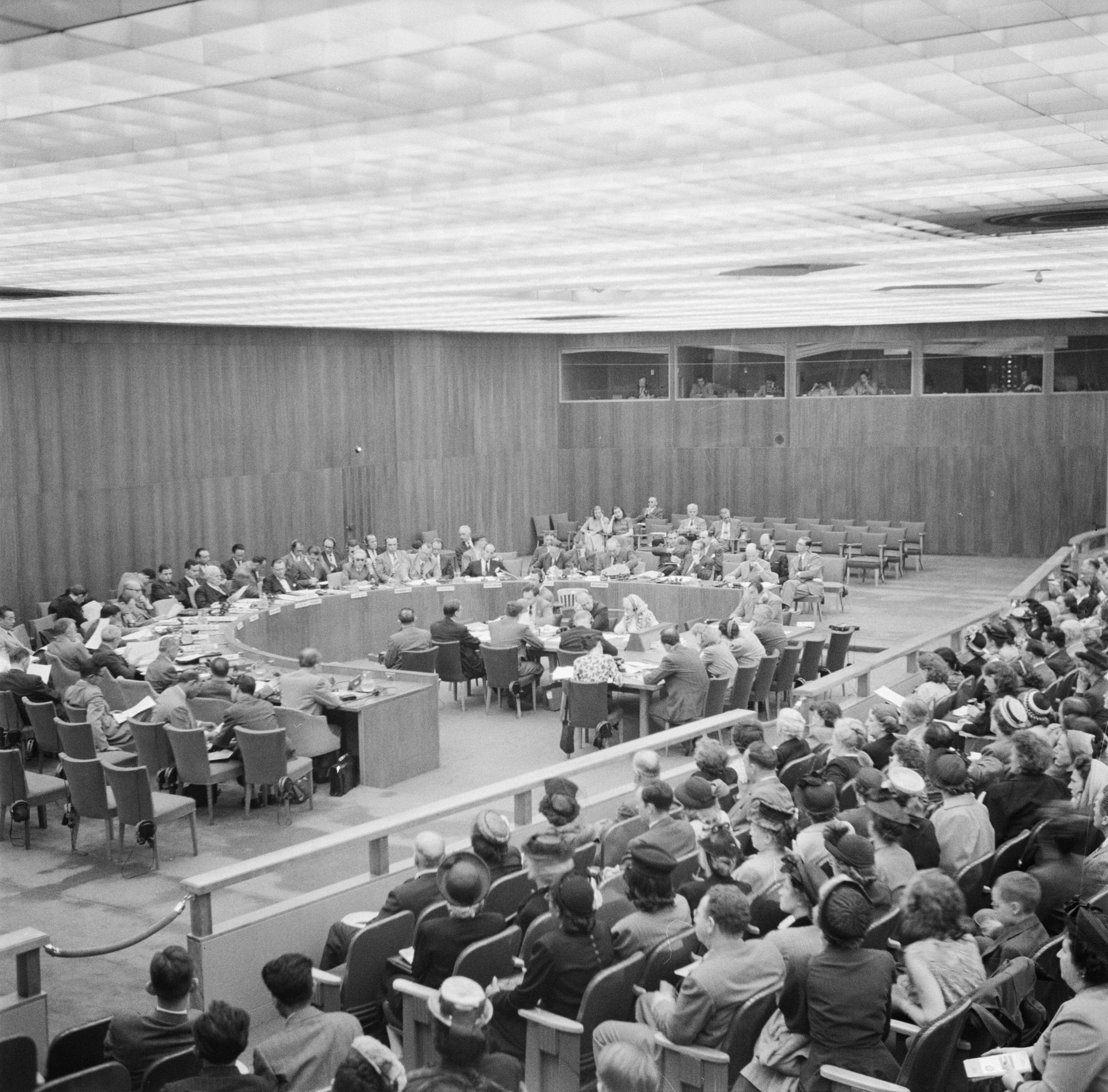
UN session in the village in June 1948

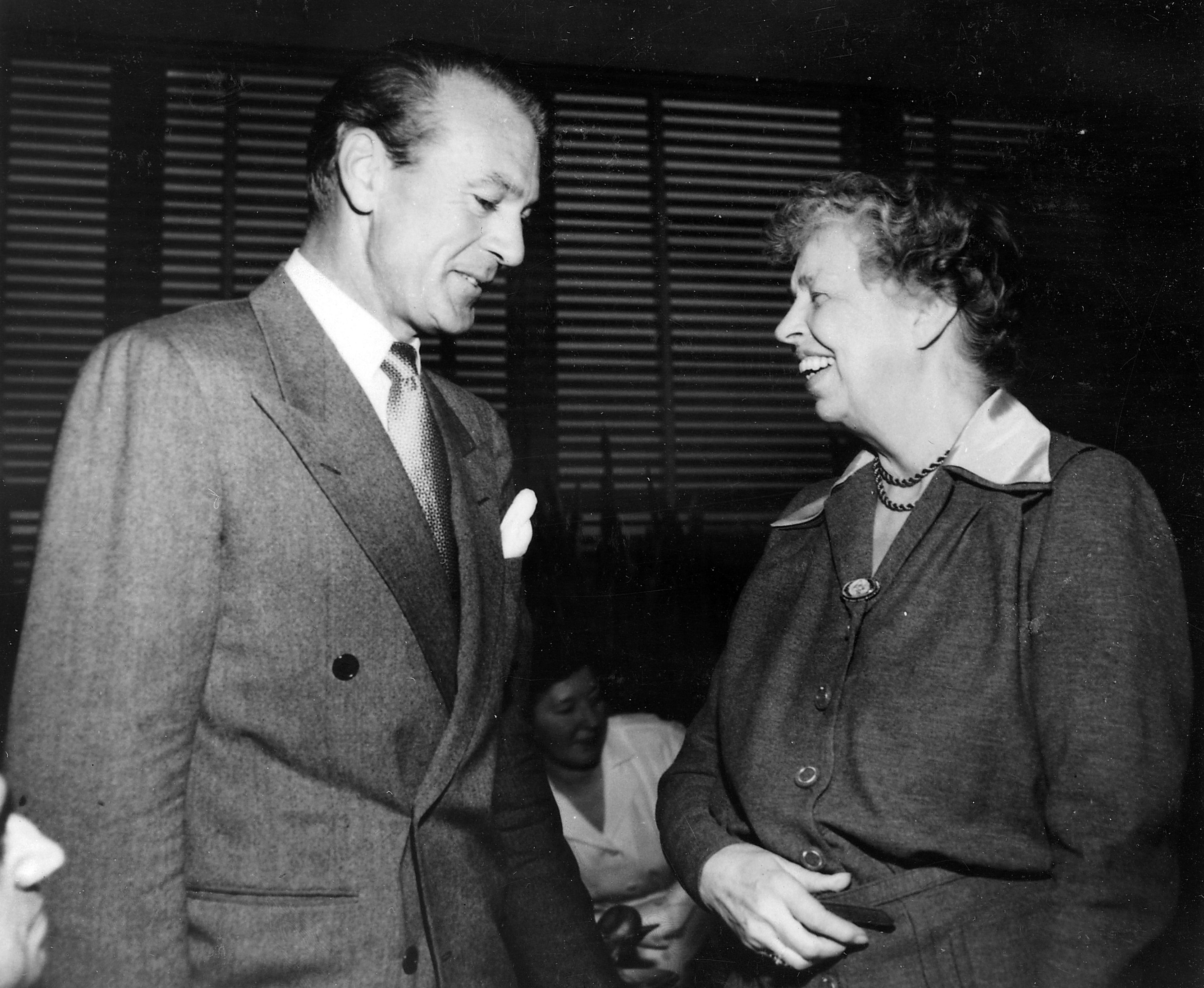
Gary Cooper and Eleanor Roosevelt at the temporary UN headquarters in Lake Success, 1950

On December 15, 1954, the village's Board of Trustees approved a plan to construct the Lake Success Village Pool. A few weeks later, on January 12, 1955, village residents approved a $125,000 (1955 USD) bond to construct the facility.

In 2023, Hain Celestial Group, which had been headquartered in Lake Success for roughly a decade, moved to a new location outside of the village. The space was subsequently purchased by Northwell Health.

=== Etymology ===
The Village of Lake Success derives its name from a kettle lake of the same name which, according to village lore, had a Native American name of "Sucut."

== Geography ==
According to the United States Census Bureau, the village has a total area of 1.9 square miles (4.9 km^{2}), of which 1.9 square miles (4.9 km^{2}) is land and 0.04 square miles (0.10 km^{2}), or 2.08%, is water.

The village borders the Little Neck neighborhood in the New York City borough of Queens – as well as the Nassau County communities of Manhasset, Manhasset Hills, North Hills, North New Hyde Park, Thomaston, and University Gardens.

=== Drainage ===
Lake Success is split between three minor drainage areas: Alley Creek (part of the Little Neck Bay Watershed), Hook Creek/Head of Harbor, and Manhasset Bay, and is located within the larger Long Island Sound/Atlantic Ocean Watershed.

=== Topography ===
According to the United States Environmental Protection Agency and the United States Geological Survey, the highest point in Lake Success is located at Great Neck South High School, at 259 feet (79 m), and the lowest point is located near Community Drive, which is between 40–50 feet (12–15 m).

=== Climate ===
According to the Köppen climate classification, Lake Success has a Humid subtropical climate (type Cfa) with cool, wet winters and hot, humid summers. Precipitation is uniform throughout the year, with slight spring and fall peaks.

Climate data for Lake Success, New York, 1991–2020 normals, extremes 1999–present
Month	Jan	Feb	Mar	Apr	May	Jun	Jul	Aug	Sep	Oct	Nov	Dec	Year
Record high °F (°C)	71 (22)	73 (23)	85 (29)	94 (34)	97 (36)	103 (39)	105 (41)	104 (40)	100 (38)	90 (32)	83 (28)	76 (24)	105 (41)
Mean daily maximum °F (°C)	39 (4)	43 (6)	50 (10)	61 (16)	70 (21)	80 (27)	85 (29)	83 (28)	76 (24)	65 (18)	55 (13)	45 (7)	63 (17)
Mean daily minimum °F (°C)	26 (−3)	28 (−2)	34 (1)	42 (6)	51 (11)	61 (16)	66 (19)	65 (18)	58 (14)	48 (9)	40 (4)	31 (−1)	46 (8)
Record low °F (°C)	−10 (−23)	−7 (−22)	3 (−16)	13 (−11)	32 (0)	43 (6)	50 (10)	48 (9)	38 (3)	27 (−3)	10 (−12)	−1 (−18)	−10 (−23)
Average precipitation inches (mm)	3.62 (92)	3.17 (81)	4.35 (110)	4.15 (105)	3.90 (99)	3.85 (98)	4.40 (112)	3.72 (94)	3.91 (99)	4.08 (104)	3.73 (95)	3.82 (97)	46.7 (1,186)
Source: The Weather Channel

==== Plant zone ====
According to the United States Department of Agriculture (USDA), Lake Success is located within hardiness zone 7b.

== Demographics ==
Historical population
Census	Pop.	Note	%±
1930	295		—
1940	203		−31.2%
1950	1,264		522.7%
1960	2,954		133.7%
1970	3,254		10.2%
1980	2,396		−26.4%
1990	2,484		3.7%
2000	2,797		12.6%
2010	2,934		4.9%
2020	2,828		−3.6%
U.S. Decennial Census

=== Racial and ethnic composition ===
Lake Success village, New York – Racial and ethnic composition Note: the US Census treats Hispanic/Latino as an ethnic category. This table excludes Latinos from the racial categories and assigns them to a separate category. Hispanics/Latinos may be of any race.
Race / Ethnicity (NH = Non-Hispanic)	Pop 2000	Pop 2010	Pop 2020	% 2000	% 2010	% 2020
White alone (NH)	2,179	1,920	1,039	77.90%	65.44%	36.74%
Black or African American alone (NH)	131	96	12	4.68%	3.27%	0.42%
Native American or Alaska Native alone (NH)	0	2	1	0.00%	0.07%	0.04%
Asian alone (NH)	424	791	1,587	15.16%	26.96%	56.12%
Native Hawaiian or Pacific Islander alone (NH)	1	0	0	0.04%	0.00%	0.00%
Other race alone (NH)	6	12	19	0.21%	0.41%	0.67%
Mixed race or Multiracial (NH)	23	32	67	0.82%	1.09%	2.37%
Hispanic or Latino (any race)	33	81	103	1.18%	2.76%	3.64%
Total	2,797	2,934	2,828	100.00%	100.00%	100.00%

=== 2020 census ===
As of the 2020 census, Lake Success had a population of 2,828. The median age was 45.8 years. 24.9% of residents were under the age of 18 and 21.4% were 65 years of age or older. For every 100 females there were 91.2 males, and for every 100 females age 18 and over there were 85.3 males.

100.0% of residents lived in urban areas, while 0.0% lived in rural areas.

There were 820 households in the village, of which 47.2% had individuals under the age of 18 living in them. Of all households, 75.4% were married-couple households, 6.1% had a male householder with no spouse or partner present, and 16.1% had a female householder with no spouse or partner present. About 9.2% of all households were made up of individuals, and 7.0% had someone living alone who was 65 years of age or older.

There were 858 housing units, of which 4.4% were vacant. The homeowner vacancy rate was 0.9% and the rental vacancy rate was 0.0%.

=== 2010 census ===
As of the 2010 United States census, there were 2,897 people, 789 households, and 734 families in the village. The racial makeup was 75.3% White, 5.4% African American, 0.0% Native American, 19.3% Asian, 0.0% Native Hawaiian and Other Pacific Islander, 0.2% from other races, and 0.8% from two or more races. Hispanic or Latino of any race were 1.6% of the population.

=== 2000 census ===
As of 2000 census, there were 2,797 people, 798 households, and 683 families residing in the village. The population density was 1,487.3 inhabitants per square mile (574.2/km^{2}). There were 824 housing units at an average density of 438.2 per square mile (169.2/km^{2}). The racial makeup of the village was 78.94% White, 4.76% African American, 15.16% Asian, 0.04% Pacific Islander, 0.25% from other races, and 0.86% from two or more races. Hispanic or Latino of any race were 1.18% of the population.

There were 798 households, out of which 35.3% had children under the age of 18 living with them, 77.9% were married couples living together, 5.4% had a female householder with no husband present, and 14.4% were non-families. 12.4% of all households were made up of individuals, and 9.9% had someone living alone who was 65 years of age or older. The average household size was 2.86 and the average family size was 3.11.

In the village, the population was spread out, with 20.1% under the age of 18, 4.1% from 18 to 24, 15.8% from 25 to 44, 24.3% from 45 to 64, and 35.8% who were 65 years of age or older. The median age was 52 years. For every 100 females, there were 80.1 males. For every 100 females age 18 and over, there were 73.1 males.

The median income for a household in the village was $134,383, and the median income for a family was $145,562. Males had a median income of $100,000 versus $46,923 for females. The per capita income for the village was $58,002. About 1.4% of families and 1.9% of the population were below the poverty line, including 1.6% of those under age 18 and 3.2% of those age 65 or over.

== Economy ==
Several companies have offices within Lake Success, including Broadridge Financial Solutions, which has its headquarters located within the village.

Additionally, Lake Success served as the home of Canon USA's corporate headquarters until relocating to Melville in neighboring Suffolk County in the early 2010s.

== Government ==
=== Village government ===
The Village of Lake Success is governed by the seven-member Village of Lake Success Board of Trustees, consisting of an elected mayor and six elected trustees; one trustee is selected each year to additionally serve as the deputy mayor. All seven members of the Board of Trustees are elected at-large.

As of May 2026, the Mayor of Lake Success is Adam C. Hoffman.

=== Representation in higher government ===
==== Town representation ====
Lake Success is located in the Town of North Hempstead's 4th council district, which as of May 2026 is represented on the North Hempstead Town Council by Christine Liu (D–Herricks).

==== Nassau County representation ====
Lake Success is located in Nassau County's 10th Legislative district, which as of May 2026 is represented in the Nassau County Legislature by Mazi Melesa Pilip (R–Great Neck).

==== New York State representation ====
===== New York State Assembly =====
Lake Success is located in the New York State Assembly's 16th State Assembly district, which as of May 2026 is represented by Daniel J. Norber (R–Great Neck).

===== New York State Senate =====
Lake Success is located in the New York State Senate's 7th State Senate district, which as of May 2026 is represented by Jack M. Martins (R–Old Westbury).

==== Federal representation ====
===== United States Congress =====
Lake Success is located entirely within New York's 3rd congressional district, which as of May 2026 is represented in the United States Congress by Thomas R. Suozzi (D–Glen Cove).

===== United States Senate =====
Like the rest of New York, Lake Success is represented in the United States Senate by Charles E. Schumer (D) and Kirsten E. Gillibrand (D).

=== Politics ===
In the 2024 U.S. presidential election, the majority of Lake Success's voters voted for Kamala D. Harris (D).

== Education ==
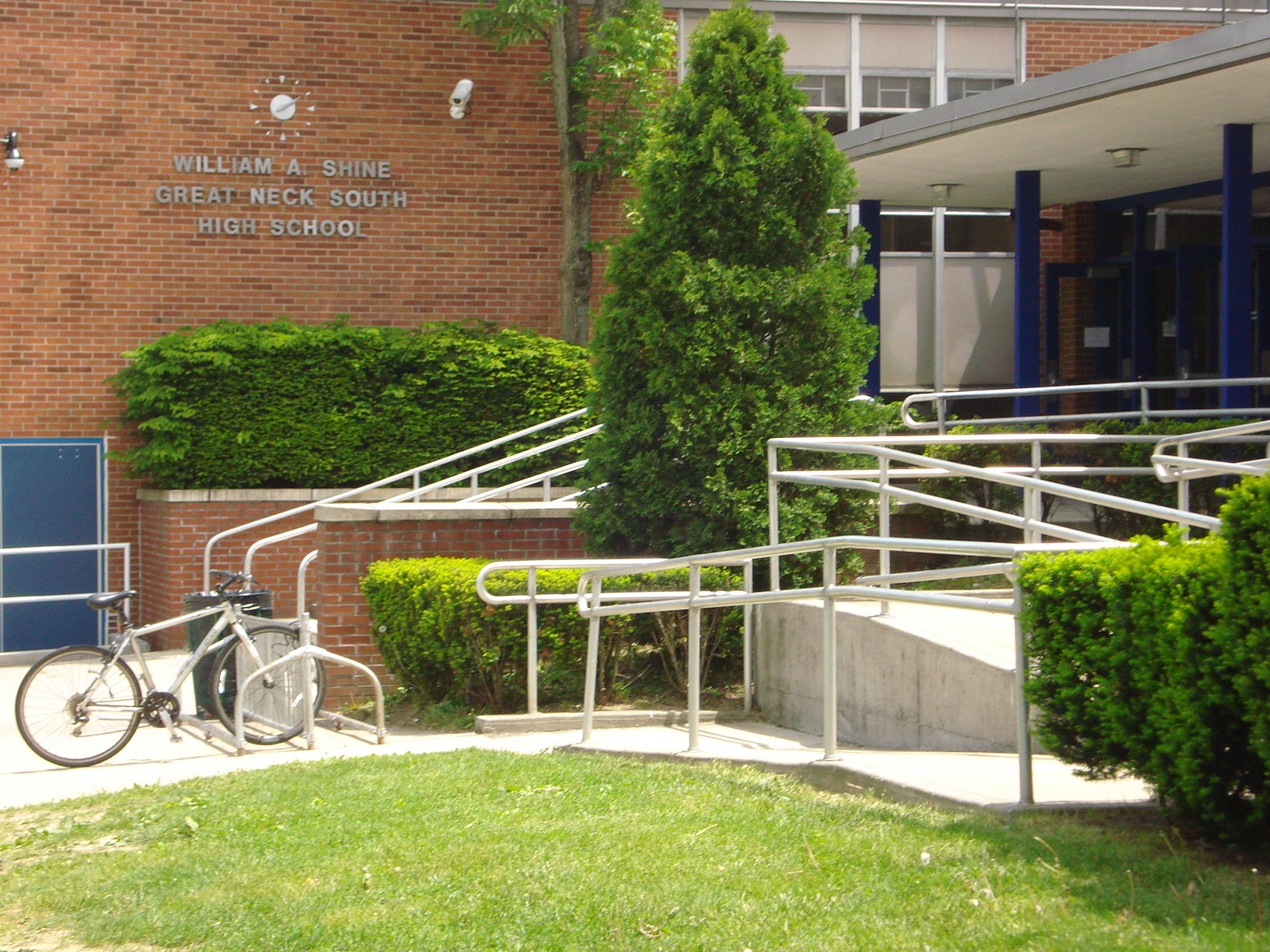
The main entrance to Great Neck South High School in 2009

The heavy majority of the Village of Lake Success is located within the Great Neck Union Free School District. A small part of the village's northeastern corner, meanwhile, is located within the Manhasset Union Free School District. However, all homes in Lake Success are in the portion of the village zoned for Great Neck's schools, and accordingly, all children who reside within Lake Success and attend public schools go to Great Neck's schools.

Furthermore, the Great Neck UFSD's Lakeville Elementary School, Great Neck South Middle School, and Great Neck South High School are all located within the village – along with its administrative offices.

== Media ==
Lake Success is the city of license for hot adult contemporary radio station WKTU, although the station is based in Manhattan along with other iHeartMedia stations.

== Infrastructure ==
=== Transportation ===
==== Road ====
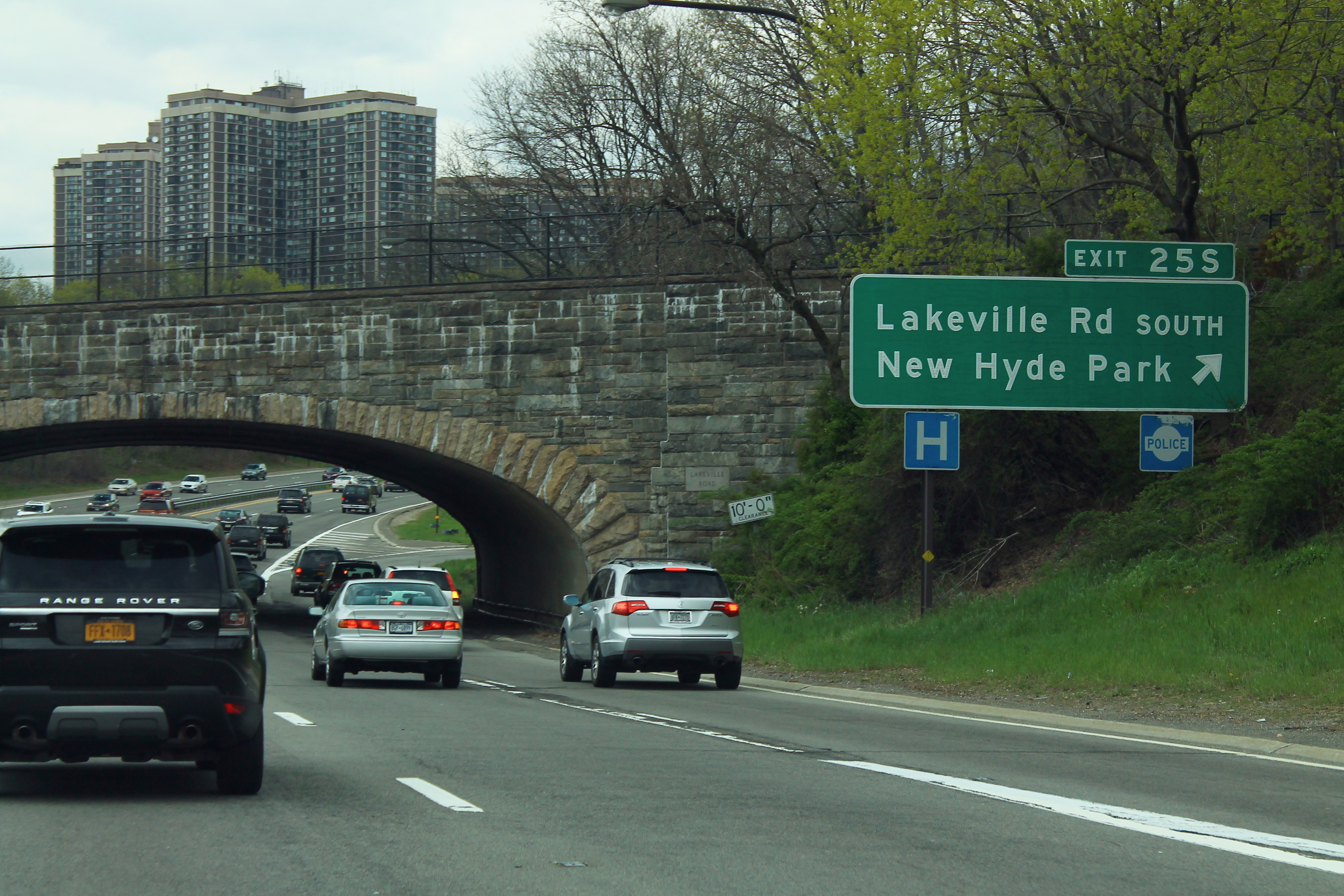
The Northern State Parkway within Lake Success in 2014

The Long Island Expressway (Interstate 495) and the Northern State Parkway pass through Lake Success. Other major roads within the village include Northern Boulevard (NY 25A), Community Drive (CR 11A), Lakeville Road (CR 11), and Marcus Avenue (CR D46).

Additionally, the former Long Island Motor Parkway passed through the village.

==== Rail ====
There are no Long Island Rail Road stations within Lake Success. The nearest stations to the village are Great Neck station and Little Neck station on the Port Washington Branch, as well as New Hyde Park station on the Main Line.

==== Bus ====
The n20G, n20H, n20X, n21, n25, and n26 bus routes run through Lake Success. All of these bus routes are operated by Nassau Inter-County Express (NICE).

=== Utilities ===
==== Natural gas ====
National Grid USA provides natural gas to all properties within Lake Success that are hooked up to natural gas lines.

==== Power ====
PSEG Long Island provides power to all homes and businesses within Lake Success, on behalf of the Long Island Power Authority.

==== Sewage ====
Lake Success is sewered. The southern part of Lake Success is within the Nassau County Sewage District. The remainder of the village is connected to the village's own sanitary sewer network, which flows into the sanitary sewer network operated – and is treated under contract – by the Belgrave Sewer District.

==== Water ====
Lake Success is located within the boundaries of the Manhasset–Lakeville Water District, which provides the entirety of the village with water.

=== Healthcare and emergency services ===
==== Healthcare ====
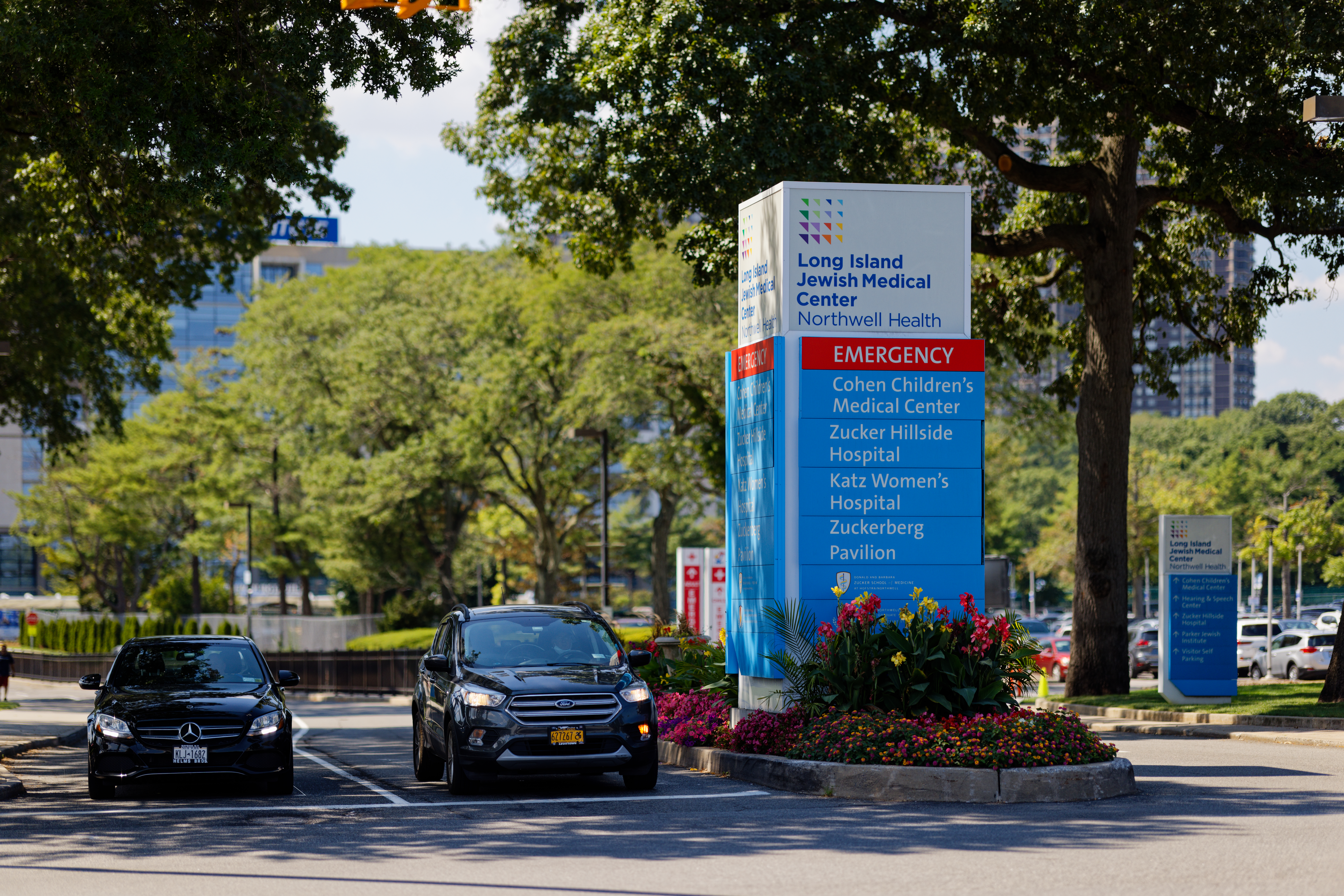
An entrance to Long Island Jewish Medical Center from Lakeville Road in 2022

Portions of Long Island Jewish Medical Center are located within the Village of Lake Success. This hospital, which straddles the Nassau County–New York City border – is operated by Northwell Health.

==== Fire ====
The Manhasset–Lakeville Fire District provides the entirety of the village with fire protection services.

==== Police ====
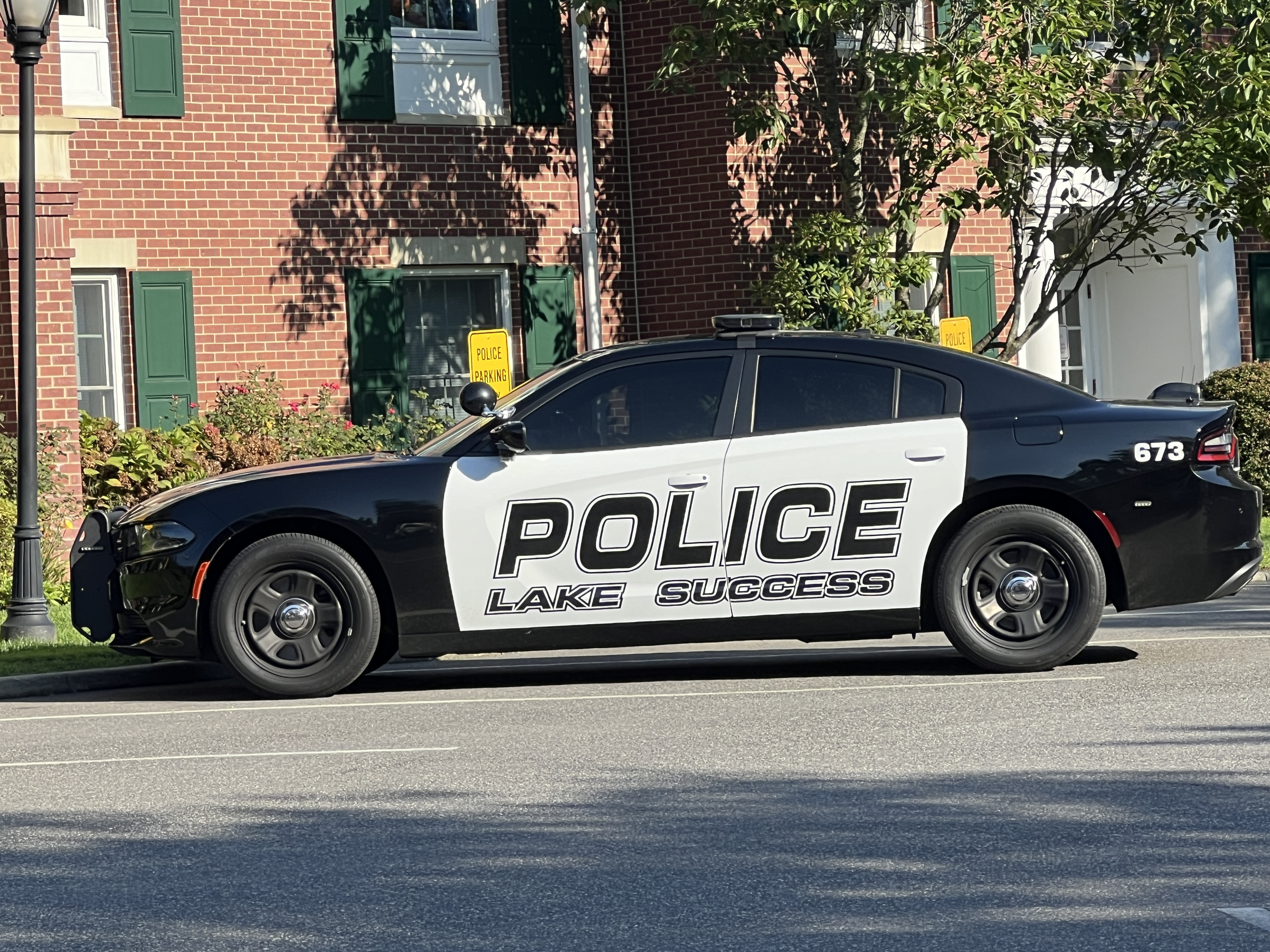
A Lake Success Police Department police car in 2024

The Village of Lake Success is served by its own municipal law enforcement agency, known as the Lake Success Police Department. This village police department exclusively provides Lake Success with police protection. The sole exceptions are the Long Island Expressway and Northern State Parkway, which are patrolled the Nassau County Police Department Highway Patrol and the New York State Police, respectively.

As of 2024, the Lake Success Police Department consists of 23 officers, as well as three full-time and five part-time emergency dispatchers.

== Notable people ==
- Whitey Ford – Professional Hall of Fame baseball pitcher who holds the record for most wins as New York Yankees pitcher.
- Arthur Moore – Labor leader.
- Paul Newman – Actor, film director, race car driver, businessman, and philanthropist; lived on West Woods Road.
- Henry Phipps Jr. – Entrepreneur known for his involvement in the American steel industry.
- Talia Shire – Actress who played Connie Corleone in The Godfather film series and Adrian Balboa in the Rocky film series.
- William Kissam Vanderbilt II – Racing driver and yachtsman; member of the Vanderbilt family.

== See also ==
- List of municipalities in New York
- Lake Ronkonkoma, New York
- Lake Success (lake)
