= Nassau County Legislature =

Lawmaking body of Nassau County, New York

Type
- Type: Unicameral

History
- Established: 1996
- Preceded by: Nassau County Board of Supervisors

Leadership
- Presiding Officer: Howard J. Kopel, Republican
- Deputy Presiding Officer: Thomas McKevitt, Republican
- Alternate Deputy Presiding Officer: Michael Giangregorio, Republican
- Minority Leader: Delia DeRiggi-Whitton, Democrat

Structure
- Seats: 19
- Political groups: Majority (11): Republican (11); Minority (8): Democratic (8)
- Committees: See Standing committees

Elections
- Voting system: First-past-the-post
- Last election: November 4, 2025
- Next election: November 3, 2026

Meeting place
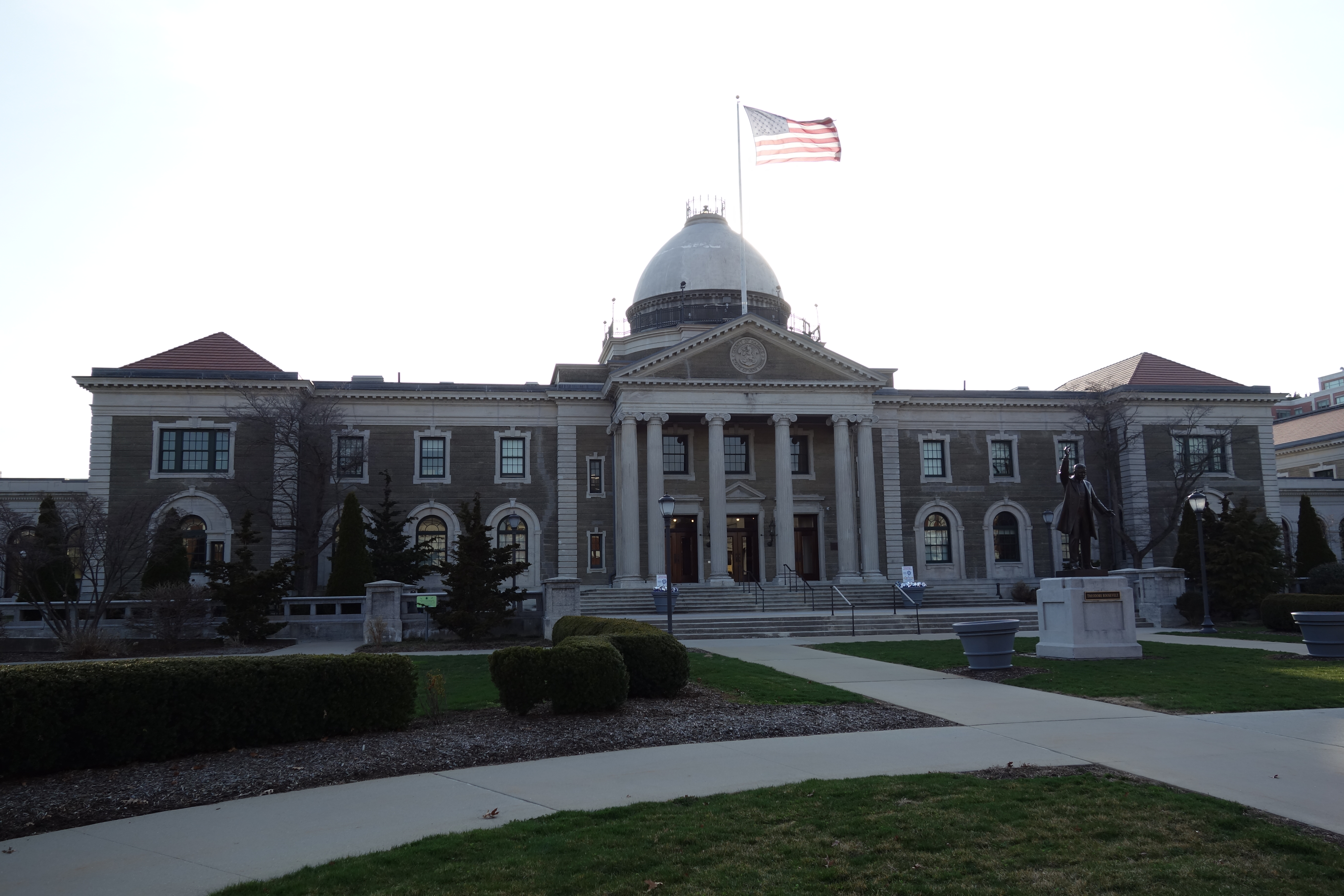
- Theodore Roosevelt Executive and Legislative Building, Nassau County, New York

The Nassau County Legislature is the lawmaking body of Nassau County, New York. The county is divided into 19 legislative districts, each represented by an elected legislator. It was formed in 1996 to succeed the Nassau County Board of Supervisors, which had been ruled unconstitutional.

The legislature serves as a check against the county executive. The legislature monitors the performance of county agencies and makes land use decisions as well as legislating on a variety of other issues. The county legislature also has sole responsibility for approving the county budget. All members can serve for as long as they want (there is no term limit), unless expelled. Legislators are elected every two years.

The presiding officer of the Nassau County Legislature is called the presiding officer. The current presiding officer as of January 2024 is Howard J. Kopel, a Republican. The presiding officer sets the agenda and presides at meetings of the legislature. The Republican Party holds an 11-to-8 majority over the Democratic Party.

== History ==
When the western portions of Queens County joined New York City in 1898, the remaining three towns were formed into Nassau County. The Nassau County Board of Supervisors was then established. It was a six-member board, and each member was a government official from the three towns in the county (Oyster Bay, Hempstead, and North Hempstead) and later the two cities in the county (Glen Cove and Long Beach). The Town of Hempstead had two voting members. The board used a weighted vote system based on the Banzhaf power index, meaning the districts smaller in population had near-no representation on the board.

After countywide referendums in 1967 and 1975 both failed, federal district court Judge Arthur D. Spatt ruled in 1993 that the board of supervisors was unconstitutional, citing its clear violation of the Equal Protection Clause for its failure to adhere to the one man, one vote policy, and failure to represent the minority population. Over a year later, when board members had failed to provide a constitutional successor to the board, the judge said that if they kept ending up in a deadlock and could not choose a new plan, he would make one himself. The board finally chose a plan, creating the Nassau County Legislature, changing the legislative branch of the county for the first time since its establishment, and the first election for the legislature took place in November 1995. The historic first session began on January 1, 1996, with a Republican majority.

The plan adopted by the board of supervisors and written into the Nassau County Charter called for a nineteen-district legislature, with at least two black-majority districts. This new plan has had the legislature fluctuating from a Democratic majority to a Republican majority, and vice versa, contrary to the regularly Republican board of Supervisors.

=== Salary ===
The legislature's salary was made $39,500 in the charter; however that document allows the legislature to raise or lower that salary by law. In December 2015, legislators voted without much debate to raise their salary to $75,000 amidst a county financial crisis; this went into effect the next session in 2017.

== Composition ==
District	Member	Party	Residence	Elected
1	Scott Davis	Democratic	Rockville Centre	2024
2	Viviana Russell	Democratic	Uniondale	2025
3	Carrié Solages	Democratic	Elmont	2022
4	Patrick Mullaney	Republican	Long Beach	2024
5	Olena Nicks	Democratic	Uniondale	2025
6	Debra Mulé	Democratic	Freeport	2018
7	Howard J. Kopel	Republican	Lawrence	2009
8	John J. Giuffre	Republican	Stewart Manor	2021
9	Scott Strauss	Republican	Mineola	2024
10	Mazi Melesa Pilip	Republican (Note: Pilip had been a registered Democrat since 2012, but was elected to the Nassau County Legislature in 2021 and 2023 as a Republican.)	Great Neck	2021
11	Delia DeRiggi-Whitton	Democratic	Glen Cove	2012
12	Michael Giangregorio	Republican	Merrick	2015
13	Thomas McKevitt	Republican	East Meadow	2017
14	Cynthia Nunez	Democratic	Valley Stream	2025
	Kayla Knight	Republican	Wantagh	2025
16	Arnold W. Drucker	Democratic	Plainview	2016
17	Rose Marie Walker	Republican	Hicksville	2009
18	Samantha Goetz	Republican	Locust Valley	2017
19	James D. Kennedy	Republican	Massapequa	2015

Council leaders
Position	Name	Party	District
Presiding officer	Howard J. Kopel	Republican	7
Deputy presiding officer	Thomas McKevitt	Republican	13
Alternate deputy presiding officer	Michael Giangregorio	Republican	12
Minority caucus leader	Delia DeRiggi-Whitton	Democratic	11

== Standing committees and the floor ==
All issues introduced to the legislature is sent to one of the legislature's committees for review and consideration. Then, it is sent to the Rules Committee for further review and consideration. Once through the Rules Committee, it is sent to the floor for all members to discuss, debate, and vote on. If passed, it is sent to the desk of the county executive. If it is signed by the county executive, it is now a local law and is codified in either the Nassau County Administrative Code or the Miscellaneous Laws of Nassau County. All members of the public can attend any public meeting of the legislature, and can speak at floor meetings at a designated time.

=== Committees ===
- Budget Review (Chair: Thomas McKevitt)
- Economic and Community Development and Labor (Chair: James Kennedy)
- Finance (Chair: Thomas McKevitt)
- Government Services and Operations (Chair: vacant)
- Health and Social Services (Chair: Rose Marie Walker)
- Minority Affairs (Chair: Scott Strauss)
- Planning, Development, and the Environment (Chair: Samantha Goetz)
- Public Safety (Chair: Patrick Mullaney)
- Public Works (Chair: Michael Giangregorio)
- Rules (Chair: Howard Kopel)
- Veterans Chair:
- Senior Affairs (Chair: John Giuffré)
- Towns, Villages, and Cities (Chair: Mazi Melesa Pilip)

== Law ==
All legislation intended to become local law is introduced as an issue on the floor. If passed, it becomes local law and is codified either in the Nassau County Administrative Code or the Miscellaneous Laws of Nassau County. Ordinances and Resolutions are also passed the same way, but are not codified.
