= Richard Wyckoff =

American investor and editor

Richard Demille Wyckoff
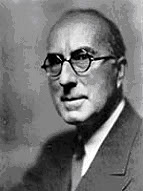
- Richard Demille Wyckoff
- Born: November 2, 1873; Brooklyn, New York
- Died: March 7, 1934 (aged 60); Sacramento, California, U.S.
- Occupations: Securities speculator and financial media publisher
- Spouse(s): Elsie L. Suydam; Aleminia Wyckoff; Cecilia Gertrude Shere; Alma Weiss
- Relatives: Cecil B. Demille

Richard Demille Wyckoff (November 2, 1873 – March 7, 1934) was an American stock promoter, investor, and securities speculator, as well as a financial media author, editor, and publisher. Notably, Wyckoff founded the Magazine of Wall Street, at one point the world's most widely circulated financial publication, and is credited as a pioneer of technical analysis.

== Life and career ==
=== Early life ===
Richard Demille Wyckoff was born on November 2, 1873, in Brooklyn, New York. He was the son of Walter Wychoff. Walter was a financial media publisher and financier.

Alternative sources document that Wyckoff's parents were Judith Annie Stoothoff (b. April 18, 1845) and Charles Benedict Wyckoff (b. March 30, 1844). Charles Benedict was a real estate developer and a veteran of the American Civil War.

Wyckoff, pictured in his younger years.

In 1888, Richard Wyckoff became a messenger boy for a firm of brokers, later becoming a broker and stock promoter himself before entering the publishing world in the early 1900s. Wyckoff would continue to act as a stock promoter, trader, and investor, speculating mainly in stock and bonds, until the end of his life.

=== Wyckoff Estate ===
Walter Wyckoff contracted architect Chester A. Patterson and landscape designer Clarence Fowler to build a 7600 square foot mansion on a 10-acre estate, dubbed “Twin Lindens” or the "Wyckoff Estate", next to Alfred P. Sloan’s home in a wealthy part of New York (West Shore Road, Kings Point, Great Neck).

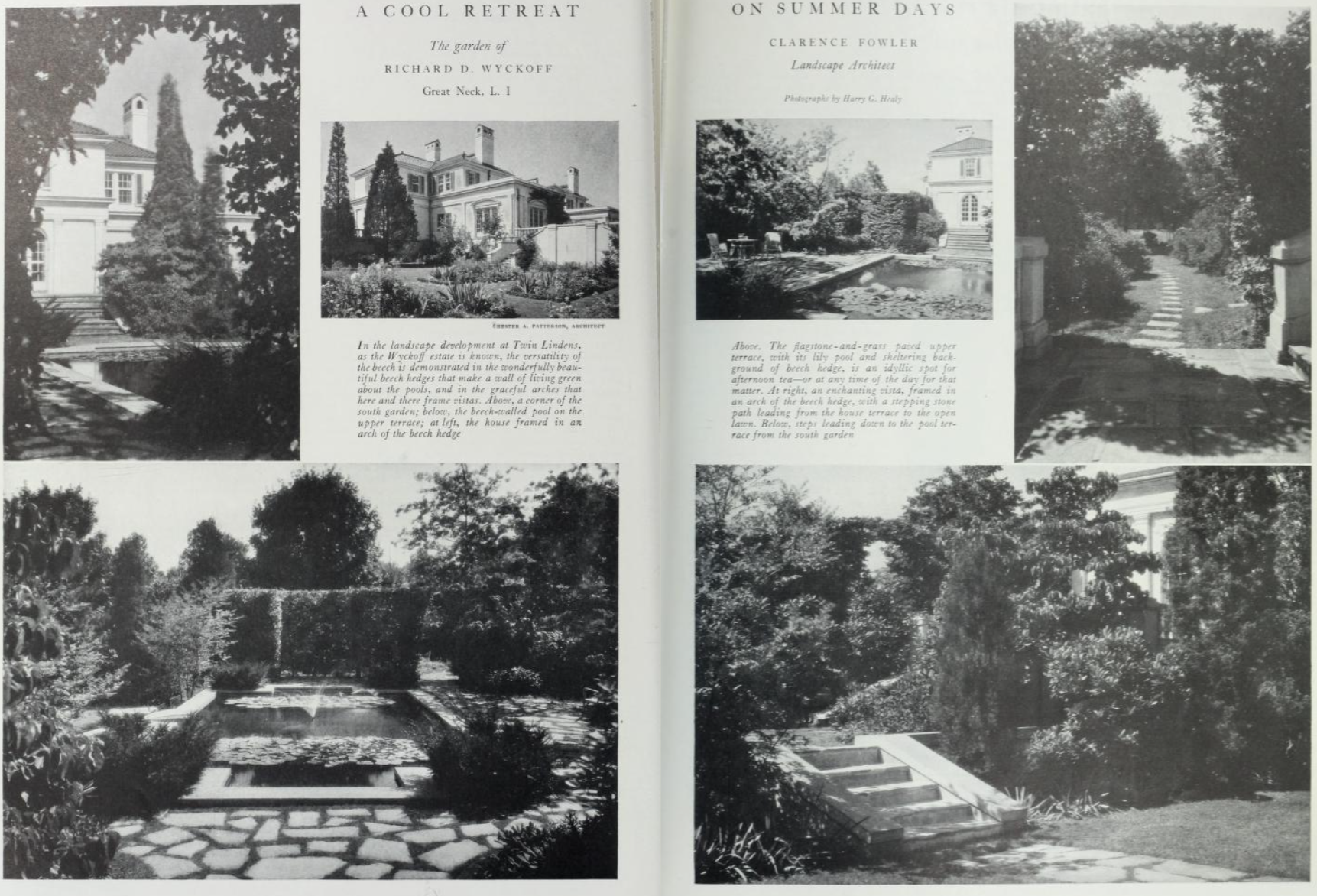
The Wyckoff Estate (Twin Lindens) c. 1927

Richard Wyckoff later inherited this property from Walter. While several independent sources indicate that Walter bought and built the Wyckoff Estate, Richard claimed that it was he who purchased the land and built a $250,000 mansion (in contemporaneous USD). The discrepancy might stem from the fact that Richard tried to hide or protect his assets from the numerous personal and professional lawsuits he was subject to throughout the 1910s and 1920s, by placing those assets under other peoples' names.

Other sources state that Cecilia Shere, Wyckoff's one-time wife and business partner, purchased the land and built the home in question with her profits from the Magazine of Wall Street.

=== The Magazine of Wall Street ===
In early volumes, Wyckoff wrote for his magazine under the pen name “Rollo Tape”, as per this November 1909 cover article.

Wyckoff founded The Ticker, of the Ticker Publishing Co., in 1907; it was rebranded in 1911 as The Magazine of Wall Street. The magazine went on to become the world's most widely-circulated financial publication in the early 1900s, surpassing The Wall Street Journal.

In 1929, near the magazine's zenith, its value was reported to be between $39,000,000 and $117,000,000 (in 2026 USD) and it employed 200 people.

=== Divorce ===
In highly publicized and prolonged divorce-related proceedings, Wyckoff was forced to sell the magazine to Cecilia Wyckoff (née Shere), Wyckoff's one-time mistress and later wife.

Shere, called "redoubtable" by Benjamin Graham, initially became Wyckoff's secretary and stenographer at the magazine and took on a decision-making role within the magazine thereafter. Wyckoff gave Shere 25% of the magazine on engagement and a further 25% upon marriage. Wyckoff gave another 49% of the magazine in later years as he sought to protect his assets from litigation.

Wyckoff alleged that Shere had gained 99% control of the magazine through manipulation, emotional and otherwise. Shere countered that she earned control through sound business practices. Wyckoff rebutted that her claims of "genius" business decisions were propaganda and a ruse intended to take credit for all of his work and success. The courts adjudged, and contemporaneous reports stated, that Shere was the reason for why the magazine was profitable in the first place and that, early on, she had taken equity more so than salary as compensation for her work. The court in the case stated that Wyckoff never turned a profit prior to Shere taking over major business decisions. It was further stated that when Shere had a prolonged absence, Wyckoff indebted the company once again, which Shere later reversed. Wyckoff had devoted most of his time to stock promotion and other investment activities rather than running the magazine.

The courts ultimately gave Shere full control of the magazine, the entire Wyckoff Estate (Twin Lindens), and custody of both of their children.

=== Financial struggles and later years ===
Wyckoff settled for a nominal position and a good salary within the magazine but was quickly let go by the sole owner at that point, Shere. The divorce proceeding further awarded Wyckoff $500,000 in 7% bonds. However, the interest on the bonds didn't cover child support, forcing Wyckoff to further compensate Shere every year. Shere claimed that Wyckoff failed to pay the remainder of the child support he owed her, so Shere ordered the cessation of interest payments on the bonds in order to recover the child support she said she was owed. Wyckoff sued Shere and the Ticker Publishing Co. to recover the interest. The matter was not settled until after Wyckoff's death, by his estate.

The divorce-related proceedings ultimately left Wyckoff in poor health and financial strain serious enough to temporarily live in "a broken-down public inn". Wyckoff entered a temporary semi-retirement after losing control of the magazine, focusing on a small publishing enterprise consisting of selling stock-related books, courses, a newsletter, and a magazine. Experiencing substantial financial problems in his last years, Wyckoff asked his friends and family for their contacts' information so he could attempt to sell them his publications.

=== Personal life and death ===
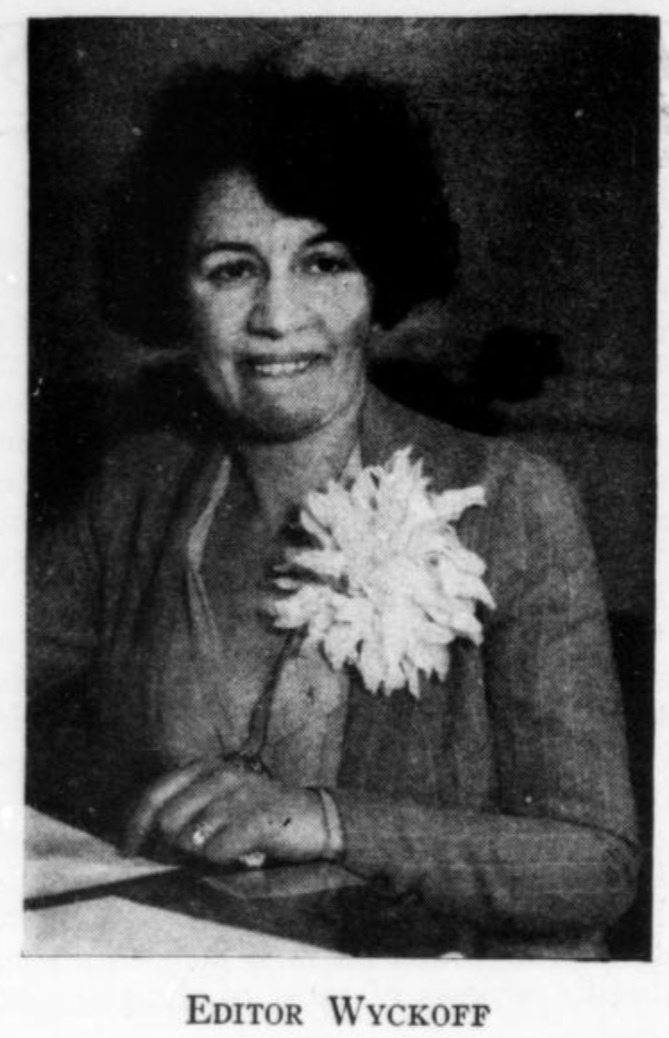
Cecilia Gertrude Shere c. 1928

Wyckoff was a Republican.

Wyckoff had a daughter, Jane, with his first wife. At one point, Wyckoff was married to Elsie L. Suydam. Soon after founding The Ticker, Wyckoff began having an affair with a young singer from Detroit, Cecilia ("Carrie") Gertrude Shere (b. May 30, 1888). Wyckoff's then-wife, Aleminia Wyckoff, became suspicious and hired a private detective, discovered the affair, and filed for divorce. Shere and Wyckoff were married shortly thereafter, on August 26, 1913. They had two girls, Gloria Wyckoff Dennison (b. January 23, 1916) and Dorothy (b. March 21, 1918).

After Wyckoff's divorce from Shere, he married Alma Weiss, who became executor of his estate after his death. Wyckoff died from a heart condition on March 7, 1934, in Sacramento, California. His body was taken to a funeral chapel in Brooklyn, New York.

Wyckoff was a cousin of Cecil B. DeMille.

== Controversies, lawsuits, and fraud ==
=== Market forecasting and trading acumen ===
Government records show that Wyckoff personally traded and invested in the markets.

Wyckoff claimed that he was able to make accurate, albeit not infallible, market forecasts via his trading abilities and felt confident enough to charge for his forecasting services via his publications; such as the profitable Trend Letter, a trading newsletter. Tax records, excluding data from Wyckoff’s business of pool operations, market making, and underwriting syndicates, show the following trades on his personal, non-professional, account:

Year	Total Transactions	Total Shares	Total Value (Bonds only, contemporaneous USD)
1916	68	8,450	N/A
1917	956	98,855	N/A
1918	600	101,191	$155,000
1919	1,443	431,014	$113,100
1920	402	67,799	$258,000
1921	N/A	24,215	$20,000
1922	389	59,078	$83,000

Wyckoff's contemporaries did not concur with the notion that Wyckoff had superior forecasting or trading abilities. While acknowledging Wyckoff's pioneering work in technical analysis and that Wyckoff was a speculator, William Feather stated that Wyckoff's most substantial profits came mainly from publishing.

“…Mr. Wyckoff publishes a trend letter, which is advertised to tell investors, for so much per week, when to get in and out of the market, and by these quick gyrations snatch out of Wall Street a big profit…Wyckoff, is said to have played the stock market for more than twenty years and has not made any millions out of it, if anything at all…”

From left to right, publisher Louis Guenther (a contemporary and critic of Wyckoff) is honored by G. Keith Funston, president of the New York Stock Exchange, and Edward T. McCormick, president of the New York Curb Exchange, at a bronze plaque dedication on Oct. 3, 1952.

Another contemporary, Louis Guenther (founder of Financial World) failed to support the assertion that Wyckoff had any superior market forecasting acumen nor any superior stock picking skills, going so far as to accuse Wyckoff of failure in the more financially conservative bond business, of outright "financial charlatanism", and perpetrating "Ponzi"-like "get-rich-quick" schemes. Guenther stated Wyckoff "cannot make money for himself" and that, with respect to Wyckoff's occasional correct predictions: "...there is not a fool in Wall Street who cannot...claim to have done the same thing."

Guenther did not dispute that Wyckoff was likely overall profitable in his market activities when engaged in market manipulation in his roles as a stockbroker, stock sponsor, stock promoter, or as a senior employee (insider) within a company whose shares he promoted to his readers, associates, and employees. As such, Wyckoff likely made potentially substantial profits from the fees, commissions, or appreciation of shares he received when acting in such capacities.

Even when Wyckoff engaged in the aforementioned capacities, his market returns were inconsistent. For example, tax records indicate that Wyckoff was likely an overall profitable market operator from 1915 to 1919 via his collection of fees, commissions, and capital stock as compensation for acting as a sponsor, promoter, or pool participant. In the period 1921–1923, Wyckoff promoted his market forecasting and stock picking acumen to his readers via a subscription newsletter and a market analytics service. But during this period, tax records reveal that Wyckoff suffered losses in the markets in all three years. Particularly, in 1921 Wyckoff had a net loss of over $3,000,000 (in 2026 USD).

=== Market manipulation and lawsuits ===
In order to secure trading-related profits, Wyckoff relied on numerous "tricks" and market manipulation techniques, such as pool operations and the solicitation of one form of payoff or another in order to "push" a stock by promoting it to his paying subscribers. These techniques were viewed as highly unethical during his time but they were not fully criminalized until several months after Wyckoff's death, with the passage of the Securities Exchange Act of 1934.

==== First series of exposés and libel lawsuit ====
Wyckoff was criticized for his market manipulation techniques by his contemporaries, including Guenther. In a series of exposés beginning in the 1910s, Guenther highlighted how Wyckoff deceived and manipulated his readers over multiple years and across several different stocks (such as Emerson Phonograph Co.), netting Wyckoff and his associates profits while leaving his magazine and Trend Letter subscribers with losses. Guenther furnished evidence to buttress his claims, including analysis by John Moody. Wyckoff issued a series of his own replies accusing Guenther, among other things, of envy. Guenther claimed that Wyckoff's replies never addressed Guenther's central accusations.

One of the phonographs Wyckoff planned on marketing, dubbed “The Ford”, c. 1920

Wyckoff's market manipulation techniques involved a hybrid of pump and dump, pool operations, media manipulation, wash trading, churning, and painting the tape:

"From the very day the Emerson stock was put on the Curb Market, Wyckoff began to start an artificial churn going. He paid for the advertising of it done by brokers in order to convey the impression of great activity. By the following May, only a month later, he succeeded in putting the price to over $13 a share and finally ran it up to near $17, or over three times the par value of the shares,whereas’ the project was still but a shell. Nor was $17 the height of him, a number of publishers who testified to writing laudatory articles to boost the stock for pay were severely reprimanded and one was held to the Grand Jury, the judge holding him a “particeps criminis” to the fraud. Yet, here as in other instances, we see Wyckoff using The Magazine of Wall Street to land its blind subscribers into his various flotations...Wyckoff operated a pool in the stock through the defunct firm of Morris & Pope, where he had a joint account with Victor Emerson [Emerson's founder]...He did not refrain from washing the stock, a practice very much condemned in Wall Street...It was inevitable for the time to arrive when such market operation could no longer retain their bullish vitality, for they could not always depend upon the artificial stimulant imparted to them by their sponsor. So when it became necessary for Wyckoff to explain away the then declining price tendency of Emerson stock, he charged its weakness to raids by bucket shops, an explanation common among get rich-quick promoters and employed frequently to conceal real selling by stockholders...What Mr. Wyckoff's object was in buying and selling the identical certificates at almost the identical price and pay brokerage in addition is self evident, to establish the semblance of activity and a quotation for the stock."

After Guenther published his accusations, Wyckoff sued Guenther and the Financial World for libel, seeking over $3,000,000 in damages (in 2026 USD), stating he would disprove Guenther.

Wyckoff's attorneys began to stall the commencement of the trial for several years but ultimately ran out of legal maneuvers to do so, and dropped the lawsuit quietly instead. The court ordered Wyckoff had to pay costs. Wyckoff discontinued his Trend Letter market forecasting service shortly before dropping the lawsuit, claiming he wanted to focus on his magazine instead.

==== Second series of exposés, plagiarism, and lawsuit ====
The Silver King mine of Arizona, shown here c. 1880s, was de-facto exhausted by 1891, well before Wyckoff promoted its stock to his readers.

In the early 1920s, after Wyckoff dropped his libel suit against Guenther, Guenther pressed further with additional evidence and exposés of Wyckoff's questionable securities-related activities.

Shown here side-by-side, Wyckoff’s article plagiarized, nearly word-for-word, another publication’s article as part of his promotional campaign for a silver mine stock.

The evidence Guenther presented showed that Wyckoff plagiarized, nearly word-for-word, an older investment article from The Arizona Republican as part of his own, longer, promotional article for a failing silver mine stock. During the article's publication, Wyckoff was the magazine's founder, owner, and editor but his article did not include a byline.

At the time of Wyckoff's recommendation, Guenther hired an analyst who showed the stock was “more a myth than a mine”. An issue of The Engineering and Mining Journal stated, decades prior to Wyckoff's promotion of the mining stock, that the mine in question was known to have been exhausted before 1891. The stock's price collapsed not long after Wyckoff's recommendation, with Wyckoff unloading his shares on his readers and even his unsuspecting pool associates. While Wyckoff defended himself, Guenther stated that Wyckoff deflected away from the central accusations Guenther had leveled.

An ad for the likely, or fully, fictitious Savold Tire Company c. 1920

Guenther went on to accuse Wyckoff of knowingly promoting many other failing enterprises to his readers, notably that of Savold, a series of state-by-state tire retreading businesses that may have been nearly, or completely, fictitious in nature. Savold's sponsors and promoters, including Wyckoff, would float each of the states' Savold companies separately, and in quick succession. Benjamin Graham, Wyckoff's employee at the time, invested and quickly made a profit from the first Savold company floated on the market. But from the outset, Graham had strong reservations about the situation:

"In spite of my innate conservatism and commonsense understanding that operations of this kind were essentially phoney, cupidity ruled me..."

After Graham netted a quick and sizeable profit, he was allowed to invest in the shares of the last Savold company to be publicly offered. Upon its public offering, the share price thereof almost immediately fell to zero and all of the Savold companies quickly disappeared thereafter with everyone's funds. Graham lost about $600,000 (in 2026 USD) of his money. The proceeds from the public offerings went to the promoters instead of the company's treasury, while Wyckoff went in and out of the market as the share prices rose in the first of the floated companies. Ultimately Wyckoff, as part of Savold's pool operation, was accused of manipulating the stock's price upwards and unloading his shares at the very top for profit, leaving the public, some of his pool's associates, and even employees like Graham with losses. Graham concluded:

"What happened to the Savold companies themselves? I never really knew...if they ever really existed. There is no trace of any of them in the financial manuals...All that we—as so-called insiders—ever knew about those enterprises was the (supposed) nature of their business.This information appeared in a flimsy “descriptive circular” of unknown origin. Yet, gullible as we were, we had felt highly privileged to put our money in this manipulative scheme, relying on a speculative public even greedier and more foolish to pay us a huge profit..as far as I know, the only thing real about Savold Tire itself was the electric sign at Columbus Square which bore its name."

Savold's stock certificates became worthless overnight. Example certificate, c. 1920.

In the months after Guenther's exposés, Wyckoff's magazine published several anonymous articles defending Wyckoff and attacking Guenther. These articles attacked Guenther's family, business practices, and reputation. The articles further defended Wyckoff, stating that Guenther was out to tarnish Wyckoff's and his magazine's reputation for competitive reasons, and that Guenther had published “half-truths”. The matter led to several years of renewed litigation between the two parties, with Wyckoff pushing for a public trial. Ultimately, the parties dropped the matter quietly instead.

=== Fraud ===
Wyckoff was accused of, or sued for, fraudulent activities multiple times.

In one case Thomas Ashburner, a clerk for Rogers Peet and Company and former bookkeeper, sued Wyckoff for fraud and won.

Ashburner subscribed to The Magazine of Wall Street and paid for a subscription to Wyckoff's Trend Letter, a market forecasting service Wyckoff claimed as having made many of its subscribers rich. Around the end of 1914, Ashburner received a prospectus for Gotham Vending Company, a movie theater vending machine company. Wyckoff was Gotham's president and chief stock promoter. The prospectus, penned by Wyckoff, promoted an investment opportunity in Gotham.

This vending machine, manufactured by North American Vending Company for Gotham Vending Company, was placed on the back of a theater seat and dispensed gum or chocolate. From Thomas Ashburner v. Richard D. Wyckoff.

After reading the prospectus, Ashburner met with Wyckoff and invested over $50,000 (in 2026 USD) in exchange for shares. Wyckoff also promised Ashburner a job as a bookkeeper in the company at a later time. Ashburner would invest a much smaller amount in a second round of investment later on.

In cross-examination, Wyckoff did not deny that he ultimately made false claims in the prospectus about the vending machine and its performance but, on appeal, his attorney claimed Wyckoff did so unknowingly.

The jury found Wyckoff's actions to be fraudulent and awarded Ashburner full restitution. Wyckoff requested a new trial but was denied and so appealed the decision. Writing an article about the initial court case in his magazine, Wyckoff proclaimed he'd be found completely innocent on appeal.

However, in a unanimous decision the nine judges of the appellate court upheld the lower court's findings of fraud. The appellate court lowered the value of the restitution by an amount equal to the smaller, second round of investment, claiming Ashburner should’ve known by the second round of investment that the prospectus’ claims were fraudulent. Ashburner recovered the full amount of his initial, larger, investment and Wyckoff did not contest the matter further.

Despite this, Guenther lamented that U.S. authorities did not scrutinize Wyckoff's “scandalous” “manipulations” more often and more closely.

== Supporters, critics, and reputation ==
=== Supporters ===
Posthumously, Wyckoff's supporters have claimed that he was one of the "five titans of technical analysis", was “now considered a legend”, and that he began his publishing career because of the “appalling losses in securities suffered annually by millions of people who do not realize what they are risking and have an amazingly small knowledge of the market”. Wyckoff petitioned the U.S. Congress to end bucket shops that took advantage of the public.

Linda Raschke stated:

"I respect [Richard] Wyckoff for his attempt to organize the way we think about the market by distinguishing among the distribution, the accumulation, and the markup phases."

=== Neutral ===
Wyckoff was described as a "tough crazy genius" in a biography of Joseph Hirshhorn, Wyckoff's one-time employee. Wyckoff's reputation as a "tough" individual was echoed by Wyckoff's great nephew, Anthony T. Tabell. Tabell's father was briefly employed as a technical analyst for Wyckoff, with the younger Tabell stating that "nobody lasted long with Wyckoff".

Benjamin Graham, another one of Wyckoff's employees, stated that he tried to remain on good terms with both Wyckoff and Shere despite the strain between the latter two.

=== Critics ===
Louis Guenther, founder of Financial World, stated that Wyckoff was a "wolf in sheep's closing", "...the most egotistical and hypocritical financial fakir that has appeared on the financial horizon of Wall Street in recent years", and that "Ponzi was more modest" since Wyckoff promised higher returns than Ponzi ever did. Owing to his reputation for market manipulation, Guenther claimed that Wyckoff's nickname was "Slippery Dick" within the inner circle of Wall Street.

== Wyckoff method ==
Wyckoff wrote about numerous trading techniques. These techniques evolved and, at times, contradicted one another throughout his decades of published works; including books, articles, and interviews. For example: Wyckoff at one point criticized charts and held that tape reading was a superior method to trading, but later admitted that he changed his mind over time.

Towards the end of his life, Wyckoff advertised a multi-part correspondence course on the method he claimed to use to trade speculative financial assets. The course material was leased, not sold, at a cost of approximately $10,000 for the first, 400-page, part of the course (in 2025 inflation-adjusted USD).

Wyckoff’s correspondence stock trading course upsold day traders into a proprietary, subscription, analytics service seen in a separate advertisement here.

Since then, this method has been dubbed “The Wyckoff Method” or “The Wyckoff Theory” and it was considerably rewritten by his method's promoters in the years following his death. Wyckoff's course focused on price action and some aspects of volume analysis; although Wyckoff stated that a thorough look into his style of volume analysis required an additional work, which he did not live to publish. Part of the instructional course did not disclose key details of his method of price-volume analysis, instead upselling the reader on an additional subscription service whereupon the necessary analysis would be mailed out instead.

Wyckoff stated repeatedly in his works that his method of trading is subjective and cannot be reduced to “mechanical” or mathematical means, which may help explain the contradictions and ambiguities throughout his own texts, including those within the aforementioned course. As a consequence of the Wyckoff Method's subjectivity, contradictions, and lack of completeness, it is not possible to objectively measure its efficacy and this, thereby, may help explain why peer-reviewed and falsifiable research into its efficacy is almost non-existent. Limited published research on very specific aspects of the broader Wyckoff Method may cite—not Wyckoff's own published materials—but the derivative materials composed by his later followers and proponents. Such derivative methods are generally dubbed “Wyckoff 2.0” in order to distinguish them from Wyckoff's own works. Researchers may erroneously conflate Wyckoff 2.0 with the original Wyckoff Method, even though such derivative methods may not accurately mirror Richard Wyckoff's original information.

== Selected Works ==
Richard Wyckoff authored several books on stock market trading and technical analysis, including:

- Studies in Tape Reading
- How I Trade and Invest in Stocks and Bonds
- Stock Market Technique
- Jesse Livermore's Methods of Trading in Stocks

== See also ==
- Ralph Nelson Elliott
- Jesse Livermore
- Charles Dow
- William Gann
