= Kings Point, New York =

- Village
- Incorporated Village of Kings Point
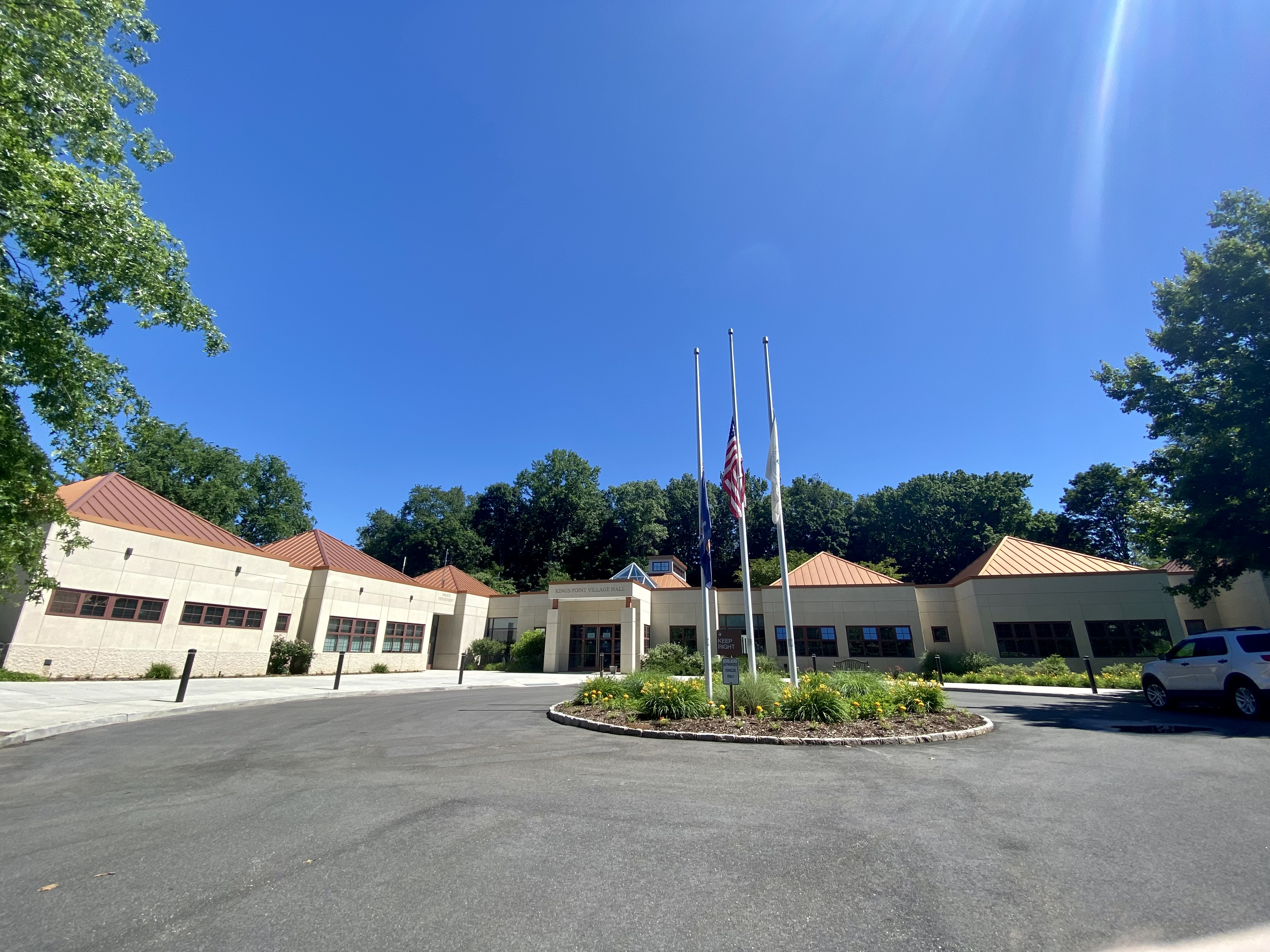
- Kings Point Village Hall in 2021

- Location in Nassau County and the state of New York

- Location on Long Island Location within the state of New York
- Coordinates: 40°48′56″N 73°44′16″W
- Country: United States
- State: New York
- County: Nassau
- Town: North Hempstead
- Incorporated: November 1924
- Named for: The King family

Government
  - Mayor: Kouros "Kris" Torkan
  - Deputy Mayor: Hooshang Nematzadeh

Area
  - Total: 4.00 sq mi (10.37 km^{2})
  - Land: 3.36 sq mi (8.70 km^{2})
  - Water: 0.64 sq mi (1.67 km^{2})
- Elevation: 26 ft (8 m)

Population (2020)
  - Total: 5,619
  - Density: 1,672.8/sq mi (645.87/km^{2})
- Time zone: UTC-5 (Eastern (EST))
  - Summer (DST): UTC-4 (EDT)
- ZIP Codes: 11024 (Kings Point); 11023 (Great Neck)
- Area codes: 516, 363
- FIPS code: 36-39694
- GNIS feature ID: 0954670
- Website: www.villageofkingspoint.gov

Kings Point is a village at the tip of Great Neck Peninsula within the Town of North Hempstead in Nassau County, on the North Shore of Long Island, in New York, United States. The population was 5,619 at the time of the 2020 census.

The Incorporated Village of Kings Point is known for its large Iranian Jewish population, and for being home to the United States Merchant Marine Academy.

== History ==
The area now consisting of the Village of Kings Point – like the rest of the Great Neck Peninsula – was originally inhabited by the Matinecock Native Americans. The first European settlers arrived in the area during the 17th century.

The Village of Kings Point incorporated in November 1924. It is named for the King family, which owned large portions of land in the area.

In 1942, the United States government acquired the land within the village for the permanent home of the United States Merchant Marine Academy – including the former Gold Coast estate of Walter P. Chrysler; President Franklin Delano Roosevelt dedicated the college in 1943.

The entire region was once known as Hewlett's Point after the Hewlett family, who also owned land in the area; this name is still used at times, in reference to the northernmost tip of the village.

== Geography ==
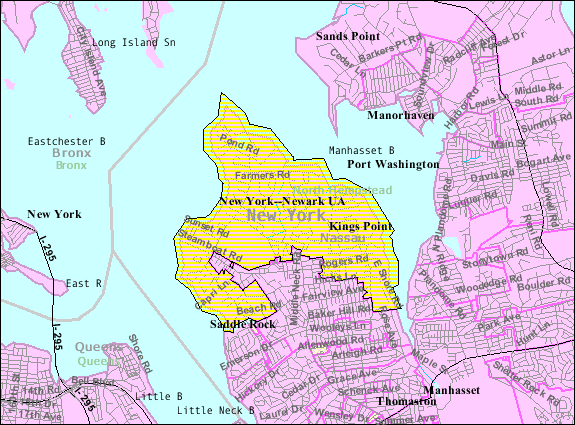
U.S. Census map of Kings Point

According to the United States Census Bureau, the village has an area of 4.0 square miles (10.3 km^{2}), of which 3.3 square miles (8.7 km^{2}) is land and 0.6 square miles (1.7 km^{2}), or 16.08%, is water.

Kings Point is surrounded on three sides by water: Little Neck Bay to the west, the Long Island Sound to the north, and Manhasset Bay to the east.

=== Drainage ===
According to the United States Geological Survey and the United States Environmental Protection Agency, Saddle Rock is located within the Little Neck Bay and Manhasset Bay Watersheds, which are, in turn, located within the larger Long Island Sound/Atlantic Ocean Watershed.

=== Climate ===
The Village of Saddle Rock features a humid subtropical climate (Cfa) under the Köppen climate classification. As such, the village experiences hot, humid summers and cold winters, and experiences precipitation throughout the entirety of the year.

== Demographics ==
Historical population
Census	Pop.	Note	%±
1930	1,294		—
1940	1,247		−3.6%
1950	2,445		96.1%
1960	5,410		121.3%
1970	5,614		3.8%
1980	5,234		−6.8%
1990	4,843		−7.5%
2000	5,076		4.8%
2010	5,005		−1.4%
2020	5,619		12.3%
U.S. Decennial Census

=== Racial and ethnic composition ===
Kings Point village, New York – Racial and ethnic composition Note: the US Census treats Hispanic/Latino as an ethnic category. This table excludes Latinos from the racial categories and assigns them to a separate category. Hispanics/Latinos may be of any race.
Race / Ethnicity (NH = Non-Hispanic)	Pop 2000	Pop 2010	Pop 2020	% 2000	% 2010	% 2020
White alone (NH)	4,593	4,515	4,680	90.48%	90.21%	83.29%
Black or African American alone (NH)	43	40	88	0.85%	0.80%	1.57%
Native American or Alaska Native alone (NH)	3	1	0	0.06%	0.02%	0.00%
Asian alone (NH)	180	167	307	3.55%	3.34%	5.46%
Native Hawaiian or Pacific Islander alone (NH)	0	0	4	0.00%	0.00%	0.07%
Other race alone (NH)	6	6	23	0.12%	0.12%	0.41%
Mixed race or Multiracial (NH)	152	192	303	2.99%	3.84%	5.39%
Hispanic or Latino (any race)	99	84	214	1.95%	1.68%	3.81%
Total	5,076	5,005	5,619	100.00%	100.00%	100.00%

=== 2020 census ===
As of the 2020 census, Kings Point had a population of 5,619. The median age was 26.1 years. 22.0% of residents were under the age of 18 and 17.4% were 65 years of age or older. For every 100 females, there were 123.5 males, and for every 100 females age 18 and over, there were 129.0 males.

100.0% of residents lived in urban areas, while 0.0% lived in rural areas.

There were 1,293 households, of which 41.1% had children under the age of 18 living in them. Of all households, 74.9% were married-couple households, 9.9% were male-householder households with no spouse or partner present, and 14.2% were female-householder households with no spouse or partner present. About 11.7% of households were made up of individuals, and 8.0% had someone living alone who was 65 years of age or older.

There were 1,416 housing units, of which 8.7% were vacant. The homeowner vacancy rate was 3.3% and the rental vacancy rate was 6.4%.

As of the 2020 census, 37% of the population reported Middle Eastern or North African ancestry. The most reported ancestries were:

- Iranian (32.7%)
- Italian (3.6%)
- Chinese (3.5%)
- Irish (2.9%)
- English (2.3%)
- Israeli (2.1%)
- Russian (1.9%)
- German (1.9%)
- Polish (1.5%)
- Korean (1%)

=== 2000 census ===
As of the census of 2000, there were 5,076 people, 1,401 households, and 1,203 families residing in the village. The population density was 1,519.0 inhabitants per square mile (586.5/km^{2}). There were 1,455 housing units at an average density of 435.4 per square mile (168.1/km^{2}). The racial makeup of the village was 91.67% White, 0.87% African American, 0.08% Native American, 3.55% Asian, 0.65% from other races, and 3.19% from two or more races. Hispanic or Latino of any race were 1.95% of the population.

As of 2000, Kings Point was the most Iranian conurbation in the United States, with 29.7% of its population reporting Iranian Jewish ancestry.

There were 1,401 households, out of which 38.0% had children under the age of 18 living with them, 79.7% were married couples living together, 4.0% had a female householder with no husband present, and 14.1% were non-families. 11.9% of all households were made up of individuals, and 7.4% had someone living alone who was 65 years of age or older. The average household size was 3.14 and the average family size was 3.38.

In the village, the population was spread out, with 24.1% under the age of 18, 17.8% from 18 to 24, 17.4% from 25 to 44, 26.1% from 45 to 64, and 14.6% who were 65 years of age or older. The median age was 37 years. For every 100 females, there were 122.2 males. For every 100 females age 18 and over, there were 125.7 males.

The median income for a household in the village was $116,957, and the median income for a family was $122,692. Males had a median income of $100,714 versus $50,595 for females. The per capita income for the village was $57,965. About 0.8% of families and 2.0% of the population were below the poverty line, including 2.3% of those under age 18 and 2.6% of those age 65 or over.

== Government ==
=== Village government ===
The Village of Kings Point is governed by the five-member Village of Kings Point Board of Trustees, which consists of a mayor and four village trustees – one of whom serves as deputy mayor.

As of May 2026, the Mayor of Kings Point is Kouros "Kris" Torkan, the Deputy Mayor is Hooshang Nematzadeh, and the Village Trustees are Tedi Kashinejad, Ira S. Nesenoff, and Shahriar (Ebi) Victory.

==== Village police ====
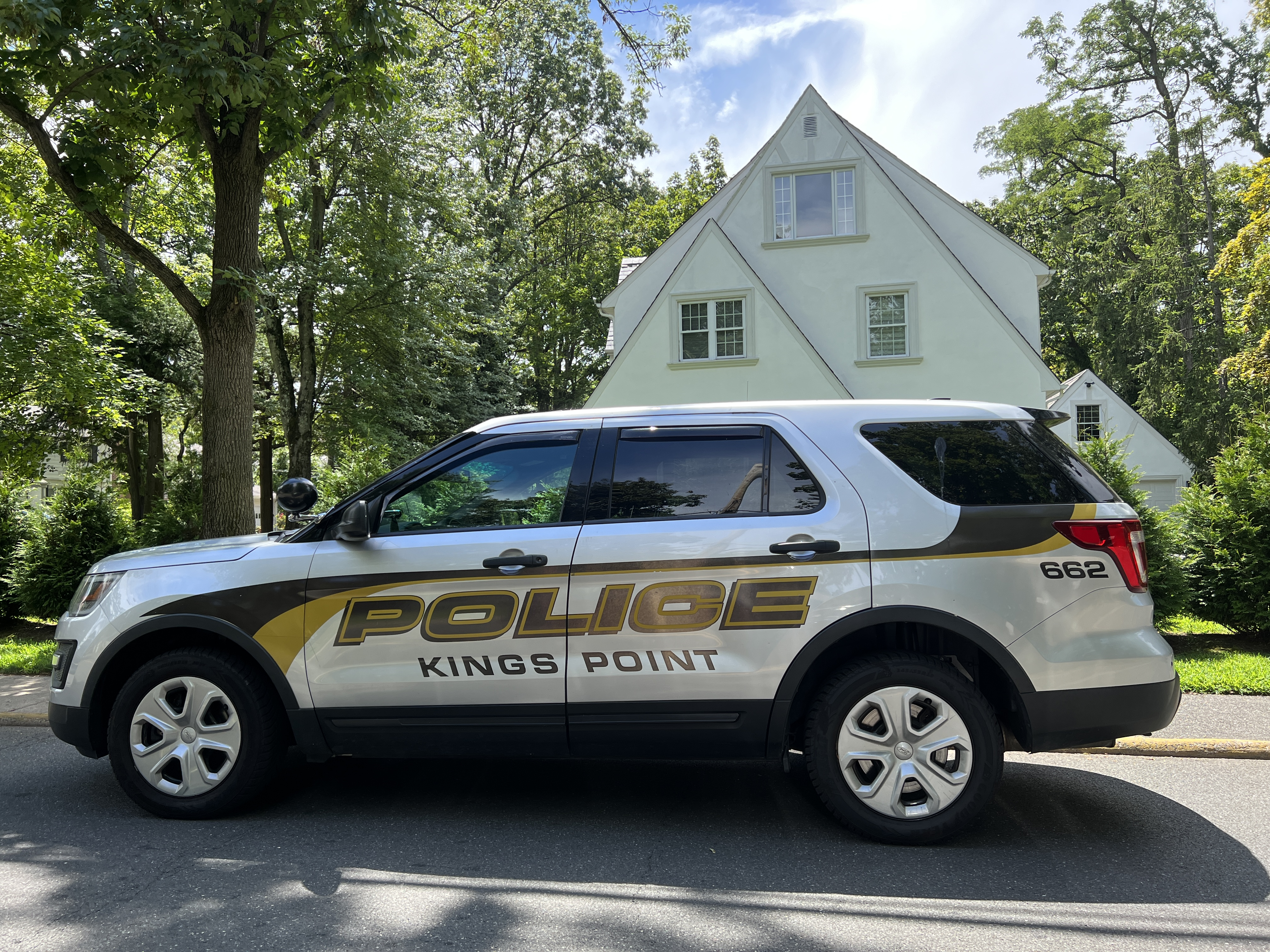
A Kings Point Police Department patrol car in 2022

The Village of Kings Point operates its own police department, known as the Kings Point Police Department. This municipal police department is responsible for providing police protection services within the village.

As of May 2026, the commissioner of the Kings Point Police Department is Daniel Flanagan.

=== Representation in higher government ===
On the town level, Kings Point is in the Town of North Hempstead's 5th council district, which as of May 2026 is represented on the North Hempstead Town Council by Yaron Levy (R–Harbor Hills).

On the county level, Kings Point is in Nassau County's 10th legislative district, which as of May 2026 is represented in the Nassau County Legislature by Mazi Melesa Pilip (R–Great Neck).

On the state level, Kings Point is located within the New York State Assembly's 16th State Assembly district and the New York State Senate's 7th State Senate district, which as of May 2026 are represented by Daniel J. Norber (R–Great Neck) and Jack M. Martins (R–Old Westbury), respectively.

On the federal level, Kings Point is located in New York's 3rd congressional district, which as of April 2026 is represented by Thomas R. Suozzi (D–Glen Cove). Like the rest of New York, it is represented in the United States Senate by Charles E. Schumer (D) and Kirsten Gillibrand (D).

=== Politics ===
Kings Point typically votes for Republicans. In the 2024 U.S. presidential election, the majority of Kings Point voters voted for Donald J. Trump (R).

== Parks and recreation ==
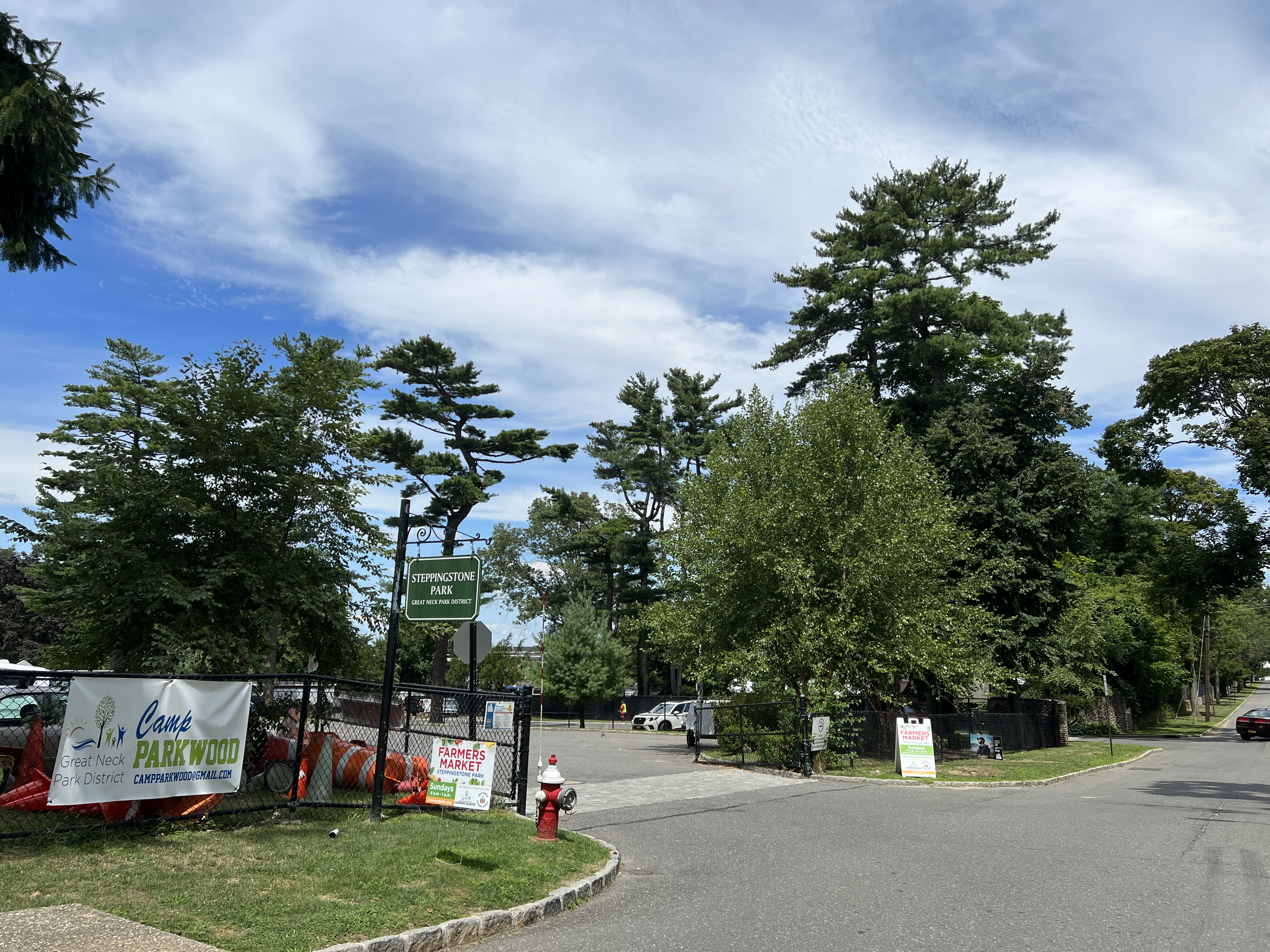
The entrance to Steppingstone Park in 2022

Kings Point is entirely within the boundaries of (and is thus served by) the Great Neck Park District. The special district operates two parks entirely within Kings Point: Kings Point Park and Steppingstone Park and Marina. The park district's Parkwood Pool and Sports Complex is also partially within the village, on its border with the Incorporated Village of Great Neck.

Other recreational facilities in the village include the Broadlawn Harbour Yacht Club, the Kennilworth Pool Club, and the Shelter Bay Yacht Club, all of which are privately owned.

== Education ==
=== School district ===
Kings Point is entirely within the boundaries of (and thus served by) the Great Neck Union Free School District. As such, all children who reside in the village and attend public schools go to Great Neck's schools.

John F. Kennedy Elementary School is also in the village, and Great Neck North Middle School is on Kings Point's border with the Incorporated Village of Great Neck.

=== Library district ===
Kings Point is wholly within the boundaries of (and thus served by) the Great Neck Library District.

=== Higher education ===
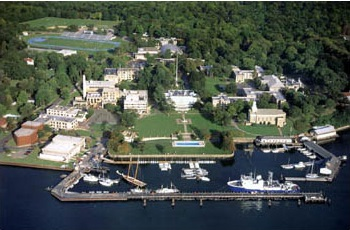
The United States Merchant Marine Academy in 2003

The United States Merchant Marine Academy is in the village, along Little Neck Bay.

== Infrastructure ==
=== Transportation ===
==== Road ====
Major roadways in Kings Point include Bayview Avenue, East Shore Road, Kings Point Road, Middle Neck Road, Redbrook Road, and Steamboat Road.

==== Bus ====
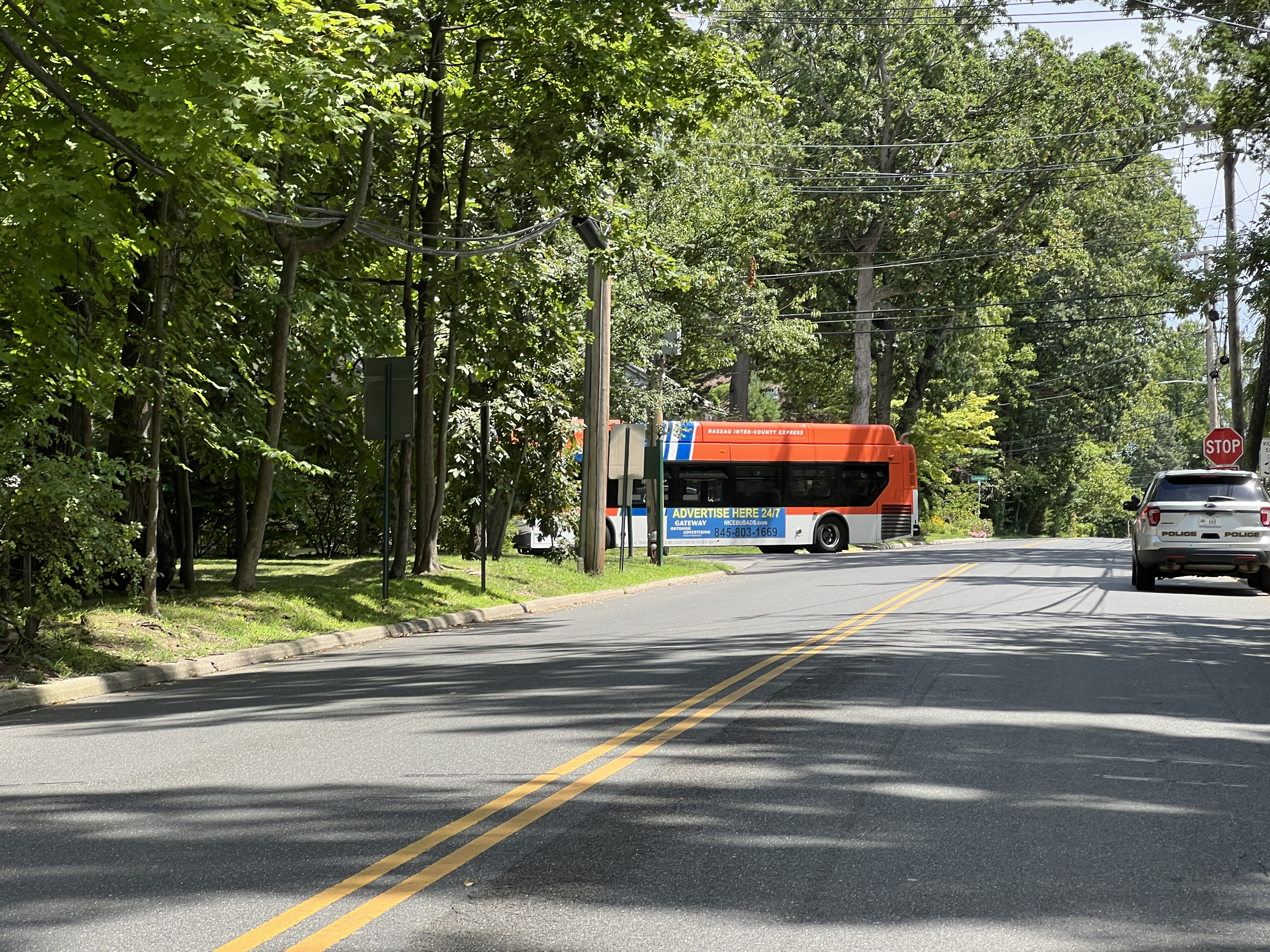
An n58 bus in the village in 2022

Kings Point is served by the n57 and n58 bus routes, which are operated by Nassau Inter-County Express.

=== Utilities ===
National Grid USA provides natural gas to properties within the Village of Kings Point that are hooked up to natural gas lines.

PSEG Long Island provides power to all homes and businesses in Kings Point, on behalf of the Long Island Power Authority.

Kings Point is primarily unsewered. The overwhelming majority of the village, accordingly, relies on cesspools and septic systems. The only major exception is the United States Merchant Marine Academy, which operates its own sanitary sewer network.

Kings Point is within the boundaries of the Water Authority of Great Neck North, which provides the village with water.

== Landmarks ==
Kings Point is the home of the United States Merchant Marine Academy and its maritime museum, the American Merchant Marine Museum, which are listed on the National Register of Historic Places.

There is also a lighthouse known as the Kings Point Light. This is a private building owned and operated by the United States Merchant Marine Academy. The lighthouse atop the chapel shines to bring wayfaring sailors home from sea and students back from Long Island Sound, also known as the "Play Pen".

== Notable people ==
- Sol Atlas (1907–1973), real estate developer
- Sid Caesar (1922–2014), comic actor and writer, lived in Kings Point from the 1950s to the late 1970s in a home on the water
- Barrie Chase (born 1933), actress and dancer, born in Kings Point
- Walter Chrysler (1875–1940), automobile pioneer, died in Kings Point
- George M. Cohan (1878–1942), entertainer, playwright, composer, actor, lyricist, singer, dancer and producer, lived in Kings Point 1914–1920
- Arthur G. Cohen (1930–2014), businessman and real estate developer
- F. Scott Fitzgerald (1896–1940), as noted below
- Vitas Gerulaitis (1954–1994), professional tennis player, former Kings Point resident
- W. R. Grace, as noted above
- Emily Hughes (born 1989), member of the U.S. figure skating team at the 2006 Winter Olympics
- Sarah Hughes (born 1985), gold medalist in figure skating at the 2002 Winter Olympics
- Andy Kaufman (1949–1984), comedian and actor
- Alan King (1927–2004), comedian and actor
- Morris S. Levy, film and television producer
- Fred Ohebshalom (born 1952), real estate developer
- Bobby Rosengarden (1924–2007), jazz drummer and bandleader, former Kings Point resident
- Tamir Sapir (1946/1947–2014), businessman and investor
- Stanley Silverstein (1924–2016), entrepreneur who co-founded Nina Footwear
- Richard Wyckoff (1873–1934), publisher, speculator, founder of The Magazine of Wall Street, built the Wyckoff Estate on West Shore Road.

== Media ==
The Great Neck Record is the newspaper of record for the Village of Kings Point.

== The Great Gatsby ==
In the 1920s, F. Scott Fitzgerald lived in Great Neck, at 6 Gateway Drive in Great Neck Estates, which is probably Great Neck's greatest claim to fame. It was a modest house, not dissimilar to that of Nick, the protagonist of Fitzgerald's novel The Great Gatsby. It is said that Fitzgerald modeled West Egg, the fictional town where Nick lives, next to the mansion of Jay Gatsby, after Great Neck (specifically Kings Point), for its epitome of nouveau riche gaudiness, atmosphere, and lifestyle. He modeled East Egg, the town where Daisy and Tom live, after Great Neck's eastern neighbor Sands Point, which is part of Port Washington.

== See also ==
- List of municipalities in New York
- Sands Point, New York
