= Robert Sarnoff =

American businessman (1918–1997)

Robert W. Sarnoff
- Born: June 2, 1918; New York City, US
- Died: February 23, 1997 (aged 78); New York City, US
- Years active: 1939–1975
- Employer: Radio Corporation of America
- Known for: color television
- Notable work: Victory at Sea
- Board member of: New York Stock Exchange; New York Friars Club
- Spouses: Esme O'Brien (div. 1949); Felicia Schiff Warburg (m. 1949; div. 1969); Anna Moffo (m. 1974)
- Children: 3

Robert William Sarnoff (July 2, 1918 – February 23, 1997) was an American businessman best known as the chief executive officer and chairman of the board of Radio Corporation of America (RCA) after assuming those positions on the retirement of his father, David Sarnoff. During his rise through the company's ranks, he was best known for his advocacy of color television.

Through the early 1970s, Sarnoff attempted to build RCA into a multinational conglomerate which included rental cars, carpet manufacturing, book publishing and sold frozen foods. Focus on RCA's core technology businesses waned and also resulted in the selling of their computer division at a massive financial loss. The company's new direction was not particularly successful, and RCA struggled during the 1973–1975 recession.

After five years as chairman, a "palace revolt" by the board and senior RCA executives removed Sarnoff from the CEO position. After Sarnoff's unsuccessful tenure, RCA never recovered its former stature and was purchased by General Electric in 1986, which liquidated most of the company's assets. After a struggle with cancer, Robert Sarnoff died in 1997 at the age of 78.

== Early life ==
Robert was born in New York City on July 2, 1918, the first of three sons of David Sarnoff. He went to private schools for his basic education and then attended the Phillips Academy for high school. In 1939 he graduated from Harvard University with a bachelor's degree in government and philosophy.

After a year in Columbia Law School, Robert left to enter government service in the broadcasting arm of the Office of Strategic Services. A year later he was commissioned in the US Navy and served in the South Pacific during World War II. After the war, he took a series of positions in media, for a short time as the assistant publisher at The Des Moines Register and Tribune and then moving to Look Magazine.

== Career at RCA ==
After avoiding RCA for some time, Robert Sarnoff took a position as an account executive at RCA's National Broadcasting Company (NBC) in 1948 and held various posts within the company over the next few years. Throughout, he was a strong advocate of RCA'S development of color television. In 1953, he broadcast the first commercial program in color, a production of his commissioned opera, "Amahl and the Night Visitors". His work with NBC required constant travel, during which time he became an avid art collector.

In 1956, he was promoted to the president of NBC, replacing Sylvester Weaver. At the time he stated that "We are committed to color and intend to make the transition as fast as possible." He commissioned the first all-color television station, WNBQ-TV in Chicago (which later became WMAQ-TV) and began an expansion of NBC's broadcasting network. Through this period, NBC was a leader in racial integration, the first network to broadcast a program hosted by Nat King Cole, and the first to have a black actor in a leading role with Bill Cosby in I Spy.

In 1966, Robert was named president and chief operating officer of RCA, and in 1968, he was named chief executive officer (CEO). One of Robert's first actions as CEO was to begin modernizing RCA's image. He retired the original RCA lightning-bolt logo and introduced a new logo featuring just the three letters 'RCA' in a modern squared font. He also largely abandoned the use of the Nipper/"His Master's Voice", "Victor" and "Victrola" trademarks, retaining them only for limited use by RCA Records. RCA reinstated the Nipper/"His Master's Voice" trademarks after Robert was ousted in 1975.

David Sarnoff fell seriously ill in 1970 and was removed from the board, at which point Robert became chairman of the board as well as CEO. The elder Sarnoff died in December, 1971. Earlier that year, Robert sold RCA's computer division to Sperry Rand at a $490 million loss, an action which resulted in significant criticism within the company. Over the next several years he sought to build RCA into a multinational conglomerate, purchasing Random House, Hertz car rental service, Banquet Foods and several other companies.

Through this period, RCA's core business in the technology and home entertainment fields began to decline. The effects of the 1973–1975 recession hit the company particularly hard and Sarnoff was put under increasing pressure. This came to a head in 1975 when Robert resigned in November 1975 with effect from 31 December in what was later called a "palace revolt".

== Personal life ==
Sarnoff married Esme O'Brien and had a daughter Rosita before divorcing in 1949. That year he married Felicia Schiff Warburg and had two more daughters, Serena and Claudia, before divorcing in 1969. In 1970, Felicia remarried to Franklin D. Roosevelt Jr. Robert became known for a series of brief relationships with various recording stars he met through RCA Records. In 1974, He married operatic soprano Anna Moffo.

Sarnoff was a member of the boards of the New York Stock Exchange and a member of the New York Friars Club.

== In popular culture ==
Sarnoff was portrayed by Peter Grosz as NBC president in Doug Wright's 2022 play Good Night, Oscar about an episode of NBC's The Tonight Show with Jack Paar featuring Oscar Levant as a guest on the show.
