= Uzlyany =

Village in Minsk Region, Belarus

Uzlyany Узляны
- Village
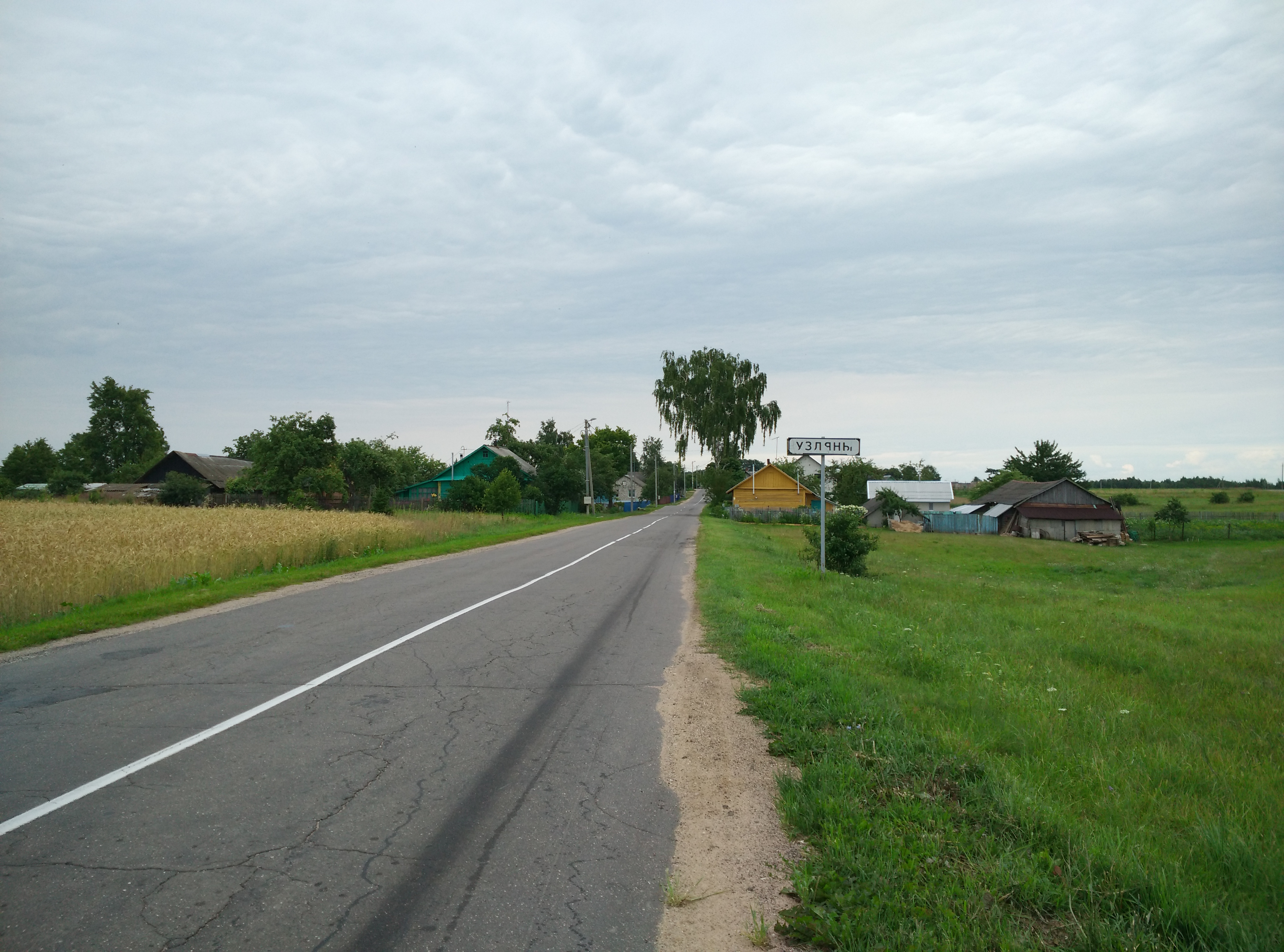

- Location within Belarus
- Coordinates: 53°37′N 27°43′E
- Country: Belarus
- Region: Minsk Region
- District: Pukhavichy District
- Time zone: UTC+3 (MSK)
- Area code: +375 1713

Uzlyany or Vuzlyany (Belarusian: Узляны, Вузляны; Russian: Узляны, romanized: Uzlyany) is a village in Pukhavichy District, Minsk Region, Belarus. It is part of Pyarezhyr selsoviet. Until 2013, it served as the administrative center of Uzlyany selsoviet.

It was formerly a shtetl with a large Jewish population and has a historic Jewish cemetery. In 2026, restoration work was carried out at the cemetery as part of a volunteer project organized by Hillel Minsk.

== Notable people ==
- Eugene Lyons (1898–1985), American journalist and writer
- David Sarnoff (1891–1971), American businessman and pioneer of American radio and television
