= David Sarnoff =

American businessman (1891–1971)

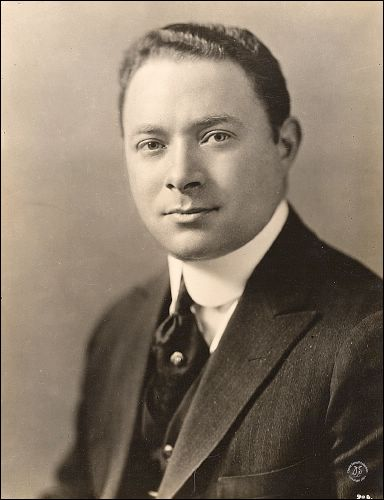
- Sarnoff in 1922
- Born: February 27, 1891; Uzlian, Russian Empire
- Died: December 12, 1971 (aged 80); New York City, U.S.
- Citizenship: United States
- Years active: 1919–1970
- Employers: Marconi Wireless Company; Radio Corporation of America
- Board member of: Rockefeller Brothers Fund
- Spouse: Lizette Hermant (m. 1917)
- Children: 3, including Robert W. Sarnoff
- Relatives: Eugene Lyons, Bernie Privin, Richard Baer, Bruce J. Oreck
- Awards: Junior Achievement US Business Hall of Fame; National Association of Broadcasters Hall of Fame Distinguished Service Award; Television Hall of Fame posthumously; Radio Hall of Fame posthumously; New Jersey Hall of Fame posthumously
- Military career
- Branch: United States Army
- Service years: 1941–1945
- Rank: Brigadier General
- Nickname: "The General"
- Units: Army Signal Corps
- Conflicts: World War II
- Awards: Knight of the Cross of Lorraine (France); Companion of the Resistance (France); Legion of Merit

David Sarnoff (February 27, 1891 – December 12, 1971) was an American businessman who played an important role in the American history of radio broadcasting and television. He led the Radio Corporation of America (RCA) for most of his career in various capacities from shortly after its founding in 1919 until his retirement in 1970.

He headed a conglomerate of telecommunications and media companies, including RCA and NBC, that became one of the largest in the world. Named a Reserve Brigadier General of the Signal Corps in 1945, Sarnoff thereafter insisted on being called "The General" and addressed as "General Sarnoff".

== Early life and career ==
David Sarnoff was born to a Jewish family in Uzlian, a small town in Minsk Governorate, Russian Empire (present-day Belarus), the son of Abraham Sarnoff and Leah Privin. Abraham emigrated to the United States and raised funds to bring the family. Sarnoff spent much of his early childhood in a cheder (or yeshiva) studying and memorizing the Torah. He emigrated with his mother and three brothers and one sister to New York City in 1900 at the age of 9, where he helped support his family by selling newspapers before and after his classes at the Educational Alliance. In 1906 when he was 15 years, his father became incapacitated by tuberculosis, and Sarnoff went to work to support the family. He had planned to pursue a full-time career in the newspaper business, but a chance encounter led to a position as an office boy at the Commercial Cable Company. When his superior refused him leave for Rosh Hashanah, he quit to join the Marconi Wireless Telegraph Company of America on September 30, 1906, and started a career of over 60 years in electronic communications.

Over the next 13 years, Sarnoff rose from office boy to commercial manager of the company, learning about the technology and the business of electronic communications on the job and in libraries. He also served at Marconi stations on ships and posts on Siasconset, Nantucket and the New York Wanamaker Department Store. In 1911, he installed and operated the wireless equipment on a ship hunting seals off Newfoundland and Labrador, and used the technology to relay the first remote medical diagnosis from the ship's doctor to a radio operator at Belle Isle with an infected tooth.

The following year, he led two other operators at the Wanamaker station in an effort to confirm the fate of the Titanic. Always the self-promoter, Sarnoff later exaggerated his role as the sole hero who stayed by his telegraph key for three days to receive information on the Titanic's survivors. Schwartz questions whether Sarnoff, who was a manager of the telegraphers by the time of the disaster, was working the key although that brushes aside concerns about corporate hierarchy. The event began on a Sunday when the store would have been closed.

Over the next two years, Sarnoff earned promotions to chief inspector and contracts manager for a company whose revenues swelled after Congress passed legislation mandating continuous staffing of commercial shipboard radio stations. That same year, Marconi won a patent suit that gave it the coastal stations of the United Wireless Telegraph Company. Sarnoff also demonstrated the first use of radio on a railroad line, the Lackawanna Railroad Company's link between Binghamton, New York, and Scranton, Pennsylvania; and permitted and observed Edwin Armstrong's demonstration of his regenerative receiver at the Marconi station at Belmar, New Jersey. Sarnoff used H. J. Round's hydrogen arc transmitter to demonstrate the broadcast of music from the New York Wanamaker station.

This demonstration and the AT&T demonstrations in 1915 of long-distance wireless telephony inspired the first of many memos to his superiors on applications of current and future radio technologies. Sometime late in 1915 or in 1916 he proposed to the company's president, Edward J. Nally, that the company develop a "radio music box" for the "amateur" market of radio enthusiasts. Nally deferred on the proposal because of the expanded volume of business during World War I. Throughout the war years, Sarnoff remained Marconi's Commercial Manager, including oversight of the company's factory in Roselle Park, New Jersey.

== Business career ==
=== RCA ===
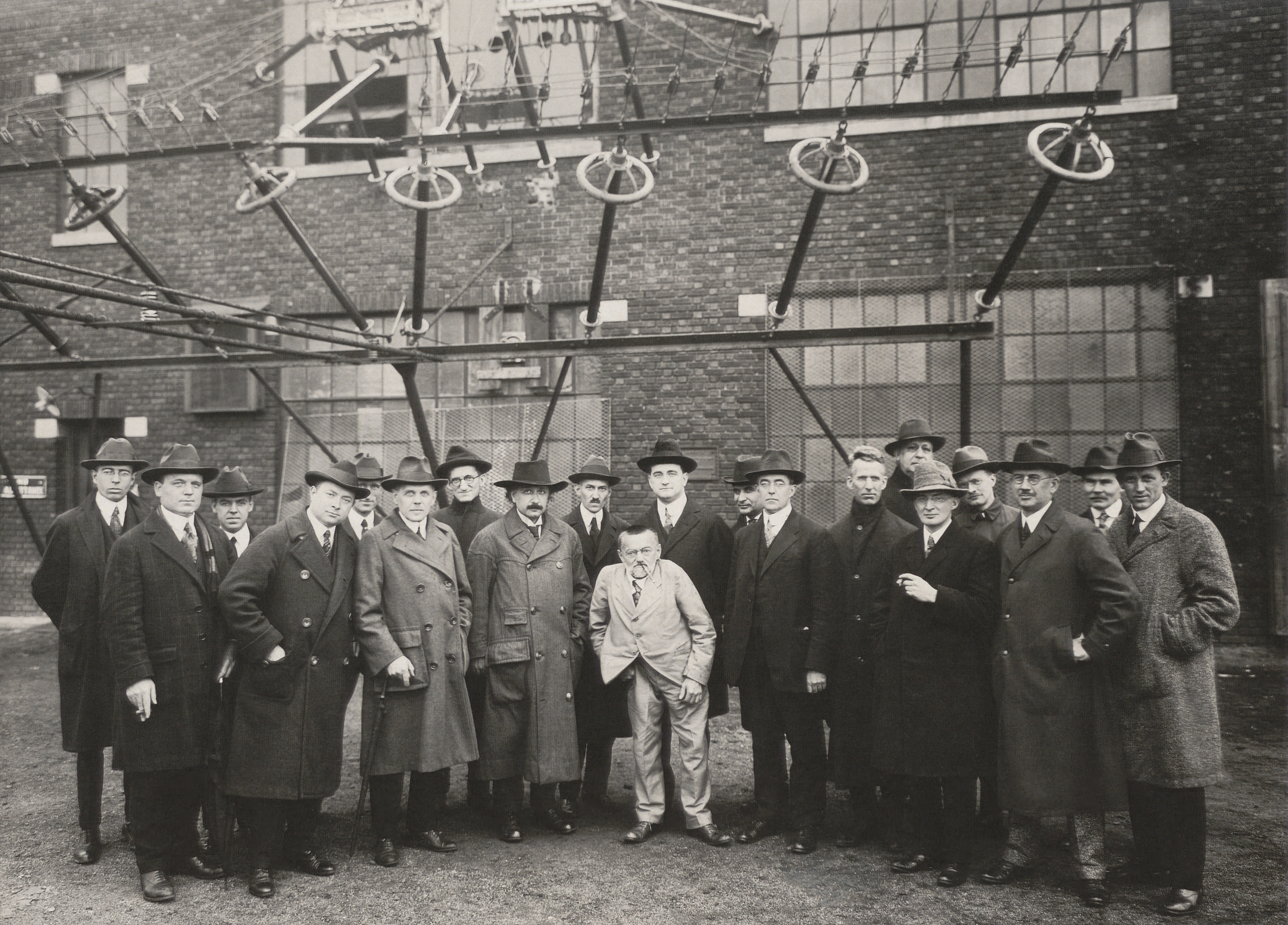
Sarnoff (front row; second from left) with Albert Einstein and other noted scientists and engineers on a tour of the RCA wireless station in New Brunswick, New Jersey in 1921. Charles Proteus Steinmetz is next to Einstein.

Unlike many who were involved with early radio communications, who often viewed radio as point-to-point, Sarnoff saw the potential of radio as point-to-mass. One person (the broadcaster) could speak to many (the listeners).

When Owen D. Young of General Electric arranged the purchase of American Marconi and reorganized it as the Radio Corporation of America, a radio patent monopoly, Sarnoff realized his dream and revived his proposal in a lengthy memo on the company's business and prospects. Although his superiors again ignored him, he contributed to the rising postwar radio boom by helping arrange for the broadcast of a heavyweight boxing match between Jack Dempsey and Georges Carpentier in July 1921, with Sarnoff as one of announcers. Up to 300,000 people listened to the broadcast of the fight, and demand for home radio equipment bloomed that winter. By the spring of 1922, Sarnoff's prediction of popular demand for radio broadcasting had come to pass and over the next few years, he gained much stature and influence.

In 1926, RCA purchased, from AT&T, its recently formed Broadcasting Company of America subsidiary, which included its New York City station, WEAF, and associated "WEAF Chain" network operations. This was reorganized to launch the National Broadcasting Company (NBC), the first national radio network in America. Four years later, Sarnoff became president of RCA. NBC had by that time split into two networks, the Red and the Blue. The Blue Network eventually became ABC Radio. Sarnoff is often inaccurately referred to as the founder of both RCA and NBC, but he was in fact founder of only NBC.

Sarnoff was instrumental in building and establishing the AM broadcasting radio business that became the preeminent public radio standard for the majority of the 20th century.

==== RCA Stock price manipulation ====
Via the Pecora Commission, congressional investigations revealed that when Sarnoff was in charge of the RCA, he participated in pool operations (market manipulation) of RCA stock. In one noted instance, Sarnoff used his wife as a proxy in order to try and hide his involvement in the operations, which were considered highly unethical even at the time. Using Sarnoff’s large sums of money, and that of other leading executives of the era, the pool started to artificially inflate the price of RCA stock on March 12, 1929 and concluded operations seven calendar days later. This short market manipulation netted the pool a gross profit of $5,563,198.48 ($105,198,447.02 in May 2025). Sarnoff’s actions, and similar ones of other leading executives at the time, led to public and congressional outcry and stricter securities-related regulations.

=== RKO ===
Sarnoff negotiated successful contracts to form Radio-Keith-Orpheum (RKO), a film production and distribution company. Essential elements in that new company were RCA, the Film Booking Offices of America (FBO), and the Keith-Albee-Orpheum (KAO) theater chain.

=== Early history of television ===
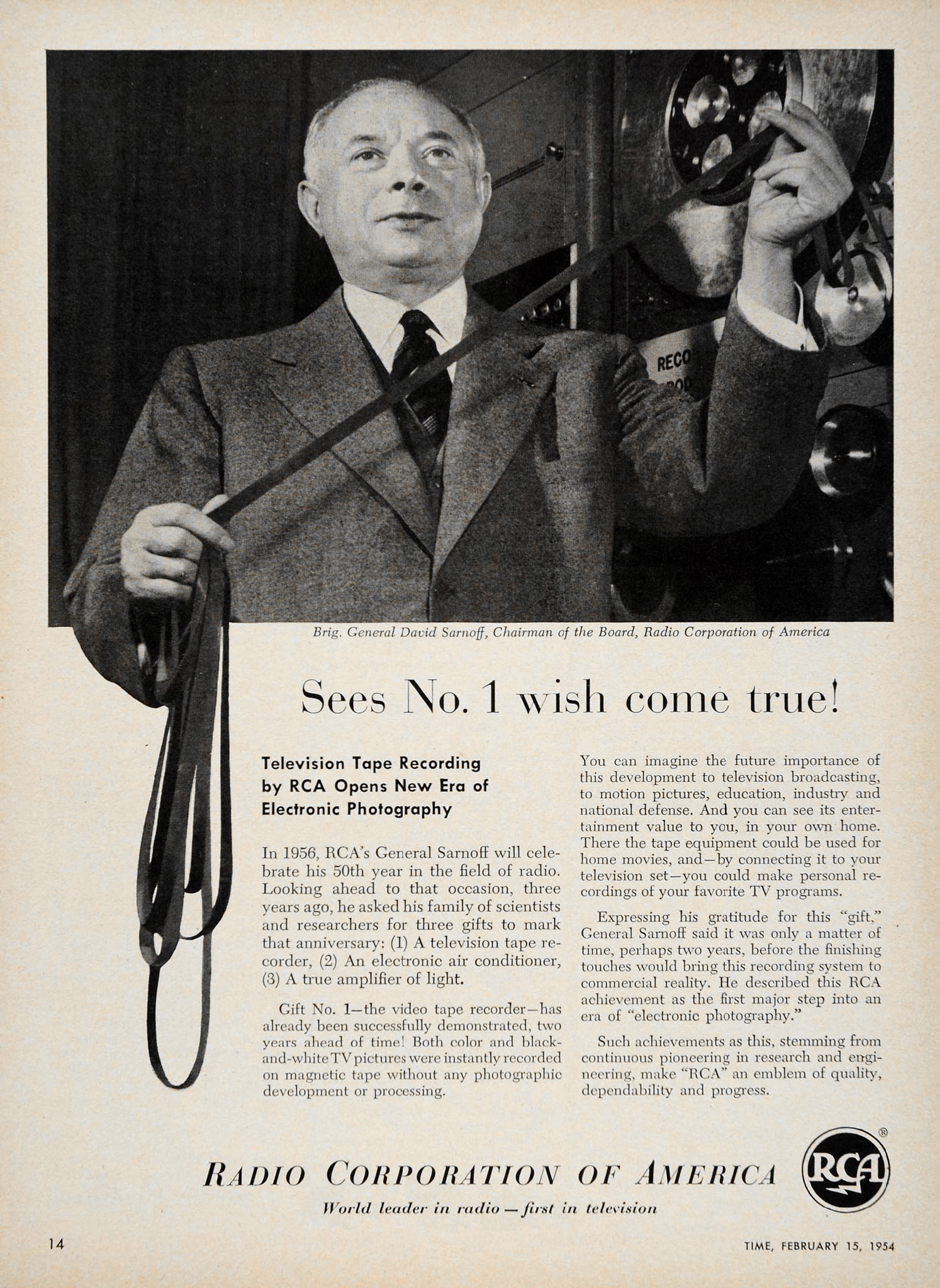
Sarnoff with the first RCA videotape recorder in 1954

When Sarnoff was put in charge of radio broadcasting at RCA, he soon recognized the potential for television, i.e., the combination of motion pictures with electronic transmission. Schemes for television had long been proposed (well before World War I) but with no practical outcome. Sarnoff was determined to lead his company in pioneering the medium and met with Westinghouse engineer Vladimir Zworykin in 1928. At the time Zworykin was attempting to develop an all-electronic television system at Westinghouse, but with little success. Zworykin had visited the laboratory of the inventor Philo T. Farnsworth, who had developed an Image Dissector, part of a system that could enable a working television. Zworykin was sufficiently impressed with Farnsworth's invention that he had his team at Westinghouse make several copies of the device for experimentation.

Zworykin pitched the concept to Sarnoff, claiming a viable television system could be realized in two years with a mere $100,000 investment. Sarnoff opted to fund Zworkyin's research, most likely well-aware that Zworykin was underestimating the scope of his television effort. Seven years later, in late 1935, Zworykin's photograph appeared on the cover of the trade journal Electronics, holding an early RCA photomultiplier prototype. The photomultiplier, subject of intensive research at RCA and in Leningrad, Russia, would become an essential component within sensitive television cameras. On April 24, 1936, RCA demonstrated to the press a working iconoscope camera tube and kinescope receiver display tube (an early cathode-ray tube), two key components of all-electronic television.

The final cost of the enterprise was closer to $50 million. On the road to success they encountered a legal battle with Farnsworth, who had been granted patents in 1930 for his solution to broadcasting moving pictures. Despite Sarnoff's efforts to prove that he was the inventor of the television, he was ordered to pay Farnsworth $1,000,000 in royalties, a small price to settle the dispute for an invention that would profoundly revolutionize the world. However this sum was never paid to Farnsworth.

In 1929, Sarnoff engineered the purchase of the Victor Talking Machine Company, the nation's largest manufacturer of gramophone records and phonographs, merging radio-phonograph production at Victor's large manufacturing facility in Camden, New Jersey. The acquisition became known as the RCA Victor Division, later RCA Records.

On January 3, 1930, Sarnoff became president of RCA, succeeding General James Harbord. On May 30, the company became involved in an antitrust case concerning the original radio patent pool. Sarnoff negotiated an outcome where RCA was no longer partially owned by Westinghouse and General Electric, giving him final say in the company's affairs.

Initially, the Great Depression of the early 1930s caused RCA to cut costs, but Zworykin's project was protected. After nine years of Zworykin's hard work, Sarnoff's determination, and legal battles with Farnsworth (in which Farnsworth was proved in the right), they had a commercial system ready to launch. Finally, in April 1939, regularly scheduled, electronic television in America was initiated by RCA under the name of their broadcasting division at the time, The National Broadcasting Company (NBC). The first television broadcast aired was the dedication of the RCA pavilion at the 1939 New York World's Fairgrounds and was introduced by Sarnoff himself. Later that month on April 30, opening day ceremonies at The World's Fair were telecast in the medium's first major production, featuring a speech by President Franklin D. Roosevelt, the first US president to appear on television. These telecasts were seen only in New York City and the immediate vicinity, since NBC television had only one station at the time, W2XBS Channel 1, now WNBC Channel 4. The broadcast was seen by an estimated 1,000 viewers from the roughly 200 television sets which existed in the New York City area at the time.

The standard approved by the National Television System Committee (the NTSC) in 1941 differed from RCA's standard, but RCA quickly became the market leader of manufactured sets and NBC became the first television network in the United States, connecting their New York City station to stations in Philadelphia and Schenectady for occasional programs in the early 1940s.

According to the book Global Communication Since 1844 by Peter J. Hughill, Sarnoff was part of a group of Russian Jewish scientists in the 1930s who wanted their research to advance military technology with the possibility of a forthcoming war with Germany. The account, credited to British government scientist Brian Callick, is supported by other contemporary evidence. The group, also comprising Simeon Aisenstein, Vladimir Zworykin and Isaac Shoenberg, knew each other well from Russia and saw possible military applications for their work on television. The group is said to have raised one million pounds sterling (about $5 million at the time) from US donors. The specific work took place at EMI-Marconi in the U.K. and resulted in Britain becoming significantly advanced in television development and able to launch a public service on 2 November 1936. The military applications helped the development of radio-location (later named radar). In addition the design and production in quantity of television equipment and sets allowed the similar military technology (cathode ray tubes, VHF transmission and reception and wideband circuits) to be advanced. A former British defence minister, Lord Orr-Ewing, referred to the work in a 1979 BBC interview and stated “that’s how we won the Battle of Britain”.

Meanwhile, a system developed by EMI based on Russian research and Zworykin's work was adopted in the United Kingdom and the BBC had a regular television service from 1936 onwards. However, World War II put a halt to a dynamic growth of the early television development stages.

=== World War II ===
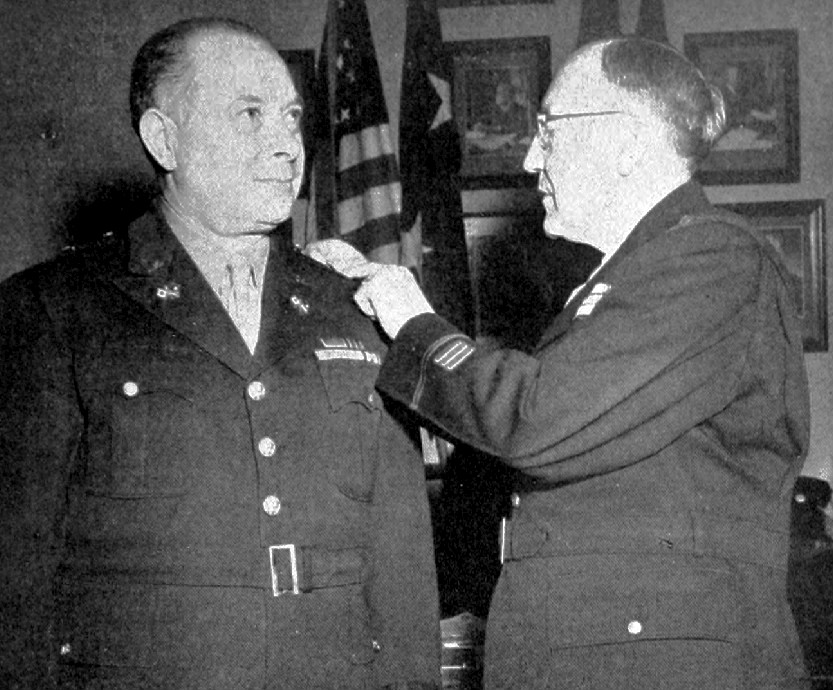
Sarnoff receiving his brigadier general's star from Major General Harry C. Ingles, chief signal officer of the US Army.

At the onset of World War II, Sarnoff served on Eisenhower's communications staff, arranging expanded radio circuits for NBC to transmit news from the invasion of France in June 1944. In France, Sarnoff arranged for the restoration of the Radio France station in Paris that the Germans destroyed and oversaw the construction of a radio transmitter powerful enough to reach all of the allied forces in Europe, called Radio Free Europe. In recognition of his achievements, Sarnoff was decorated with the Legion of Merit on October 11, 1944.

Thanks to his communications skills and support he received the Brigadier General's star in December 1945, and thereafter was known as "General Sarnoff." The star, which he proudly and frequently wore, was buried with him.

Sarnoff anticipated that post-war America would need an international radio voice explaining its policies and positions. In 1943, he tried to influence Secretary of State Cordell Hull to include radio broadcasting in post-war planning. In 1947, he lobbied Secretary of State George Marshall to expand the roles of Radio Free Europe and Voice of America. His concerns and proposed solutions were eventually seen as prescient. In 1947, he became chairman of RCA.

=== Post-war expansion ===
After the war, monochrome TV production began in earnest. Color TV was the next major development, and NBC once again won the battle. CBS had their electro-mechanical color television system approved by the FCC on October 10, 1950, but Sarnoff filed an unsuccessful suit in the United States district court to suspend that ruling. Subsequently, he made an appeal to the Supreme Court which eventually upheld the FCC decision. Sarnoff's tenacity and determination to win the "Color War" pushed his engineers to perfect an all-electronic color television system that used a signal that could be received on existing monochrome sets that prevailed. CBS was now unable to take advantage of the color market, due to lack of manufacturing capability and color programming, a system that could not be seen on the millions of black and white receivers and sets that were triple the cost of monochrome sets. A few days after CBS had its color premiere on June 14, 1951, RCA demonstrated a fully functional all-electronic color TV system and became the leading manufacturer of color TV sets in the US.

CBS system color TV production was suspended in October 1951 for the duration of the Korean War. As more people bought monochrome sets, it was increasingly unlikely that CBS could achieve any success with its incompatible system. Few receivers were sold, and there were almost no color broadcasts, especially in prime time, when CBS could not run the risk of broadcasting a program which few could see. The NTSC was reformed and recommended a system virtually identical to RCA's in August 1952. On December 17, 1953, the FCC approved RCA's system as the new standard.

=== Later years ===
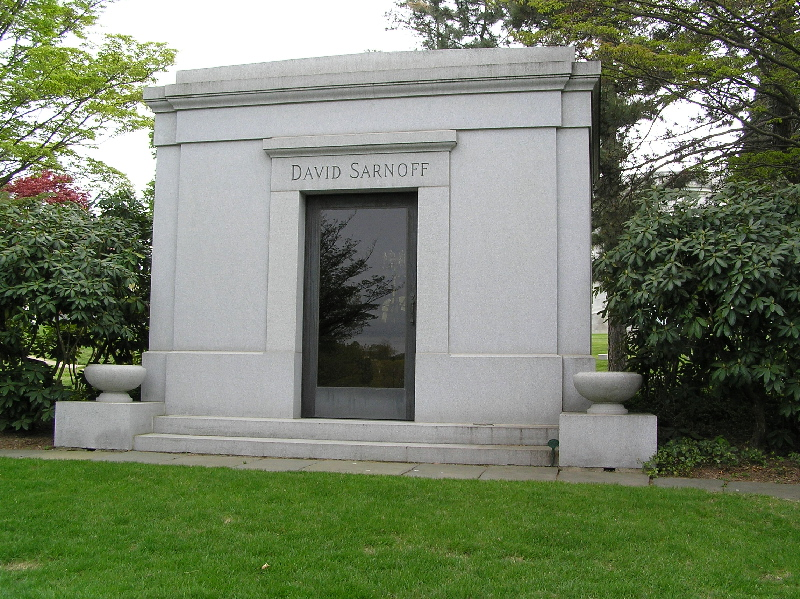
Sarnoff's mausoleum at Kensico Cemetery.

In 1955, Sarnoff received The Hundred Year Association of New York's Gold Medal Award "in recognition of outstanding contributions to the City of New York."

In 1959, Sarnoff was a member of the Rockefeller Brothers Fund panel to report on U.S. foreign policy. As a member of that panel and in a subsequent essay published in Life as part of its "The National Purpose" series, he was critical of the tentative stand being taken by the United States in fighting the political and psychological warfare being waged by Soviet-led international Communism against the West. He strongly advocated an aggressive, multi-faceted fight in the ideological and political realms with a determination to decisively win the Cold War. In 1966, David's son Robert was named president and chief operating officer of RCA and two years later also became chief executive officer.

Sarnoff retired in 1970, at the age of 79 and died the following year, aged 80. He is interred in a mausoleum featuring a stained-glass vacuum tube in Kensico Cemetery in Valhalla, New York. Robert succeeded him as chairman of RCA.

After his death, Sarnoff left behind an estate estimated to be worth over $1 million. The majority of the estate went to his widow, Lizette Hermant Sarnoff, who received $300,000, personal and household effects in addition to the Sarnoff home, located on 44 East 71st Street.

== Family life ==
On July 4, 1917, Sarnoff married Lizette Hermant, the daughter of a French immigrant family of Jewish descent who settled in the Bronx as one of his family's neighbors. The Museum of Broadcast Communications describes their 54-year marriage as the bedrock of his life. Lizette was often the first person to hear her husband's new ideas as radio and television became integral to American home life.

The couple had three sons. Eldest son Robert W. Sarnoff (1918–1997) succeeded his father at the helm of RCA in 1970. Robert's third wife was operatic soprano Anna Moffo. Edward Sarnoff, the middle child, headed Fleet Services of New York. Thomas W. Sarnoff, the youngest, was NBC's West Coast President.

Sarnoff was the maternal uncle of screenwriter Richard Baer. Sarnoff was credited with sparking Baer's interest in television. According to Baer's 2005 autobiography, Sarnoff called a vice president at NBC at 6 A.M. and ordered him to find Baer "a job by 9 o'clock" that same morning. The NBC vice president complied with Sarnoff's request.

David Sarnoff was initiated to the Scottish Rite Freemasonry in the Renovation Lodge No. 97, Albion, NY.

== Honors ==
- In 1938, he received an honorary degree Doctor of Commercial Science from Oglethorpe University.
- He was an honorary member of Omicron Alpha Tau
- Knight of the Cross of Lorraine (France), 1951.
- Companion of the Resistance (France), 1951.
- Legion of Merit from the United States Army, 1944.
- Sarnoff was inducted into the Junior Achievement US Business Hall of Fame in 1975.
- Sarnoff was the winner of the National Association of Broadcasters Hall of Fame Distinguished Service Award in 1953.
- Sarnoff was posthumously inducted into the Television Hall of Fame in 1984.
- Sarnoff was posthumously inducted into the Radio Hall of Fame in 1989.
- Sarnoff was posthumously inducted into the New Jersey Hall of Fame in 2014.

== Sarnoff museum ==
The David Sarnoff Library, a library and museum open to the public containing many historical items from David Sarnoff's life was in Princeton Junction, NJ. The David Sarnoff Library now exists as a virtual museum online. When the Library was operating, The David Sarnoff Radio Club composed of local amateur radio operators used to meet there, as did the New Jersey Antique Radio Club and other community organizations. The exhibits are now on display in Roscoe L. West Hall at The College of New Jersey.

== Sarnoff's Law ==
In 1999, computer scientist David P. Reed coined Sarnoff's Law, which states that "the value of a network grows in proportion to the number of viewers." Sarnoff's Law, Metcalfe's Law and Reed's Law are frequently used in tandem in discussions of the value of networks.

== Portrayals ==
- Geoff Dunsworth (2012) - Titanic: The Aftermath (Documentary)

== See also ==
- Empire of the Air: The Men Who Made Radio
- Sarnoff Corporation, the eponymous successor organization to RCA Laboratories following the 1986 acquisition of RCA by General Electric.
- Metcalfe's law: the value of a communication network is proportional to the square of the number of users. By comparison, Sarnoff's law is linear.
