= Evan Schwartz (author) =

American writer and film producer

Evan I. Schwartz is an American author who writes about history, innovation, tech, music, and media.

He has written five non-fiction books, including The Last Lone Inventor: A Tale of Genius, Deceit, and the Birth of Television, the story of inventor Philo Farnsworth and his epic battle with RCA tycoon David Sarnoff, named by Amazon Books as one of "100 Biographies & Memoirs to Read in a Lifetime," and included on Fortune's list of "75 Smartest Business Books We Know."

Schwartz is also the author of Finding Oz: How L. Frank Baum Discovered the Great American Story, a narrative about the origins of a cultural icon, The Wizard of Oz. In 2021, PBS American Experience aired American Oz, a documentary that featured him and the book.

In April 2007, NOVA premiered "Saved By the Sun", a documentary about the unlimited potential of solar energy in an age of climate change, co-written and produced by Schwartz.

Schwartz is a former editor at BusinessWeek and MIT's Technology Review. In 2008, he served as a member of the Alfred P. Sloan Feature Film Prize jury at the Sundance Film Festival.

From 2011 to 2019, Schwartz was Director of Storytelling at Innosight, where he co-authored a study on the world's most transformative companies. From 2020 to 2023, he served as a team member and storyteller for Speed & Scale: An Action Plan for Solving Our Climate Crisis Now by John Doerr (Penguin/Portfolio, 2021).

His feature in WIRED about space junk was selected for the 2011 Best American Science and Nature Writing series. Schwartz holds a Bachelor of Science from Union College, in Schenectady, N.Y.

== Books ==
- Webonomics (Broadway Books, 1997)
- Digital Darwinism. Broadway Books. 1999. ISBN 0767903331.
- The Last Lone Inventor: A Tale of Genius, Deceit, and the Birth of Television (HarperCollins, 2002)
- Juice: The Creative Fuel that Drives World Class Inventors (Harvard Business Press, 2004)
- Finding Oz (Houghton Mifflin Harcourt, 2009)
