= Stanley Silverstein =

American businessman

- Born: Stanley Oscar Silverstein; December 24, 1924; Vilna, Poland
- Died: October 20, 2016 (aged 91); Manhasset, New York
- Occupation(s): Co-founder, Nina Footwear
- Known for: Shoe designer

Stanley Oscar Silverstein (December 24, 1924 – October 20, 2016) was a Lithuanian-born American entrepreneur who was co-founder with his brother Mike of Nina Footwear, a company that manufactures "fashionable but affordable shoes" for women. Silverstein's 1962 design of a ballerina flat won industry recognition. Since its founding in the 1950s, the company has sold more than 250 million pairs of shoes in 20 countries.

== Personal life ==
Born in Vilna (now Vilnius, Lithuania) on December 24, 1924, Silverstein moved to Havana, Cuba, with his family as a child, where he attended high school. During World War II, Silverstein served in the United States Army after attending the University of Havana.

A resident of Kings Point, New York, Silverstein was one of the initiators of the Silverstein Hebrew Academy in Great Neck. He died in nearby Manhasset on October 20, 2016. He was survived by his wife, Raine, and by his four daughters, most of whom were involved with design and management for the family business.

== Business career ==
After working in New York City as a diamond cutter after completing his military service, Silverstein returned to Cuba and began working at his father's shoe factory, which manufactured wooden platform shoes. Returning to the United States, Silverstein and his brother Mike worked in handbag manufacturing. Silverstein co-founded the company now known as Nina Footwear with his brother Mike in 1953, naming the company after his oldest daughter. Their first store was located on Prince Street in the Little Italy neighborhood of Manhattan in New York City. His brother and company co-founder, Mike Silverstein focused on sales, while Stanley's "strengths and abilities were always in design and manufacturing".

Silverstein's design of a ballerina flat, which was created using "leftover scraps of leather", was recognized by the Leather Industries of America with its American Shoe Designer Award in 1963. The privately held company has accumulated sales of 250 million pairs of shoes for women and children, including million sellers designed by Silverstein for a women's clog and a kidskin flat shoe. By 2012, the company's annual sales were estimated at $150 million. His daughter, Nina Miner, who was the company's namesake and served as chief creative officer of the family business, described her father's creative input and involvement in design continuing while approaching the age of 92.

His brother Mike died in March 2012. In December 2012, Renee Silverstein, widow of company co-founder Mike Silverstein, filed suit against her brother-in-law whom she claimed had failed to meet the terms of an agreement reached between the two co-founders in 2007 under which the equivalent of 30 months of salary would be paid to the survivor of whichever partner died first, an amount that she said in her lawsuit would total $1 million.
