= Pool operation =

Market manipulation tactic

A pool operation is a form of market manipulation that artificially and temporarily changes the price of a security’s shares in order to secure the pool's participants with a profit.

Pool operations may deploy overlapping, but not the same exact, tactics as other forms of market manipulation, such as boiler room operations.

Pool operations contributed to the Wall Street crash of 1929 and were the subject of multiple congressional hearings and investigations, including the Pujo Committee and the Pecora Commission. The existence of pool operations led to securities-related legislative and regulatory changes that arose in the 1930s, including the Securities Exchange Act of 1934.

Traditional and newer versions of pool operations continue to exist to this day in North America and Asia.

== Basics of pool operations ==
In market manipulation, a pool operation refers to a planned attempt by several individuals (the “pool”) to artificially alter the price of a security towards a target price. The pool’s incipient intent is to temporarily simulate organic public demand for a security when, in fact, it is a relatively small number of individuals, brokers, and other market professionals who are largely driving the price of the security at the outset of the operation. The alteration in price typically occurs in the absence of any fundamental changes that would otherwise justify the change in price or the target price. When the pool operation’s price objective is reached, the pool disposes of its holdings onto the market. This often causes the security's price to decline. The decline in price occurs due to a combination of factors including the pool's selling pressure, withdrawal of the pool's own demand for the stock, compounded by the trading public's reaction to any negative media attention related to the price decline itself. Ultimately, the pool operation's intent is to secure the pool with profits while leaving its trading counterparties with equally large losses.

Due to numerous factors, pool operations are not always successful but, when they are, can result in millions of dollars of profit in as little as several days’ worth of trading activity.

== Pool participants ==
According to congressional investigations, the pool’s participants are often wealthy individuals who “pool” their money together in order to use the mechanics of supply and demand to manipulate the price of a moderately or very popular security. Such a security is also often more “liquid”, which means it is easier to dispose of one’s shares at a better price. However smaller, lower-priced, and often less liquid securities can be manipulated by less-wealthy groups of individuals or by smaller funds.

== Price and media manipulation ==
Pool operations employ price manipulation and media manipulation.

Pool operations often seek to raise, as opposed to lower, the price of a security as the broader trading public is familiar with purchasing a security as opposed to shorting a security.

Pool participants combine their funds and utilize one or more brokers and other market means to purchase the security's stock in large amounts. Along with other methods that simulate market demand, these actions create artificial activity that ultimately raises the security's price. A rising stock price can attract public attention and induce the public to buy the rising stock, a financial phenomenon that relies on crowd psychology, including fear of missing out. A rising price can attract media attention without the need for media manipulation. This natural media attention may lead to broader public interest in purchasing the stock.

Pool operators manipulate the media more explicitly. This manipulation involves the insertion of positive security-related content into media information outlets. Mechanisms of media manipulation have included paying reporters, journalists, analysts, researchers, brokers, public figures, and other types of influencers to promote the security. In the absence of payment, pool operators have provided such media figures with exaggerated or false tips, rumors, or other information designed to generate a positive appearance around the security.

It was not unusual for pools to bribe journalists in the leading newspapers, such as the Wall Street Journal. According to investigations, the editors and owners of such media outlets were unaware that the reporter was paid to showcase falsely favorable pieces of information.

As regulators and leading national media outlets became aware of such pool tactics, the pools switched to manipulating local media or spreading rumors through other grassroots mechanisms. The manipulation of local media would, over a longer period of time, spread positive rumors about a stock. These rumors would eventually get noticed by regional and then national media in a more organic fashion, making it appear that no manipulation of the media took place.

== Examples of pool operations and participants ==
In 2013, the FBI uncovered a pool operation whereby 14 individuals artificially changed the price of stocks using price and media manipulation, resulting in $30 million worth of losses for over 20,000 individuals. Pamela Anderson, who was unaware that she was used as part of the pool's media-related manipulation campaign, was paid to promote a publicly-traded security that the pool was operating in.

David Sarnoff, as head of RCA, used his housewife as a proxy in a pool operation on March 12, 1929. In 7 calendar days, the pool operation raised the price of RCA stock and grossed a profit of over $105,000,000 (in 2025 USD).

Other individuals who participated in pool operations included: William C. Durant, Walter Chrysler, and Charles M. Schwab.
