= The Magazine of Wall Street =

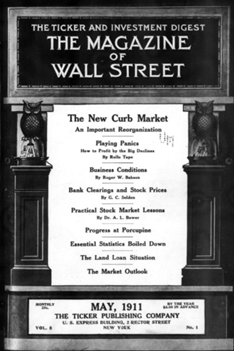
The first edition of The Magazine of Wall Street

The Magazine of Wall Street — originally called The Ticker — was an American financial news magazine, and the world's largest financial publication of its heyday (the mid Progressive Era and Roaring Twenties). The magazine ran from 1907 to 1972.

== History ==
The Ticker, of The Ticker Publishing Co. was founded and originally owned by Richard D. Wyckoff, a well-publicized financial media author, speculator, and publisher of the early 20th century.

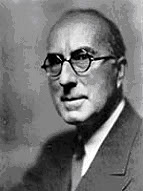
Richard D. Wyckoff.

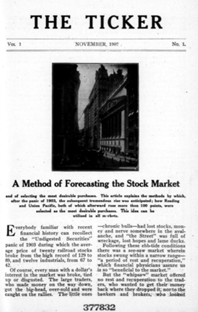
The first edition of The Ticker

The first, November, issue appeared on October 1, 1907 and the magazine was initially priced at $3 a year, or $0.25 a copy. Wyckoff served as the initial editor from the first issue and for a number of years thereafter; he retained the role until October 1926 but only nominally so in the later part of his editorial role therein.

Its circulation was 68,228 subscribers in 1927, exceeding that of The Wall Street Journal’s around the same time—and, prior to 1920, its distribution equaled the combined yearly circulation of all other contemporary financial publications. Around the time of the Wall street crash of 1929, the magazine was valued between $39,000,000 to $117,000,000 (in 2026 USD) and employed 200 people.

The Ticker was rebranded as The Magazine of Wall Street starting with the May, 1911 issue.

Over the course of the 1910s, Wyckoff lost control of 99% of the magazine to his then-wife, Cecilia Shere. In divorce and sale-related proceedings in the mid-to-late 1920s, Wyckoff was forced to sell the rest of the magazine on May 26, 1926 to Shere, who by then had been de-facto editor, publisher, and owner of the magazine-company for quite some time. While Wyckoff held on to a nominal editorial role and salary by the time of the divorce, he was quickly fired by Shere once she gained full control. The sale, and other divorce proceedings, were acrimonious and went so far as to reach the New York Supreme Court; leaving Wyckoff in a difficult financial and personal state thereafter.

Shere would go on to write for the magazine, under the pseudonym "Charles Benedict" (Wyckoff's father's name) and remained at its helm until her death in 1966.

The magazine entered a decline around the time of the Great Depression, rejected a sale to Gilbert Kaplan in the 1960s, rebranded to the Magazine of Wall Street and Business Analyst, and ceased publication by February 1972.

== Notability ==
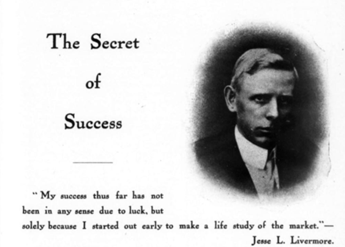
Jesse Livermore's feature in The Ticker

As a result of its quick prominence, the magazine featured interviews with, and (often numerous) articles written by, some of the most famous market-related individuals of its era, including Jesse Livermore, Irving Fisher, Frank A. Vanderlip, J.W. Harriman, Roger W. Babson, and Edward H.H. Simmons. Some of them, like Irving Fisher, would become regular contributors. Wyckoff, himself a well-known financial author and investment guru of his era, often wrote in the magazine under his pen name “Rollo Tape” in its earliest issues as well.

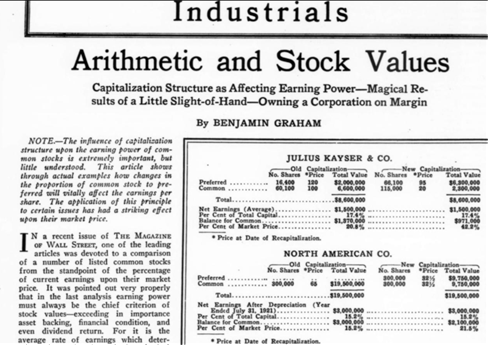
Benjamin Graham's column in the magazine.

The magazine also featured the works of then little-known authors who would go on to make a name for themselves in the then-emerging fields of value investing, macro investing, trading the news, investor psychology, quantitative finance, technical analysis, and other forms of analyzing and trading market information. This included William Delbert Gann and Benjamin Graham, the "father" of value investing, who honed his thoughts on, and skill in, value investing while writing for the magazine. For example, Graham revealed his method for determining the value of a company's goodwill in the magazine. Graham impressed Wyckoff so much that Graham became a regular columnist and was offered an attractive salary to become the magazine's editor, an offer that Graham's regular employer successfully countered.

Another then-anonymous employee was Joseph Hirshhorn who, at a young age, managed to convince Wyckoff to be a chartist at the magazine.

Famously, the magazine was one of the few leading financial publications that maintained, weeks before the Great Crash, a bullish market view and continued to maintain that optimistic view well into 1930.

== Legacy ==
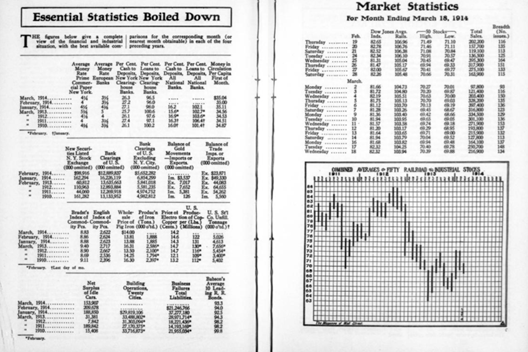
An example of the extensive and detailed data and charts.

Across the evolving fields of economics, investing, monetary policy, and finance, the magazine analyzed business conditions, stocks, bonds, commodities, and other securities. It featured news columns, opinion pieces, deeper analyses, detailed tables and charts, as well as broader economic, business, and financial data that would later become standard across financial periodicals and premium market data providers, such as Bloomberg Terminal. Due to the breadth, depth, and historical length of this information, researchers still rely on it for historical purposes.
