= Searingtown, New York =

- Hamlet and census-designated place
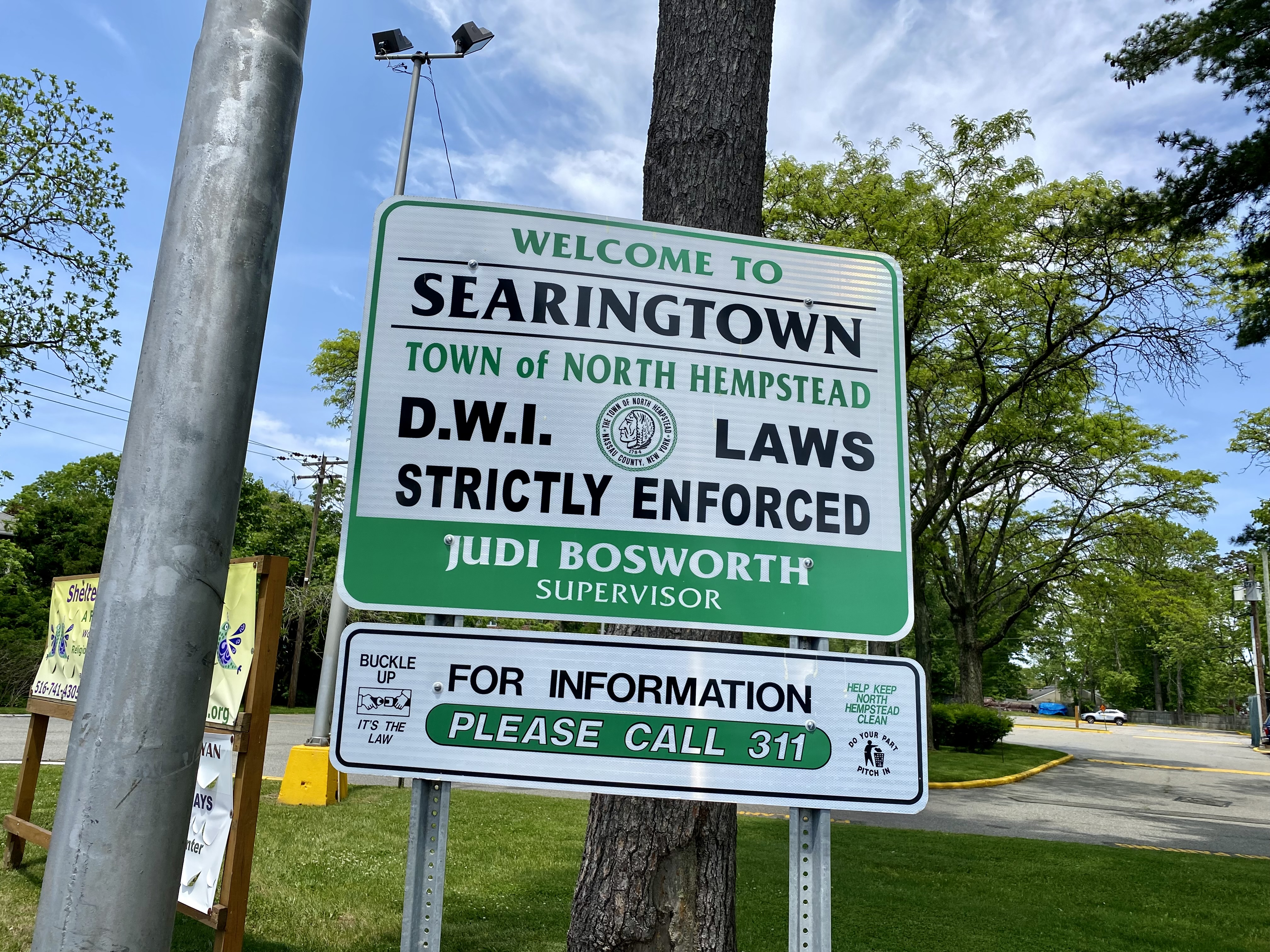
- A welcome sign to Searingtown in 2021

- Location in Nassau County and the state of New York

- Location on Long Island Location within the state of New York
- Coordinates: 40°46′21″N 73°39′30″W
- Country: United States
- State: New York
- County: Nassau
- Town: North Hempstead
- Named for: The Searing family

Area
  - Total: 0.93 sq mi (2.41 km^{2})
  - Land: 0.93 sq mi (2.41 km^{2})
  - Water: 0 sq mi (0.00 km^{2})
- Elevation: 128 ft (39 m)

Population (2020)
  - Total: 5,044
  - Density: 5,413.5/sq mi (2,090.15/km^{2})
- Time zone: UTC-5 (Eastern (EST))
  - Summer (DST): UTC-4 (EDT)
- ZIP Codes: 11507 (Albertson); 11576 (Roslyn); 11577 (Roslyn Heights)
- Area codes: 516, 363
- FIPS code: 36-66102
- GNIS feature ID: 0964742

Searingtown is a hamlet and census-designated place (CDP) located within the Town of North Hempstead in Nassau County, on Long Island, in New York, United States. The population was 5,044 at the time of the 2020 census.

== History ==
One of the earliest settlers in the area was named John Searing. The name of the hamlet became Searingtown in the mid-18th Century; the Searing family was the area's principal owner of land at the time.

The Searingtown Methodist Church first opened on I.U. Willets Road (formerly Westbury Road) in 1788. Parts of the original structure are still part of the church. The building still stands in the same place but it is technically now in Albertson.

== Geography ==
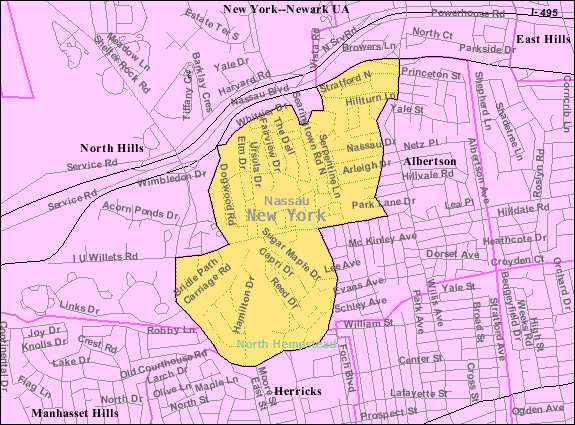
U.S. Census map of Searingtown

According to the United States Census Bureau, the CDP has a total area of 0.9 square miles (2.3 km^{2}), all land.

== Demographics ==
Historical population
Census	Pop.	Note	%±
2000	5,034		—
2010	4,915		−2.4%
2020	5,044		2.6%
U.S. Decennial Census

As of the census of 2000, there were 5,034 people, 1,582 households, and 1,430 families residing in the CDP. The population density was 5,473.4 inhabitants per square mile (2,113.3/km^{2}). There were 1,606 housing units at an average density of 1,746.2 per square mile (674.2/km^{2}). The racial makeup of the CDP was 69.77% White, 0.99% African American, 0.10% Native American, 25.86% Asian, 0.70% from other races, and 2.58% from two or more races. Hispanic or Latino of any race were 2.86% of the population.

There were 1,582 households, out of which 41.9% had children under the age of 18 living with them, 83.1% were married couples living together, 5.3% had a female householder with no husband present, and 9.6% were non-families. 8.7% of all households were made up of individuals, and 6.0% had someone living alone who was 65 years of age or older. The average household size was 3.18 and the average family size was 3.37.

In the CDP, the population was spread out, with 26.8% under the age of 18, 6.2% from 18 to 24, 21.8% from 25 to 44, 29.0% from 45 to 64, and 16.2% who were 65 years of age or older. The median age was 42 years. For every 100 females, there were 94.6 males. For every 100 females age 18 and over, there were 90.2 males.

The median income for a household in the CDP was $120,546, and the median income for a family was $126,182. Males had a median income of $92,834 versus $51,995 for females. The per capita income for the CDP was $49,113. About 1.1% of families and 1.1% of the population were below the poverty line, including 1.0% of those under age 18 and 2.1% of those age 65 or over.

== Government ==
=== Town representation ===
As Searingtown is an unincorporated part of the Town of North Hempstead, it is directly governed by the town's government in Manhasset.

Searingtown is located within the Town of North Hempstead's 2nd council district, which as of August 2024 is represented on the North Hempstead Town Council by Edward Scott (R–Albertson).

=== Representation in higher government ===
==== Nassau County representation ====
Searingtown is located in Nassau County's 18th Legislative district, which as of August 2024 is represented in the Nassau County Legislature by Samantha A. Goetz (R–Locust Valley).

==== New York State representation ====
===== New York State Assembly =====
Searingtown is located in the New York State Assembly's 16th State Assembly district, which as of August 2024 is represented by Gina L. Sillitti (D–Manorhaven).

===== New York State Senate =====
Searingtown is located in the New York State Senate's 7th State Senate district, which as of August 2024 is represented by Jack M. Martins (R–Mineola).

==== Federal representation ====
===== United States Congress =====
Searingtown is located entirely within New York's 3rd Congressional district, which as of August 2024 is represented in the United States Congress by Thomas R. Suozzi (D–Glen Cove).

===== United States Senate =====
Like the rest of New York, Searingtown is represented in the United States Senate by Charles Schumer (D) and Kirsten Gillibrand (D).

=== Politics ===
In the 2016 U.S. presidential election, the majority of Searingtown voters voted for Hillary Clinton (D).

== Education ==
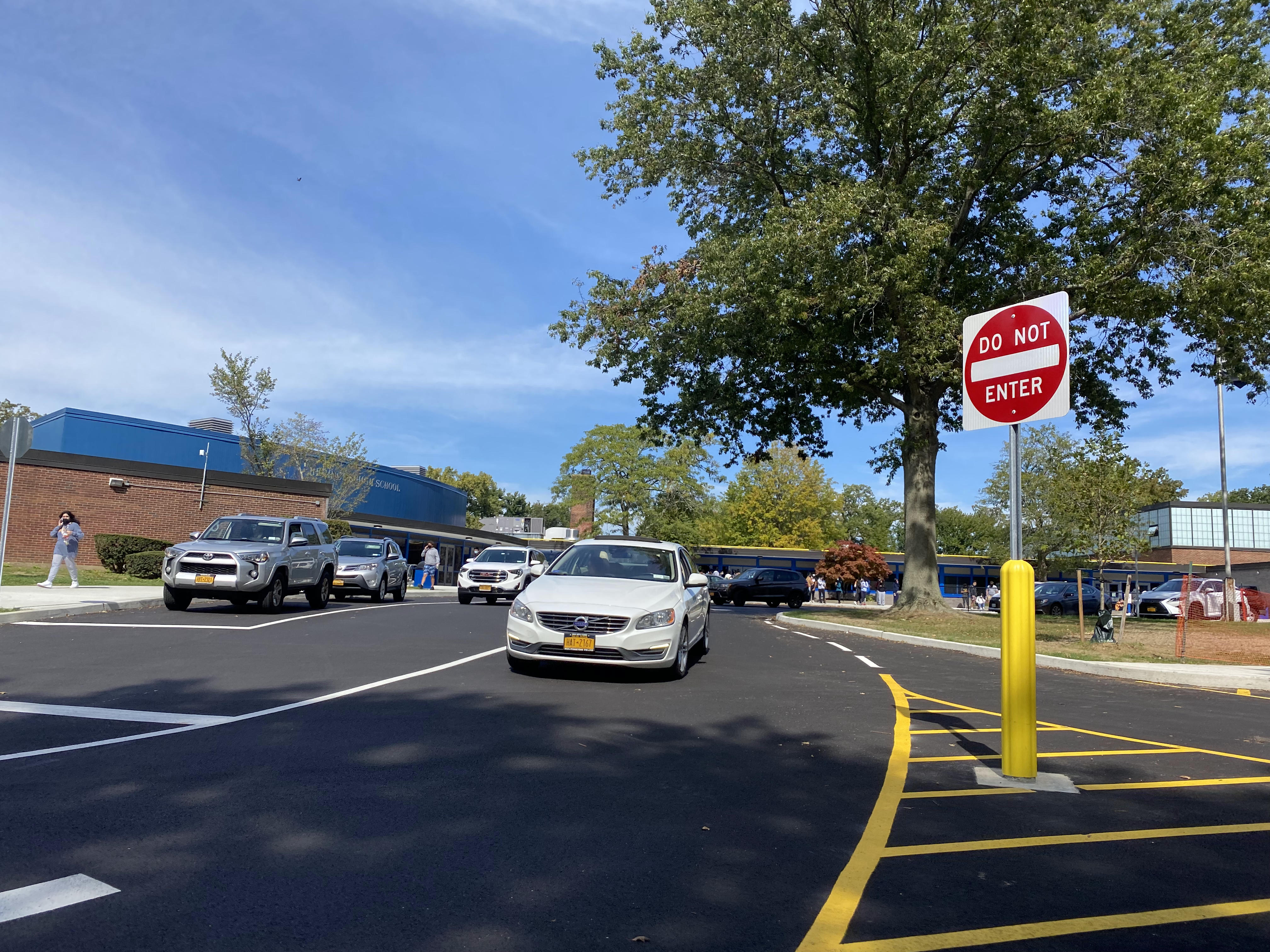
Herricks High School in 2021

Searingtown is served by the Herricks Union Free School District. As such, all children who reside within the hamlet and attend public schools go to that district's schools. Furthermore, three of the district's schools are located within the hamlet: Herricks High School, Herricks Middle School, and Searingtown Elementary School.

Additionally, the Henry Viscardi School is located within Searingtown. This state-supported special school private school serves children with disabilities.

== Infrastructure ==
=== Transportation ===
==== Road ====
A small portion of the Northern State Parkway forms much of the northern border of Searingtown; the historic Long Island Motor Parkway used to pass through the hamlet, as well.

Other major roads which travel through Searingtown include I.U. Willets Road, Searingtown Road, Shelter Rock Road, and Willis Avenue.

==== Rail ====
No rail lines pass through Searingtown. The nearest Long Island Rail Road stations to the hamlet are Manhasset on the Port Washington Branch, New Hyde Park on the Main Line and Albertson on the Oyster Bay Branch.

==== Bus ====
The n23 bus route runs along Willis Avenue at the eastern edge of Searingtown. This bus line is operated by Nassau Inter-County Express (NICE).

=== Utilities ===
==== Natural gas ====
National Grid USA provides natural gas to homes and businesses that are hooked up to natural gas lines in Searingtown.

==== Power ====
PSEG Long Island provides power to all homes and businesses within Searingtown.

The former Long Island Motor Parkway's right-of-way now serves as the route of a power line through the area.

==== Sewage ====
All of Searingtown is connected to sanitary sewers, which are part of the Nassau County Sewage District, which handles and treats the hamlet's sanitary waste.

==== Water ====
Searingtown is primarily located within the boundaries of (and is thus served by) the Albertson Water District. However, much of the southern part of the hamlet is located within the boundaries of (and is thus served by) the Garden City Park Water District.

== See also ==
- List of Census-designated places in New York
- Herricks, New York
