= I.U. Willets Road =

Road on Long Island, New York

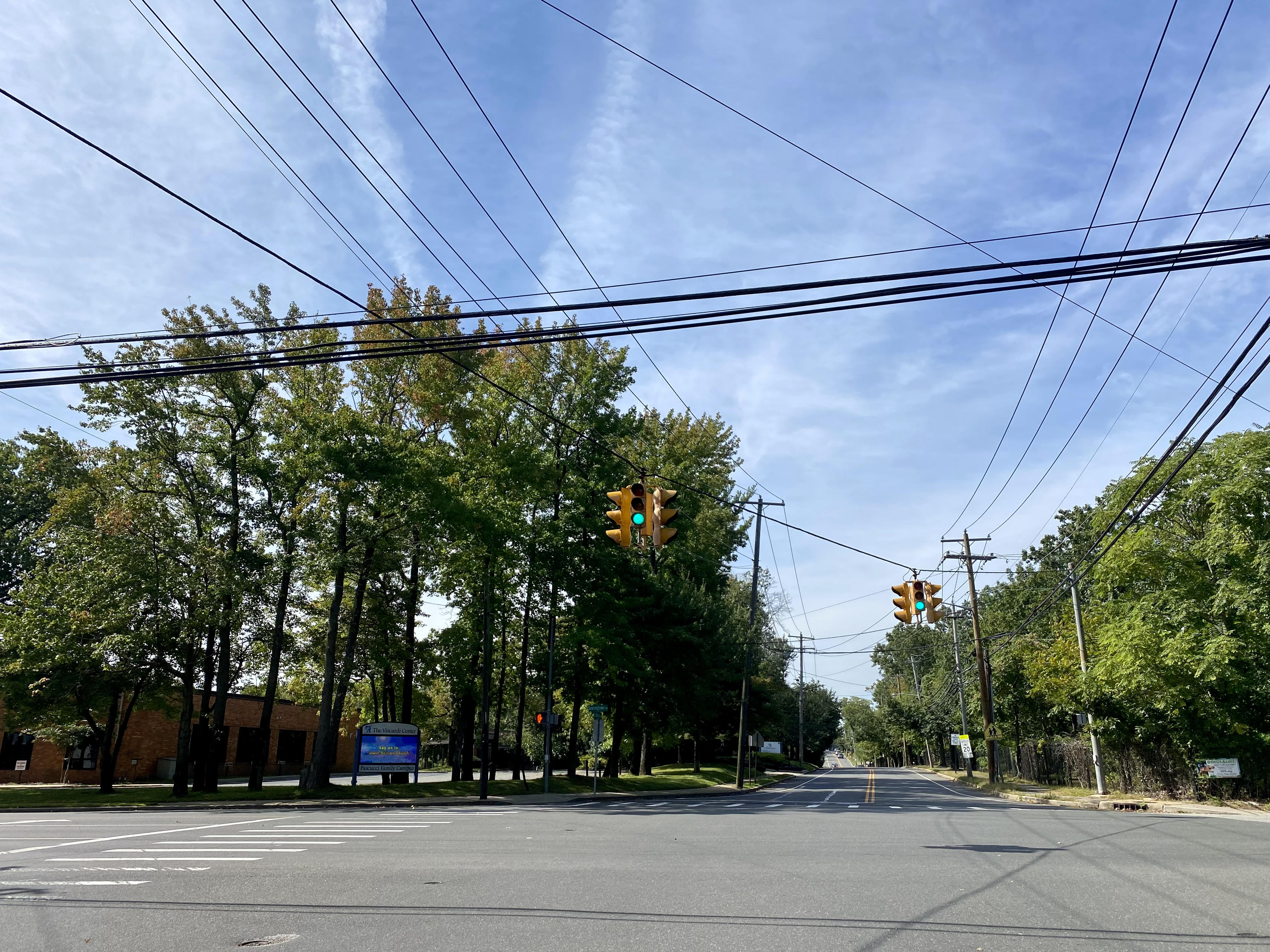
- I.U. Willets Road at Searingtown Road in 2021, looking west
- Former name: Westbury Road
- Type: Minor Arterial
- Maintained by: NCDPW and TONH (east of Shelter Rock Road); private (west of Shelter Rock Road)
- Length: 3.69 mi (5.94 km) (east of Shelter Rock Road)
- East end: Old Westbury Road in Old Westbury
- West end: Dead-end in North Hills

Construction
- Completion: c. 1870

I.U. Willets Road (historically known as Westbury Road and Albertson Station Road) is a major west–east road between the Villages of North Hills and Old Westbury in the Town of North Hempstead, in Nassau County, on the North Shore of Long Island, in New York, United States.

== Description ==
I.U. Willets Road begins in the Village of North Hills and travels east to Old Westbury Road in the Village of Old Westbury, serving as a major west–east link in central North Hempstead. The portion of the road in North Hills east of Shelter Rock Road (CR 8) – in addition to the portion located within Old Westbury – are owned and maintained by Nassau County and designated as Nassau County Route D24. The portion west of Shelter Rock Road is privately owned, and the section from the North Hills–Searingtown border to the Roslyn Heights–Old Westbury border is owned and maintained by the Town of North Hempstead.

The portion of I.U. Willets Road between Shelter Rock Road (CR 8) and Glen Cove Road (CR 1) is classified as a minor arterial highway by the New York State Department of Transportation and is eligible for federal aid.

=== Route description ===
==== West of Shelter Rock Road ====
I.U. Willets Road begins at a cul-de-sac in North Hills, near Buckley Country Day School. It then continues east to Shelter Rock Road (CR 8); this stretch of I.U. Willets Road is privately owned and maintained.

==== East of Shelter Rock Road ====
===== Western segment of CR D24 =====
At Shelter Rock Road, I.U. Willets Road becomes a Nassau County-owned and maintained road and is designated as the western segment of County Route D24; Nassau County and New York State mileage data for the road each begin at this location. This segment of CR D24 extends east to the North Hills–Searingtown border at Oak Ridge Lane, east of which there is a gap in the CR 24 designation; I.U. Willets Road then continues east from the North Hills–Searingtown border under the ownership and jurisdiction of the Town of North Hempstead.

This western segment of CR D24 is 0.29 miles (0.47 km) in total length.

===== Town-maintained segment =====
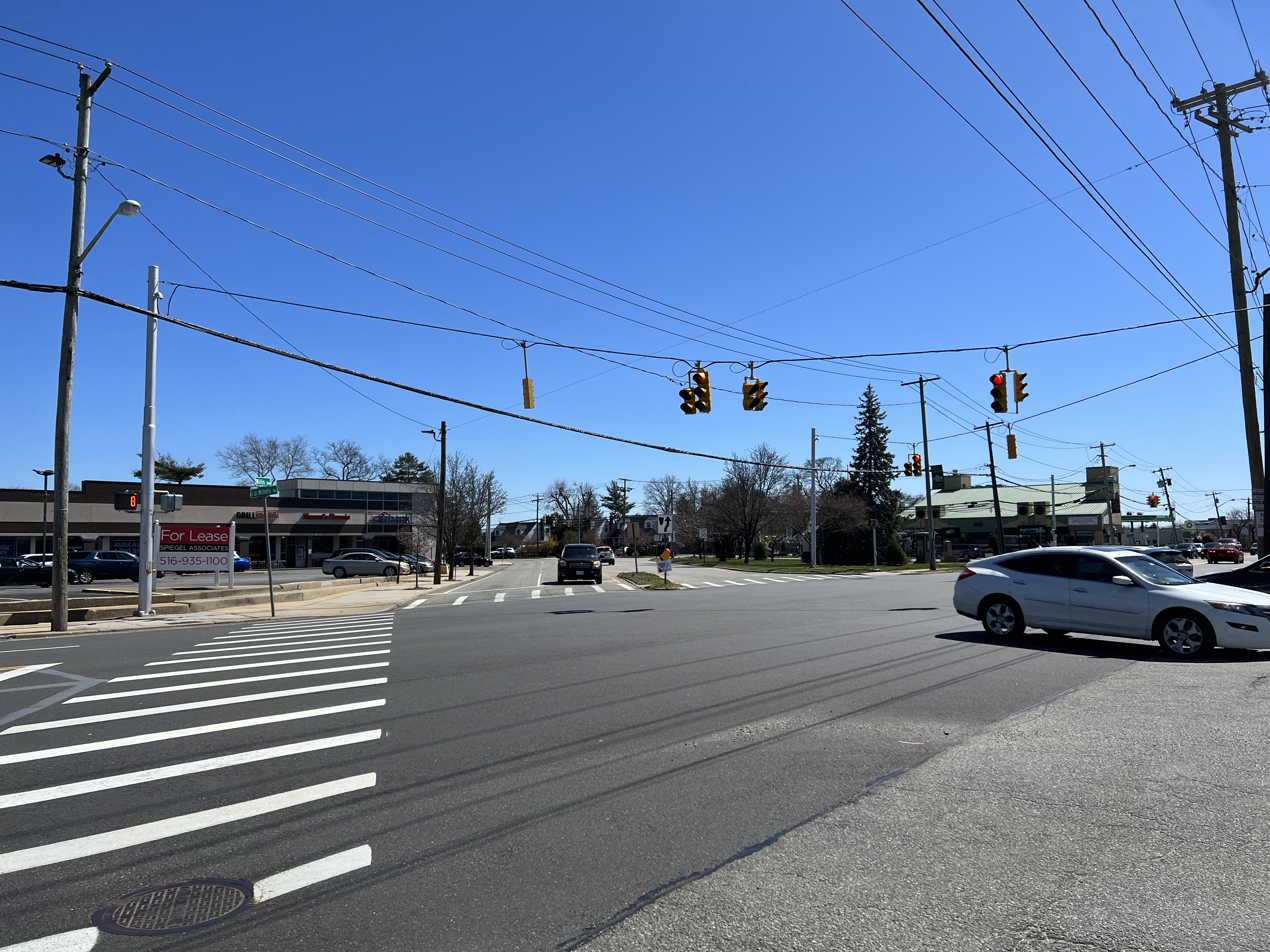
I.U. Willets Road at Willis Avenue (CR E64) in Albertson in 2023

East of Oak Ridge Lane and the North Hills–Searingtown border, the CR D24 designation ceases and the Town of North Hempstead assumes ownership and maintenance responsibilities for the next 2.10 miles (3.38 km) of I.U. Willets Road. It continues east, soon passing and providing access to Herricks High School. It then continues heading east and shortly thereafter intersects Searingtown Road (CR 101), adjacent to the Henry Viscardi School and Nassau County Stormwater Retention Basin N-00468. Continuing east, I.U. Willets Road passes and provides access to the historic Searing Roslyn United Methodist Church and its cemetery, and providing access to the Herricks Union Free School District's Searingtown Elementary School. I.U. Willets Road then continues east and intersects Deepdale Parkway, entering Albertson and continuing east to Willis Avenue (CR E64).

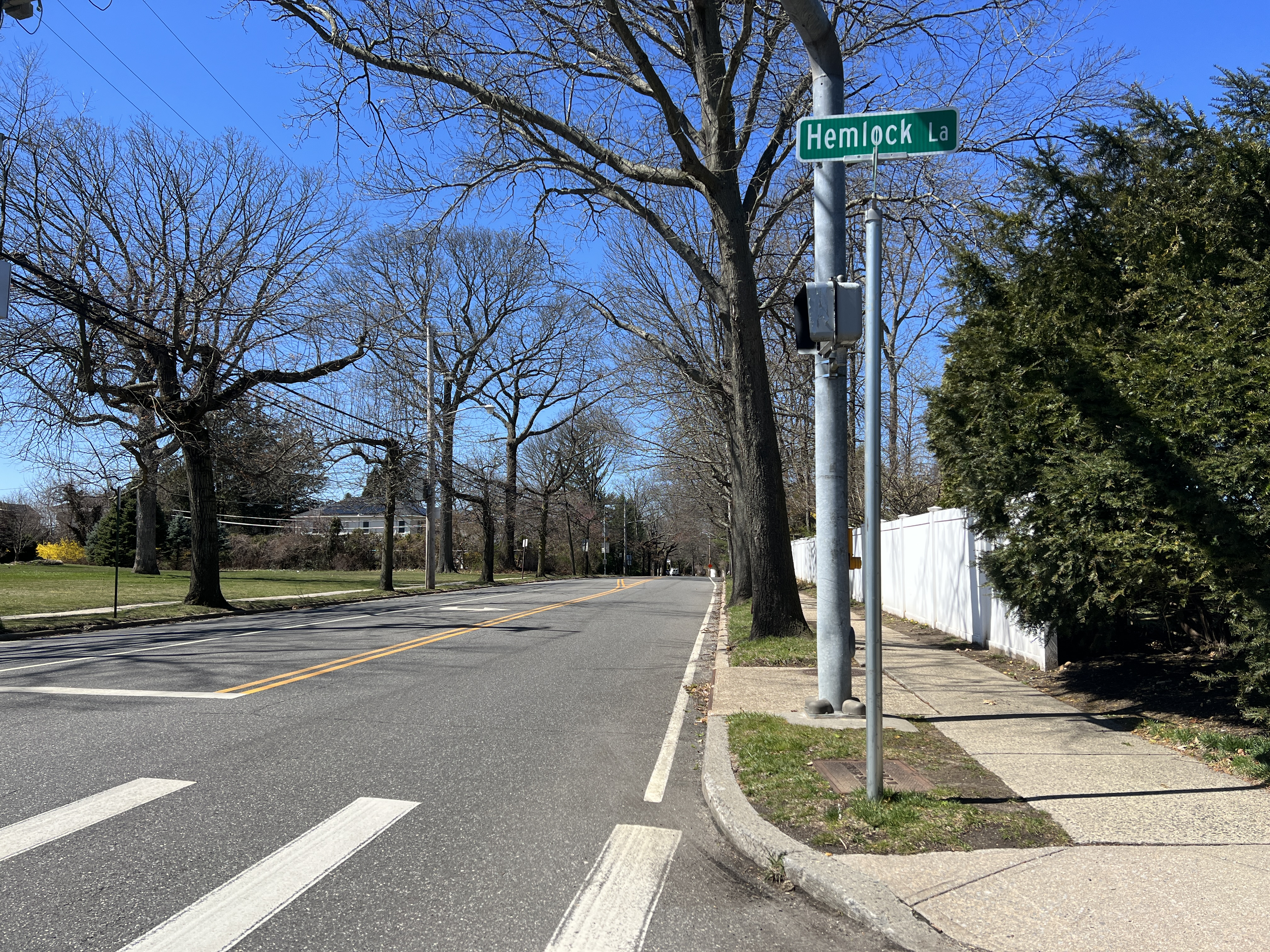
I.U. Willets Road at Hemlock Lane in Roslyn Heights in 2023

At Willis Avenue, I.U. Willets Road briefly veers southeast to a junction with a short spur of the road, forming a triangular, Town of North Hempstead-owned park, known as The Albertson Triangle. It then once again continues east, soon intersecting Albertson Parkway and thence crosses the Long Island Rail Road's Oyster Bay Branch at-grade, adjacent to the Albertson LIRR station and entering Roslyn Heights. Just east of the train tracks, I.U. Willets Road provides access to the Clark Botanic Garden, and continues east, intersecting Roslyn Road (CR 7A) shortly thereafter. From there, I.U. Willets Road continues east as the main west–east thoroughfare through the Levitt & Sons-developed Roslyn Country Club housing development, soon passing the East Williston Union Free School District's Willets Road Elementary School, and then reaching Exit 30 of the Northern State Parkway. The road then reaches the Roslyn Heights–Old Westbury border just prior to the overpass carrying I.U. Willets Road over the Northern State Parkway; Town ownership ceases at this location and County ownership and maintenance of the road once again begins, and is the western end of the eastern segment of CR D24.

===== Eastern segment of CR D24 =====
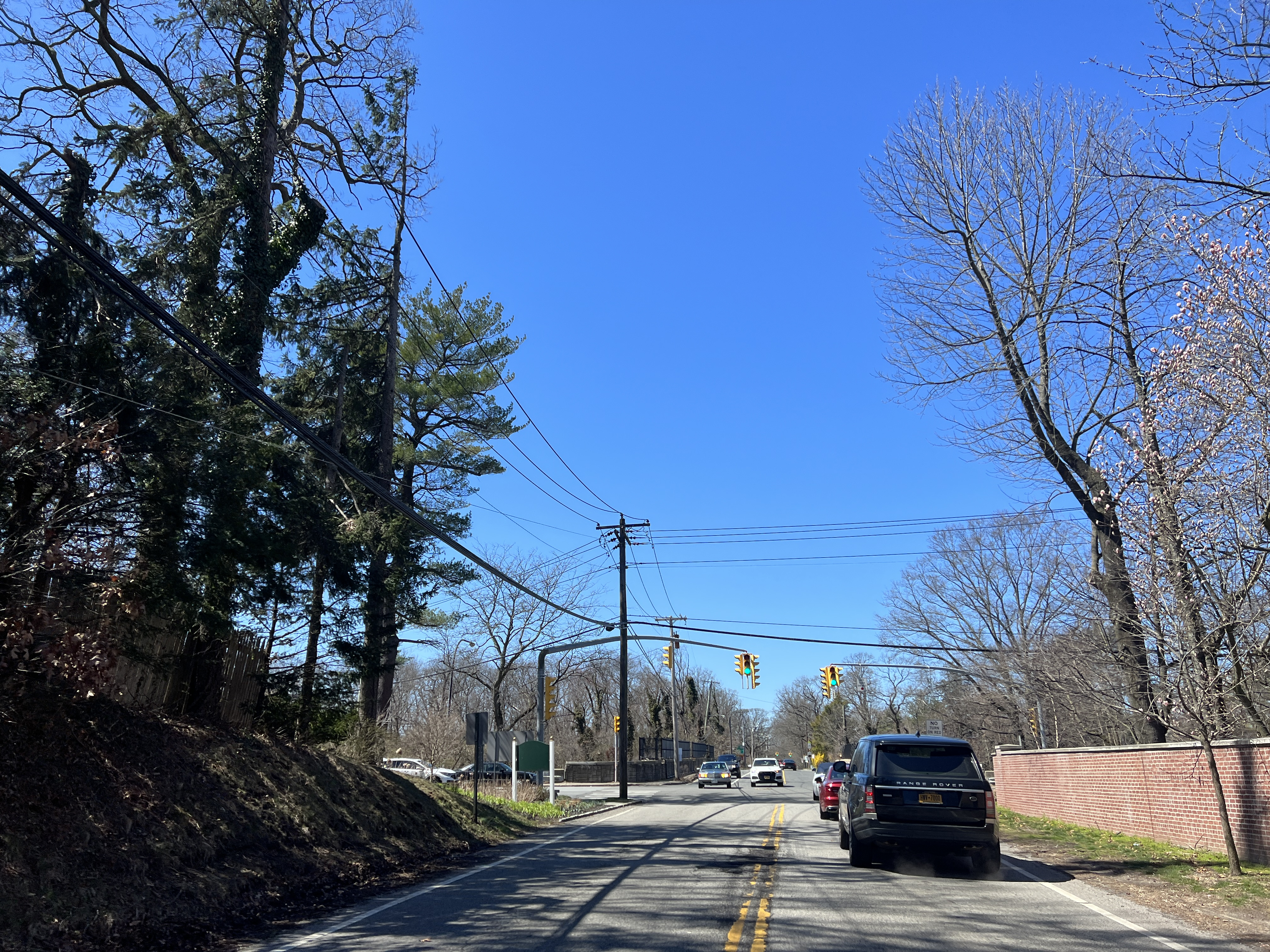
I.U. Willets Rd at Glen Cove Road (CR 1) in Old Westbury in 2023

The 1.30-mile (2.09 km) eastern segment of CR D24 begins on the Old Westbury side of the Roslyn Heights–Old Westbury border. It then proceeds east, crossing above the Northern State Parkway and then intersecting Glen Cove Road (CR 1). From there, it continues east, reaching Bacon Road 0.30 miles (0.48 km) east of Glen Cove Road. I.U. Willets Road then continues east for a distance, and then turns towards the east-northeast, shortly thereafter reaching its eastern terminus at Old Westbury Road.

==== Former segment ====
Historically, I.U. Willets Road once continued west past its current western terminus, connecting to Old Court House Road, thence New Hyde Park Road, and ending at the former Little Neck–Old Westbury Road (NY 25D); NY 25D was eventually replaced in the area by the Long Island Expressway (I-495). West of New Hyde Park Road, it continued to NY 25D – I.U. Willets Road's former western terminus – via what is now Hollow Lane.

The road was split after the Northern State Parkway was constructed, severing what is now Hollow Lane from the rest of I.U. Willets Road east of the highway.

== History ==
I.U. Willets Road was first planned c. 1850 and built in 1870, traversing land owned by Isaac Underhill Willets, a prominent local and member of one of the first European families to settle on Long Island. Although many supported the road's creation, a number of locals were also opposed to the road's construction for a various reasons. One reason was that many of the farmers in the area were concerned about the impact it would have on their farmland and did not want the new road so close to their homes. Another reason expressed by locals opposed to the construction was that there were already roads in the area which paralleled the then-proposed roadway, and that it would be expensive to construct the new road. However, despite the concerns, the plans were approved, and I.U. Willets Road was ultimately built, opening c. 1870.

On November 30, 1943, a 53-year-old woman driving a Ford sedan was killed when a train collided with her vehicle as she was traversing the grade crossing on I.U. Willets Road, adjacent to the Albertson LIRR station. At the time of the incident, the grade crossing was not equipped with gates.

Originally named Westbury Road, the road was eventually renamed I.U. Willets Road in honor of Isaac Underhill Willets. Other portions of the road have historically been known as Albertson Station Road.

Prior to the Town of North Hempstead taking over ownership responsibilities of the road from Nassau County, the entire road west of Shelter Rock Road was a continuous county route without a gap. The road was designated as CR 31 prior to being renumbered as CR D24.

== Major intersections ==
The entire route is within Nassau County.

Location	mi	km	Destinations	Notes
North Hills			Dead-end	Western terminus.
North Hills	0.00	0.00	Shelter Rock Road (CR 8)	NCDPW jurisdiction begins. Mileage data begins at this location; western end of CR D24's western segment.
North Hills–Searingtown line	0.29	0.47	Oak Ridge Lane	Eastern end of CR D24's western segment; TONH jurisdiction begins.
Searingtown	0.71	1.14	Searingtown Road (CR 101)	
Searingtown–Albertson line	1.04	1.67	Deepdale Parkway	
Albertson	1.17	1.88	Willis Avenue (CR E64)	
Albertson	1.56	2.51	Albertson Avenue	Access to the Albertson LIRR station via pathway just east of the intersection.
Roslyn Heights	1.83	2.95	Roslyn Road (CR 7A)	
Roslyn Heights	2.34	3.77	Northern State Parkway east – Hauppauge	Exit 30 on the Northern State Parkway; access to eastbound NSP only.
Roslyn Heights–Old Westbury line	2.39	3.85	Parkway overpass	TONH jurisdiction ends; NCDPW jurisdiction begins. Beginning of eastern segment of CR D24.
Old Westbury	2.44	3.93	Glen Cove Road (CR 1)	
Old Westbury	2.74	4.41	Bacon Road	
Old Westbury	3.69	5.94	Old Westbury Road	Eastern terminus.
1.000 mi = 1.609 km; 1.000 km = 0.621 mi: Incomplete access; Route transition

== Landmarks ==
The Searing Roslyn United Methodist Church is located off I.U. Willets Road in Searingtown. Additionally, the Clark Botanic Garden is located off the road in Roslyn Heights.

== See also ==
- List of county routes in Nassau County, New York
