= Albertson, New York =

- Hamlet and census-designated place
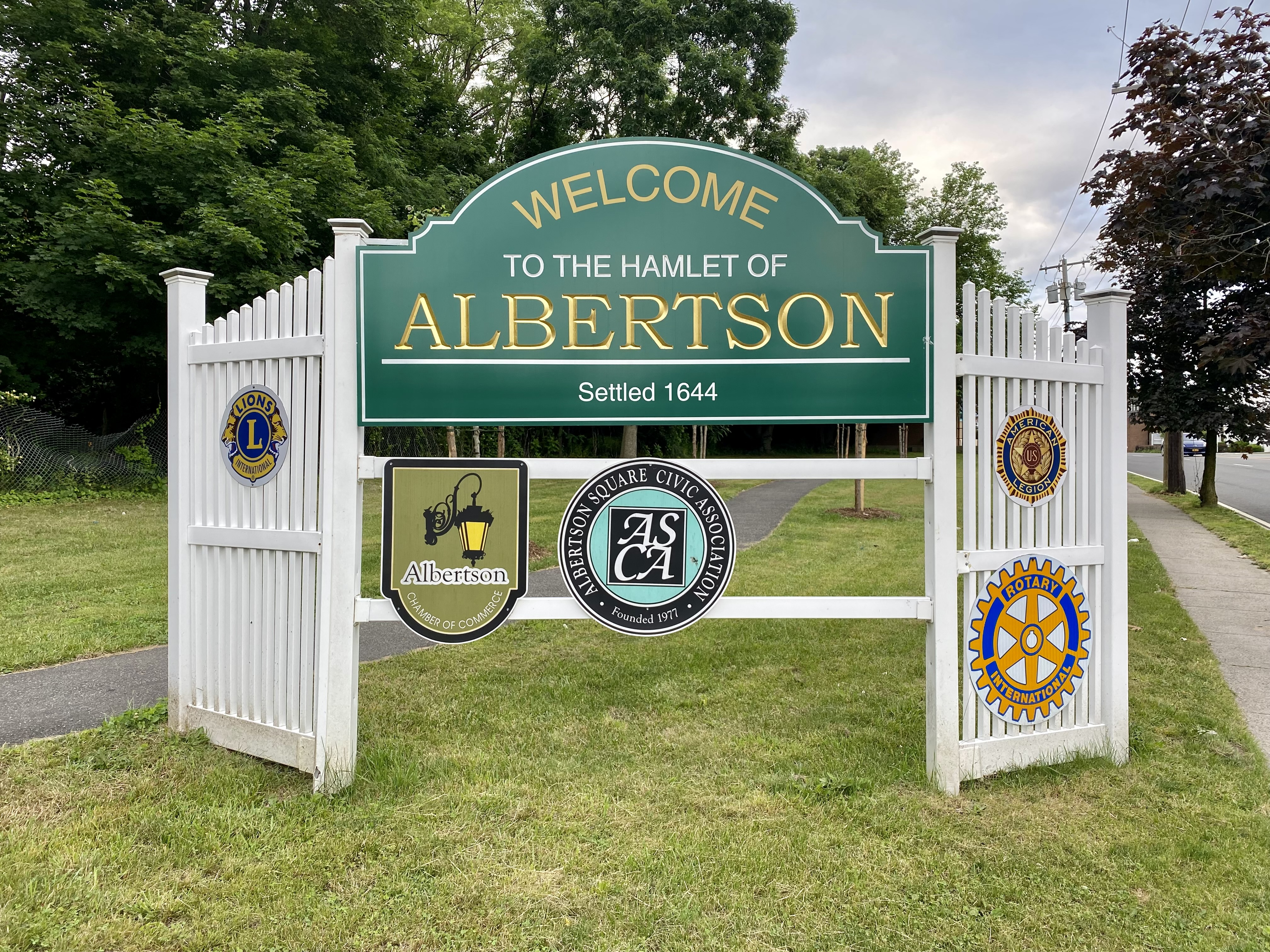
- An Albertson welcome sign at Reflection Park

- Location in Nassau County and the state of New York

- Location on Long Island Location within the state of New York
- Coordinates: 40°46′14″N 73°38′55″W
- Country: United States
- State: New York
- County: Nassau
- Town: North Hempstead
- Named for: Townsend Albertson

Area
  - Total: 0.68 sq mi (1.76 km^{2})
  - Land: 0.68 sq mi (1.76 km^{2})
  - Water: 0 sq mi (0.00 km^{2})
- Elevation: 128 ft (39 m)

Population (2020)
  - Total: 5,220
  - Density: 7,688.0/sq mi (2,968.34/km^{2})
- Demonym: Albertsonian
- Time zone: UTC-5 (Eastern (EST))
  - Summer (DST): UTC-4 (EDT)
- ZIP Codes: 11507 (Albertson); 11577 (Roslyn Heights)
- Area codes: 516, 363
- FIPS code: 36-01011
- GNIS feature ID: 0942241

Albertson is a hamlet and census-designated place (CDP) in the Town of North Hempstead in Nassau County, on Long Island, in New York, United States. The population was 5,220 at the time of the 2020 census.

== History ==
The first European settler was John Seren who came from Connecticut in 1644. Later, Townsend Albertson started a farm and gristmill and the community eventually became known as Albertson, after him.

In 1850, a road was built through Albertson on the lands of Isaac Underhill Willets. The road is still known as I.U. Willets Road. (Willets complained that Long Island has more roads than it would ever need). The Long Island Rail Road opened an Albertson train station in 1864.

In 1908, the Long Island Motor Parkway was built through Albertson, along what is now its southern border with the Village of Williston Park. In 1938, it was closed, and in 1940, it was replaced by the Northern State Parkway, which runs along the northern border of Albertson, with Roslyn Heights.

In 1910, after a house in the Albertson Square section of the hamlet burned down in a blaze due to a lack of fire protection service in the area, locals created the Albertson Fire District to ensure the area would receive the necessary fire coverage. Seven years later, in 1917, the Albertson Water District was established.

On February 21, 1928, the Albertson Post Office opened.

In 1946, major postwar suburbanization began in the community with the construction of a small development by William Levitt.

In 1950, as the rapid suburbanization of the region continued, the Hillside Terrace-at-Albertson development – a large, 55-acre (22 ha) housing development wedged between Willis Avenue to the west, the Long Island Rail Road's Oyster Bay Branch to the east, I.U. Willets Road to the south, and an earlier development along Netz Place to the north – was constructed on land previously occupied by Bloodgood Nurseries. Developed by Joseph Carillo, Samuel Levin, and Joseph Wanes, the Hillside Terrace section included approximately 322 single-family homes and a large shopping center. This shopping center – The Shoppes at Willets Crossing (also known as the Albertson Shopping Center and Albertson Marketplace) – was built at a cost of approximately $75,000 (1950 USD) and is located at the northwestern corner of Willis Avenue and I.U. Willets Road.

In 1953, the present Albertson Fire District headquarters – located on I.U. Willets Road – was constructed.

To better serve the growing number of children residing within the portions of Albertson zoned for its schools and to relieve overcrowding in its other elementary schools, the Mineola Union Free School District opened the Meadow Drive Elementary School on Meadow Drive – located within the Albertson's Hillside Terrace neighborhood – in September 1954. The school's construction was approved by district residents on February 28, 1953, approving the resolution by a vote of 1,524-to-749. The school was officially dedicated on September 23, 1954.

In 1962, the Herricks Union Free School District's Searingtown Elementary School – located as of 2025 within Albertson, per the United States Census Bureau's boundaries – was one of the schools involved in the landmark Supreme Court case, Engel v. Vitale (1962). That case set the modern precedent in which government-directed prayers are prohibited in public schools.

By the mid-1960s, the last farms in Albertson had been developed over with housing and businesses, and the community had become fully suburban in character.

In 1977, sparked in large part out of concerns stemming from a controversial development proposal, locals formed the Albertson Square Civic Association – Albertson's local civic association. The organization continued to grow over the ensuing decades, and in 2025, it was renamed The Albertson Civic.

=== Etymology ===
Albertson is named for Townsend Albertson, one of the earliest settlers in the community. Albertson operated a farm and a gristmill in the area.

== Geography ==
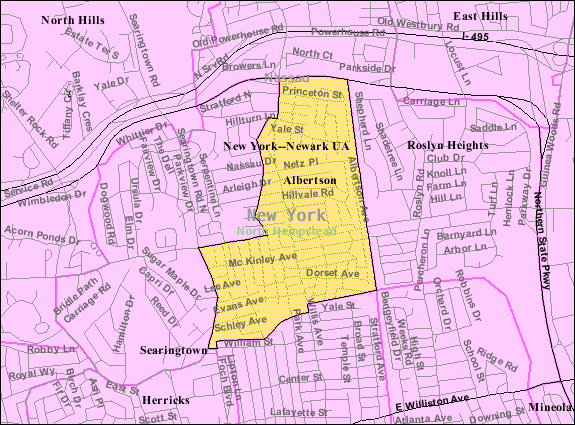
U.S. Census map of Albertson

According to the United States Census Bureau, the CDP has a total area of 0.7 square miles (1.8 km^{2}), all land.

Albertson is located south and west of the hamlet of Roslyn Heights, east of the hamlet of Searingtown, and north of the Incorporated Village of Williston Park.

The CDP's northern border with Roslyn Heights, furthermore, is the Northern State Parkway, while its southern border with Williston Park follows the former alignment of the Long Island Motor Parkway.

=== Drainage ===
Albertson is located within the Mill River Watershed, which, in turn, is located within the larger Long Island Sound/Atlantic Ocean Watershed.

=== Climate ===
According to the Köppen climate classification, Albertson has a Humid subtropical climate (type Cfa) with cool, wet winters and hot, humid summers. Precipitation is uniform throughout the year, with slight spring and fall peaks.

Climate data for Albertson, New York, 1991–2020 normals, extremes 1999–present
Month	Jan	Feb	Mar	Apr	May	Jun	Jul	Aug	Sep	Oct	Nov	Dec	Year
Record high °F (°C)	71 (22)	73 (23)	85 (29)	94 (34)	97 (36)	101 (38)	105 (41)	104 (40)	100 (38)	90 (32)	83 (28)	76 (24)	105 (41)
Mean daily maximum °F (°C)	39 (4)	43 (6)	50 (10)	61 (16)	70 (21)	80 (27)	85 (29)	83 (28)	76 (24)	65 (18)	55 (13)	45 (7)	63 (17)
Mean daily minimum °F (°C)	26 (−3)	28 (−2)	34 (1)	42 (6)	51 (11)	61 (16)	66 (19)	65 (18)	58 (14)	48 (9)	40 (4)	31 (−1)	46 (8)
Record low °F (°C)	−10 (−23)	−7 (−22)	3 (−16)	13 (−11)	32 (0)	43 (6)	50 (10)	48 (9)	38 (3)	27 (−3)	10 (−12)	−1 (−18)	−10 (−23)
Average precipitation inches (mm)	3.62 (92)	3.17 (81)	4.35 (110)	4.15 (105)	3.90 (99)	3.85 (98)	4.40 (112)	3.72 (94)	3.91 (99)	4.08 (104)	3.73 (95)	3.82 (97)	46.7 (1,186)
Source: The Weather Channel

==== Plant zone ====
According to the United States Department of Agriculture (USDA), Albertson is located within hardiness zone 7b.

== Demographics ==
Historical population
Census	Pop.	Note	%±
1940	1,238		—
1960	6,090		—
1970	6,825		12.1%
1980	5,561		−18.5%
2000	5,200		—
2010	5,182		−0.3%
2020	5,220		0.7%
U.S. Decennial Census Long Island Historical Population

=== Racial and ethnic composition ===
Albertson CDP, New York – Racial and ethnic composition Note: the US Census treats Hispanic/Latino as an ethnic category. This table excludes Latinos from the racial categories and assigns them to a separate category. Hispanics/Latinos may be of any race.
Race / Ethnicity (NH = Non-Hispanic)	Pop 2000	Pop 2010	Pop 2020	% 2000	% 2010	% 2020
White alone (NH)	4,067	3,385	2,867	78.21%	65.32%	54.92%
Black or African American alone (NH)	8	12	25	0.15%	0.23%	0.48%
Native American or Alaska Native alone (NH)	0	7	6	0.00%	0.14%	0.11%
Asian alone (NH)	754	1,256	1,700	14.50%	24.24%	32.57%
Native Hawaiian or Pacific Islander alone (NH)	0	0	1	0.00%	0.00%	0.02%
Other race alone (NH)	5	19	39	0.10%	0.37%	0.75%
Mixed race or Multiracial (NH)	80	126	114	1.54%	2.43%	2.18%
Hispanic or Latino (any race)	286	377	468	5.50%	7.28%	8.97%
Total	5,200	5,182	5,220	100.00%	100.00%	100.00%

=== 2020 census ===
As of the 2020 census, Albertson had a population of 5,220. The median age was 45.6 years. 19.5% of residents were under the age of 18 and 22.1% of residents were 65 years of age or older. For every 100 females there were 95.4 males, and for every 100 females age 18 and over there were 91.0 males age 18 and over.

100.0% of residents lived in urban areas, while 0.0% lived in rural areas.

There were 1,795 households in Albertson, of which 31.0% had children under the age of 18 living in them. Of all households, 62.5% were married-couple households, 12.5% were households with a male householder and no spouse or partner present, and 22.8% were households with a female householder and no spouse or partner present. About 20.6% of all households were made up of individuals and 13.5% had someone living alone who was 65 years of age or older.

There were 1,857 housing units, of which 3.3% were vacant. The homeowner vacancy rate was 1.8% and the rental vacancy rate was 3.1%.

=== 2010 census ===
As of the census of 2010, there were 5,182 people, 1,812 households, and 1,442 families residing in the CDP. The population density was 7,866.8 inhabitants per square mile (3,037.4/km^{2}). There were 1,853 housing units at an average density of 2,803.3 per square mile (1,082.4/km^{2}). The racial makeup of the CDP was 70.4% White, 24.3% Asian, 0.3% African American, 0.02% Native American, 1.27% from other races, and 1.83% from two or more races. Hispanic or Latino of any race were 5.50% of the population.

There were 1,812 households, out of which 33.6% had children under the age of 18 living with them, 67.7% were married couples living together, 8.4% had a female householder with no husband present, and 20.4% were non-families. 17.9% of all households were made up of individuals, and 11.3% had someone living alone who was 65 years of age or older. The average household size was 2.87 and the average family size was 3.27.

In the CDP, the age distribution was 22.5% under the age of 18, 6.4% from 18 to 24, 27.1% from 25 to 44, 24.6% from 45 to 64, and 19.4% who were 65 years of age or older. The median age was 42 years. For every 100 females, there were 93.7 males. For every 100 females age 18 and over, there were 90.8 males.

The median income for a household in the CDP was $66,516, and the median income for a family was $77,516. Males had a median income of $55,000 versus $44,792 for females. The per capita income for the CDP was $31,222. About 4.5% of families and 4.7% of the population were below the poverty line, including 5.4% of those under age 18 and 5.5% of those age 65 or over.

=== 2000 census ===
As of the census of 2000, there were 5,200 people, 1,812 households, and 1,442 families residing in the town. The population density is 3,042.0/km² (7,866.8/mi²). There are 1,853 housing units at an average density of 1,084.0/km² (2,803.3/mi²). The racial makeup of the town is 82.13% White, 0.23% African American, 0.02% Native American, 14.52% Asian, 0.00% Pacific Islander, 1.27% from other races, and 1.83% from two or more races. 5.50% of the population are Hispanic or Latino of any race.

There are 1,812 households out of which 33.6% have children under the age of 18 living with them, 67.7% are married couples living together, 8.4% have a female householder with no husband present, and 20.4% are non-families. 17.9% of all households are made up of individuals and 11.3% have someone living alone who is 65 years of age or older. The average household size is 2.87 and the average family size is 3.27.

In the town the age distribution was 22.5% under the age of 18, 6.4% from 18 to 24, 27.1% from 25 to 44, 24.6% from 45 to 64, and 19.4% who were 65 years of age or older. The median age was 42 years. For every 100 females there were 93.7 males. For every 100 females age 18 and over, there were 90.8 males.

The median income for a household in the town was $66,516, and the median income for a family was $77,516. Males had a median income of $55,000 versus $44,792 for females. The per capita income for the town was $31,222. 4.7% of the population and 4.5% of families were below the poverty line. Out of the total people living in poverty, 5.4% were under the age of 18 and 5.5% were 65 or older.

== Parks and recreation ==
- Albertson Triangle
- John D. Caemmerer Park
- Reflection Park

== Government ==
=== Town representation ===
As an unincorporated hamlet within the Town of North Hempstead, Albertson has no government of its own, and is instead governed directly by said Town, which is seated in Manhasset.

Albertson is located within the Town of North Hempstead's 2nd council district, which as of August 2025 is represented on the North Hempstead Town Council by resident Edward W. Scott (R–Albertson).

=== Representation in higher government ===
==== County representation ====
Albertson is located in Nassau County's 18th Legislative district, which as of August 2025 is represented in the Nassau County Legislature by Samantha A. Goetz (R–Locust Valley).

==== New York State representation ====
===== New York State Assembly =====
Albertson is split between the New York State Assembly's 16th and 19th State Assembly districts, which as of August 2025 are represented by Daniel J. Norber (R–Great Neck) and Edward Ra (R–Garden City South), respectively.

===== New York State Senate =====
Albertson is located in the New York State Senate's 7th State Senate district, which as of August 2025 is represented in the New York State Senate by Jack M. Martins (R–Mineola).

==== Federal representation ====
===== United States Congress =====
Albertson is located entirely within New York's 3rd Congressional district, which as of August 2025 is represented in the United States Congress by Thomas R. Suozzi (D–Glen Cove).

===== United States Senate =====
Like the rest of New York, Albertson is represented in the United States Senate by Charles E. Schumer (D) and Kirsten Gillibrand (D).

=== Politics ===
In the 2024 United States presidential election, the majority of Albertson voters voted for Donald J. Trump (R).

== Education ==
=== School districts ===
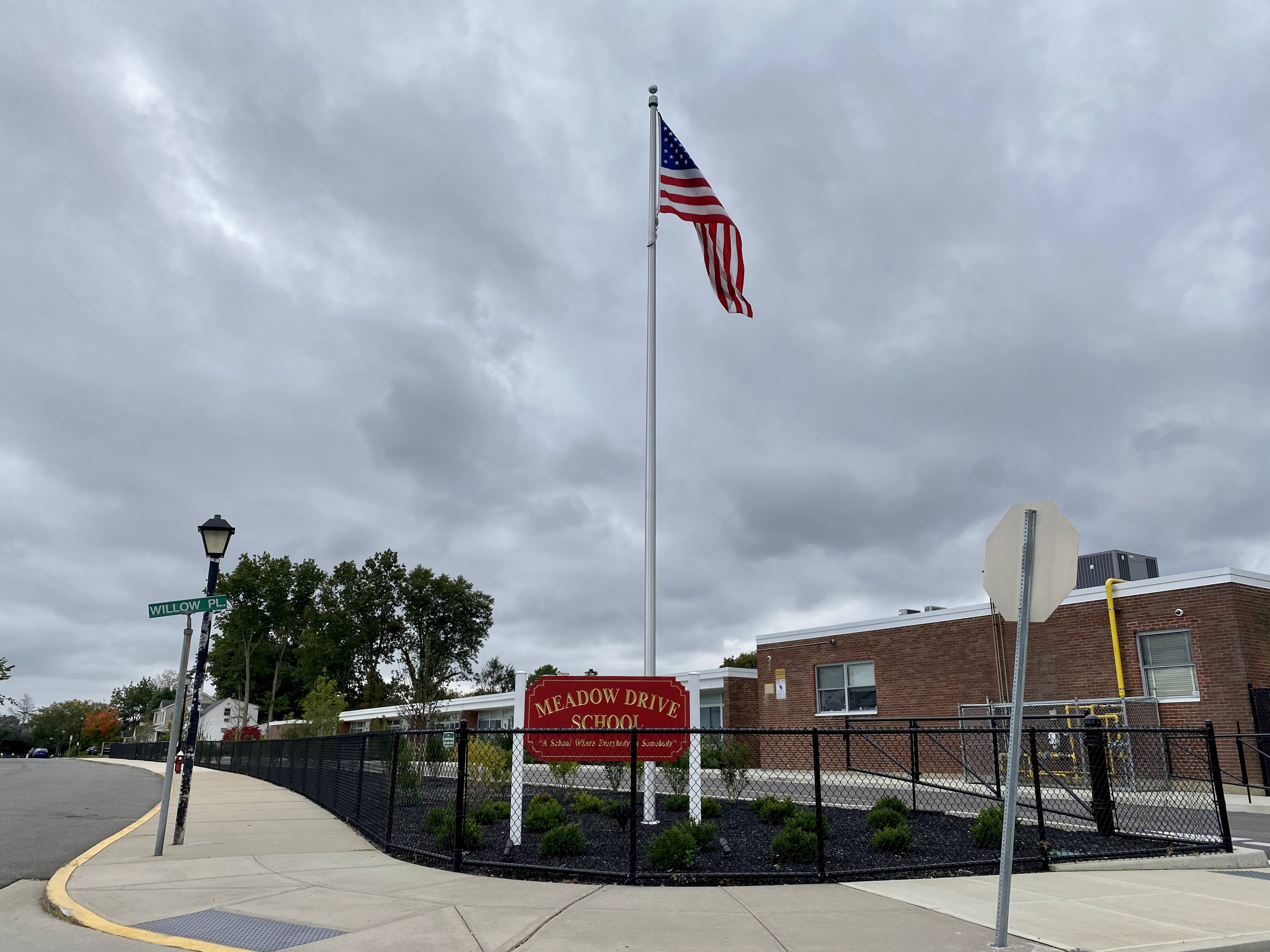
The Mineola UFSD's Meadow Drive Elementary School, located within the Hillside Terrace section of the hamlet

Albertson is located within the boundaries of (and is thus served by) the Mineola Union Free School District, the East Williston Union Free School District, the Herricks Union Free School District, and the Roslyn Union Free School District. As such, children who reside within the hamlet and attend public schools will go to school in one of these four school districts depending on where they live within the hamlet.

=== Library districts ===
Albertson is located within the boundaries of (and is thus served by) Roslyn's library district (the Bryant Library) and the Shelter Rock Library District. The area of the hamlet located served by the Roslyn Union Free School District is served by the Bryant Library in the Village of Roslyn, and the areas of the hamlet served by the Mineola and the Herricks Union Free School Districts are each served by the Shelter Rock Public Library in Searingtown.

== Infrastructure ==
=== Transportation ===
==== Road ====
The Northern State Parkway forms the hamlet's northern border with Roslyn Heights. Other major roads which pass through the hamlet include I.U. Willets Road and Willis Avenue.

Additionally, the Long Island Motor Parkway used to run through the hamlet.

==== Rail ====
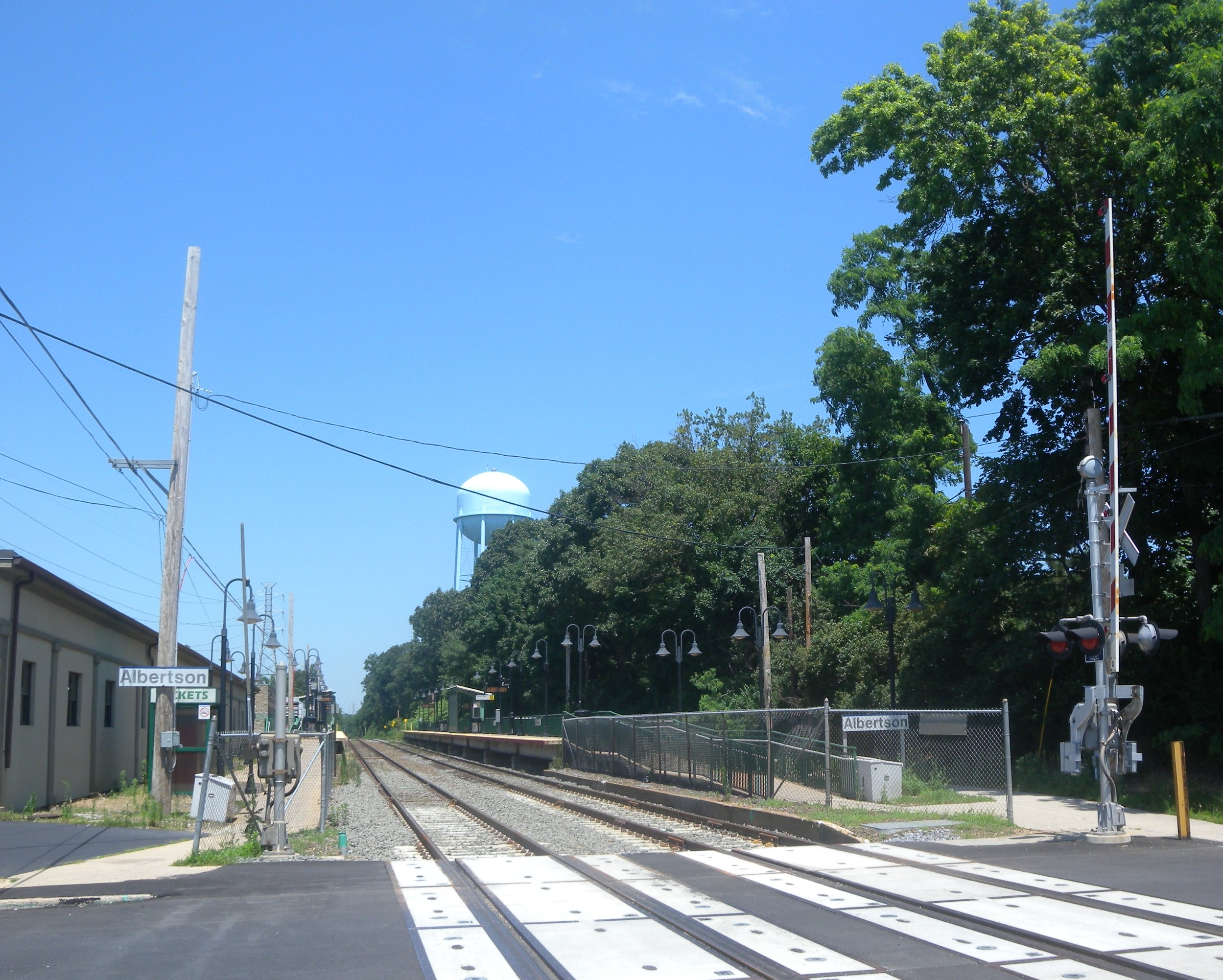
The Albertson Long Island Rail Road station in 2012

Albertson is served by the Albertson station on the Long Island Rail Road's Oyster Bay Branch, which straddles the Albertson–Roslyn Heights border.

==== Bus ====
Roslyn Estates is served by the n23 bus route, which is operated by Nassau Inter-County Express (NICE). This bus route travels along Willis Avenue through the hamlet, following the route of the former New York & North Shore Traction Company's trolley route between Mineola and Roslyn, which ran through the area in the early 20th century.

=== Utilities ===
==== Natural gas ====
National Grid USA provides natural gas to all properties that are hooked up to natural gas lines in Albertson.

==== Power ====
PSEG Long Island provides power to all homes and businesses within Albertson, on behalf of the Long Island Power Authority.

==== Sewage ====
Albertson in its entirety is connected to the Nassau County Sewage District's sanitary sewer network.

==== Water ====
Albertson is primarily located within the boundaries of the Albertson Water District. However, smaller portions are served by the Garden City Park Water District, the Roslyn Water District, and the Village of Williston Park's municipal water supply system.

== Notable people ==
- Thomas P. DiNapoli – 54th Comptroller of the State of New York; formerly lived on Coventry Avenue.
- Danny Masterson – Convicted rapist and former actor; grew up in Albertson.
- Rick Pasqualone – American actor and voice actor.

== See also ==
- List of census-designated places in New York
- Searingtown, New York
