= Albertson station =

Long Island Rail Road station in Nassau County, New York

Albertson
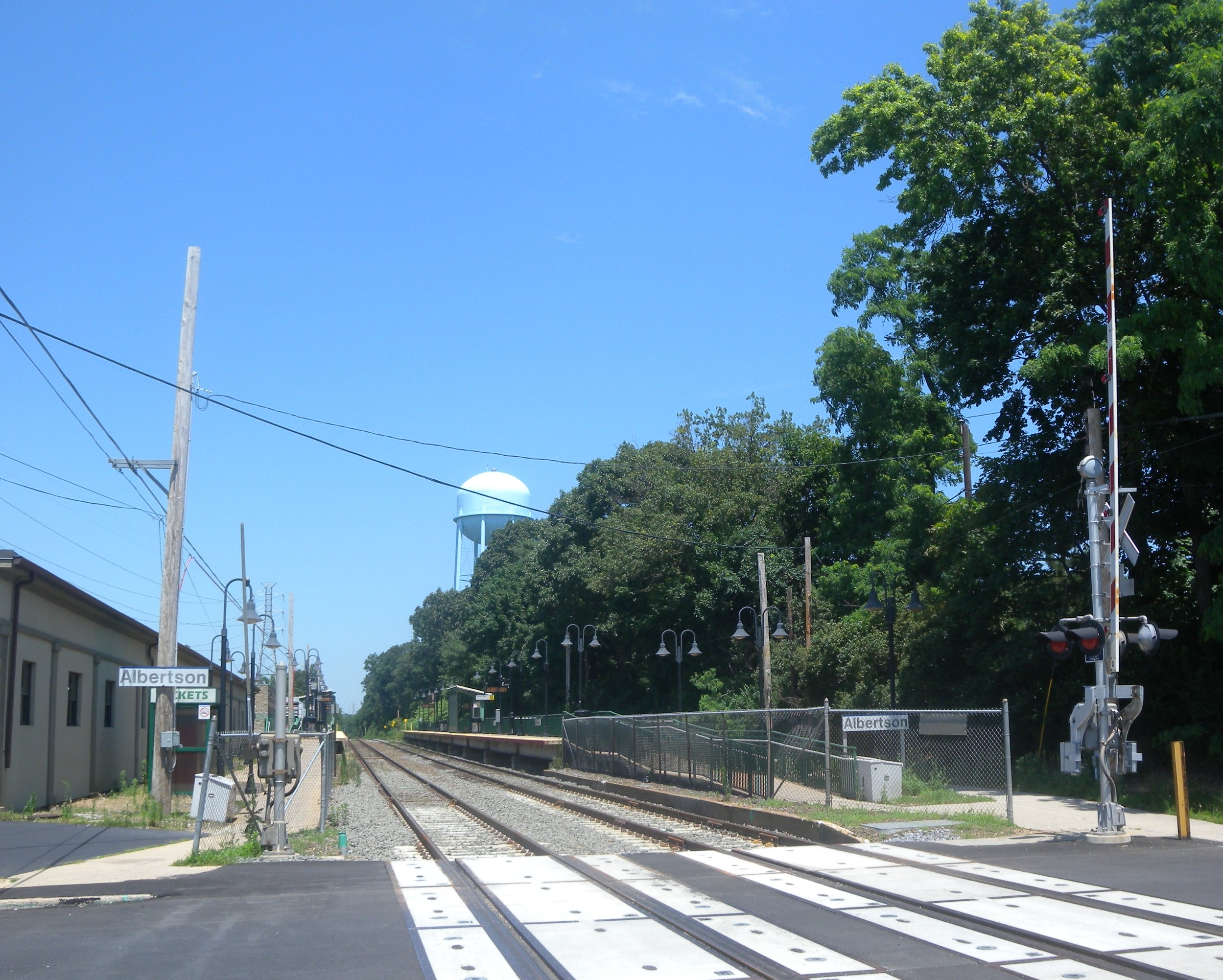
- The Albertson station, viewed from I.U. Willets Road

General information
- Location: I.U. Willets Road and Albertson Avenue; Albertson, New York
- Coordinates: 40.771872°N 73.641679°W
- Owner: Long Island Rail Road
- Line: Oyster Bay Branch
- Distance: 20.8 mi (33.5 km) from Long Island City
- Platforms: 2 side platforms
- Tracks: 2

Construction
- Parking: Yes
- Accessible: Yes

Other information
- Station code: ABT
- Fare zone: 7

History
- Opened: March 1874 (as a milk station); June 1875 (flag stop)
- Rebuilt: 1913, 1997–1998
- Former names: Albertson's

Passengers
- 2012—2014: 512 per weekday

Services
Preceding station	Long Island Rail Road	Following station
East Williston toward Penn Station, Jamaica or Long Island City	Oyster Bay Branch	Roslyn toward Oyster Bay
Location

Albertson is a station on the Long Island Rail Road's Oyster Bay Branch. The station is on the north side of I.U. Willets Road at Albertson Avenue on the Albertson–Roslyn Heights border, in Nassau County, New York, United States.

The parking lot is located on the south side of I.U. Willets Road, on the eastern side of the tracks. The station is also located adjacent to the Clark Botanic Garden.

== History ==
The station was originally opened with name Albertson's and originally opened as a milk station in March 1874 and opened as a flag stop in June 1875 by the Glen Cove Branch Rail Road. The station was renamed as Albertson in 1903.

The station had a depot building built in 1911. The building stood until 1954, when it was closed, razed, and replaced with an open-air passenger shelter.

On November 30, 1943, a 53-year-old woman driving a Ford sedan was killed when a train collided with her vehicle as she was driving across the I.U. Willets Road grade crossing, adjacent to the Albertson station. At the time of the incident, the grade crossing was not equipped with gates.

In 1960, the LIRR planned to close the station as well as East Williston station and replace them both with a single station between the two sites. The project also called for the elimination of the grade crossing with NY 25B, located south of I.U. Willets Road. However, public opposition to the proposal led to those plans ultimately being cancelled, and the existing Albertson and East Williston stations would remain open.

Between fall 1997 and fall 1998, the station's current concrete, high-level platforms were built. As part of this station reconstruction project, ramps from the street to the platforms were installed to make the station compliant with the Americans with Disabilities Act of 1990.

== Station layout ==
The station has two slightly offset high-level side platforms, each four cars long.

== See also ==
- List of Long Island Rail Road stations
- Greenvale station
