= Roslyn Heights, New York =

- Hamlet and census-designated place
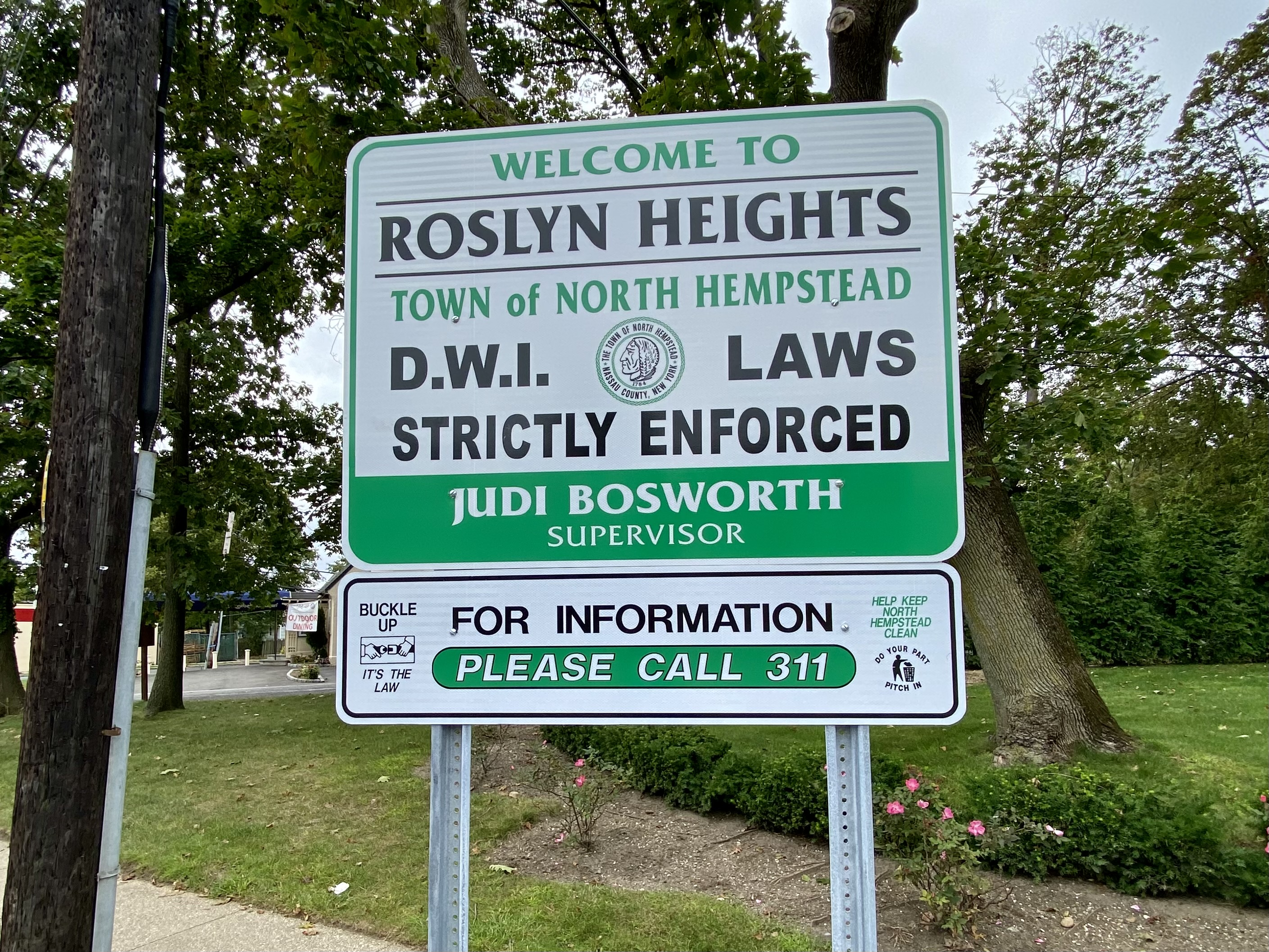
- A Roslyn Heights welcome sign on Mineola Avenue in 2020
- Nickname: "The Heights"
- Location in Nassau County and the state of New York

- Location on Long Island Location within the state of New York
- Coordinates: 40°46′57″N 73°38′29″W
- Country: United States
- State: New York
- County: Nassau
- Town: North Hempstead

Area
  - Total: 1.47 sq mi (3.82 km^{2})
  - Land: 1.47 sq mi (3.82 km^{2})
  - Water: 0 sq mi (0.00 km^{2})
- Elevation: 174 ft (53 m)

Population (2020)
  - Total: 6,747
  - Density: 4,573/sq mi (1,765.5/km^{2})
- Demonym(s): Roslynian; Roslynite
- Time zone: UTC−5 (Eastern (EST))
  - Summer (DST): UTC−4 (EDT)
- ZIP Codes: 11577 (Roslyn Heights); 11507 (Albertson)
- Area codes: 516, 363
- FIPS code: 36-63814
- GNIS feature ID: 0962934

Roslyn Heights is a hamlet and census-designated place (CDP) in the Town of North Hempstead in Nassau County, on the North Shore of Long Island, in New York, United States. It is considered part of the Greater Roslyn area, which is anchored by the Incorporated Village of Roslyn. The population was 6,747 at the time of the 2020 census.

== History ==
Roslyn Heights saw a major economic boom in the 1860s, shortly after the Long Island Rail Road's Oyster Bay Branch was built through and opened in the area in 1865 between Mineola and Glen Head; an intermediate stop opened within the hamlet as part of this construction.

Starting in 1892, a corporation was started to develop the northwestern section of the hamlet. Members of this development corporation included lawyers, bankers, and developers. This development, which was named Roslyn Highlands, was largely unsuccessful. Eventually, the western portion of the proposed Roslyn Highlands development was developed using the name of Roslyn Highlands while the eastern part was developed using the name of Roslyn Heights. These names were used for the respective sections until the whole area became known as Roslyn Heights in the late 1920s.

On July 18, 1913, the Roslyn Heights Post Office opened. It moved to its present location at 66 Mineola Avenue in 1967, with the dedication ceremony taking place on Sunday, July 30, 1967; the construction contracts were awarded in 1966.

In 1931, a controversy arose when Roslyn unveiled its final (and ultimately successful) proposal to incorporate itself as a village. Under this proposal, Roslyn Heights – which had asked to be part of the new village – was not included in the planned village's territory, causing residents and civic leaders in Roslyn Heights opposing and attempting to stop Roslyn's incorporation; a lack of a unified coalition between Roslyn Heights and the downtown areas were cited by proponents as a reason why Roslyn Heights needed to be left out. In spite of these protests, the Town of North Hempstead allowed the incorporation process to proceed, and the Village of Roslyn ultimately was officially established on January 11, 1932 – without taking in Roslyn Heights.

On December 27, 1948, residents in the Village of Old Westbury – through a vote of 81-to-6 – approved a ballot measure, in which that village would cede approximately 375 acres (152 ha) of its territory at its westernmost edge, after receiving a petition to hold such a vote from four property owners in that area; this land included all those portions of the village south and east of the Northern State Parkway, west to the Oyster Bay Branch. Governance and jurisdiction over this ceded territory – on much of which the Levitt & Sons-developed Roslyn Country Club section of the present-day Roslyn Heights CDP would be constructed – would accordingly revert from the Village of Old Westbury to the Town of North Hempstead.

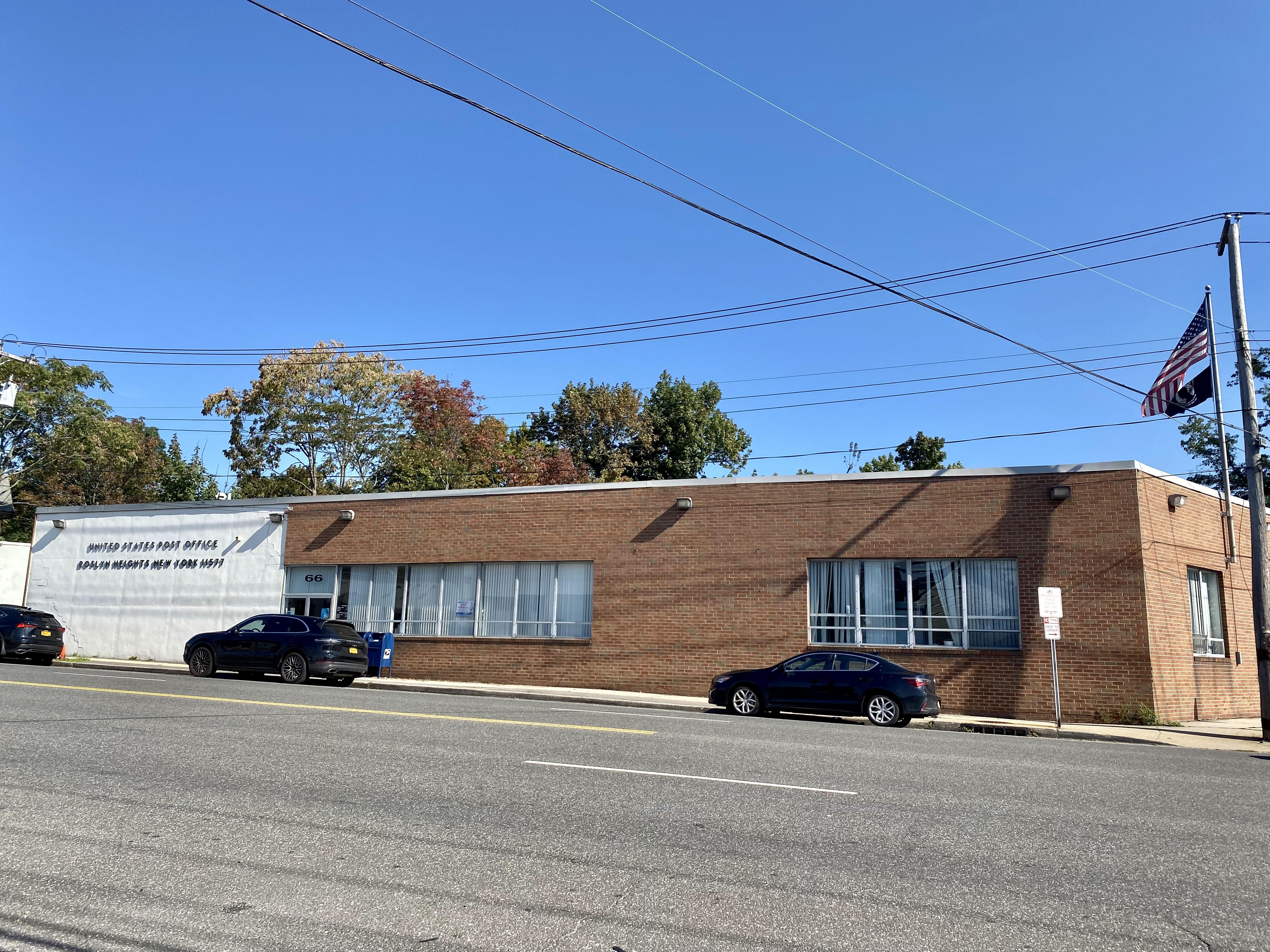
The Roslyn Heights Post Office in 2021

In the 1950s and 1960s, a neighborhood in the Roslyn Heights south of the Northern State Parkway – the Levitt & Sons-developed Roslyn Country Club development – proposed incorporating itself as a village, citing the desire for home rule the first time in the 1950s and their dissatisfaction with Nassau County's plans to widen Roslyn Road the second time in the 1960s. These proposals ultimately failed, and the Roslyn Country Club neighborhood would remain part of unincorporated Roslyn Heights, directly governed by the Town of North Hempstead to this day.

A major urban renewal project also took place in the northeastern part of the hamlet during the 20th Century – specifically in the area surrounding the Roslyn Long Island Rail Road station known as Roslyn Plaza. The Roslyn Plaza Urban Renewal Project began in the early 1970s and the final phase broke ground in 1983. This project was executed by the Town of North Hempstead.

Historically – and like many other parts of the Greater Roslyn area, what is now known as Roslyn Heights was known as Hempstead Harbor, until that name was changed to Roslyn in the 1840s.

=== Etymology ===
The "Roslyn" part of the hamlet's name is shared with Roslyn, Roslyn Estates, and Roslyn Harbor, and ultimately can be traced back to when the name "Roslyn" was chosen for that village, as the geography in Roslyn reminded officials of the geography of Roslin, Scotland. The "Heights" part of its name reflects the name of the portion of the area developed using the name Roslyn Heights, which is ultimately the name which the Roslyn Heights Post Office opted to use when it was established in 1913.

== Geography ==
According to the United States Census Bureau, the CDP has a total area of 1.5 square miles (3.9 km^{2}), all of it land.

=== Topography ===
According to the United States Environmental Protection Agency and the United States Geological Survey, the highest point in Roslyn Heights is located at its northern border with Roslyn on Hillside Avenue, at approximately 210 feet (64 m), and the lowest point is located near its southeastern border, near the Wheatley Hills Golf Club, at approximately 100–110 feet (30–34 m).

=== Drainage ===
Roslyn Heights is split between three minor drainage areas: Inner Hempstead Harbor (part of the Hempstead Harbor Watershed), Hempstead Lake, and Mill River (the latter two being part of the Mill River Watershed), and is located within the larger Long Island Sound/Atlantic Ocean Watershed.

=== Climate ===
According to the Köppen climate classification, Roslyn Heights has a Humid subtropical climate (type Cfa) with cool, wet winters and hot, humid summers. Precipitation is uniform throughout the year, with slight spring and fall peaks.

Climate data for Roslyn Heights, New York
Month	Jan	Feb	Mar	Apr	May	Jun	Jul	Aug	Sep	Oct	Nov	Dec	Year
Record high °F (°C)	71 (22)	73 (23)	87 (31)	94 (34)	97 (36)	101 (38)	108 (42)	105 (41)	97 (36)	89 (32)	83 (28)	76 (24)	108 (42)
Mean daily maximum °F (°C)	40.4 (4.7)	42.9 (6.1)	51.1 (10.6)	61.2 (16.2)	70.6 (21.4)	79.6 (26.4)	84.5 (29.2)	83.3 (28.5)	76.0 (24.4)	65.4 (18.6)	55.7 (13.2)	45.1 (7.3)	63.0 (17.2)
Daily mean °F (°C)	33.4 (0.8)	35.0 (1.7)	42.0 (5.6)	51.8 (11.0)	60.8 (16.0)	70.1 (21.2)	75.2 (24.0)	74.1 (23.4)	67.2 (19.6)	56.5 (13.6)	47.8 (8.8)	38.2 (3.4)	54.3 (12.4)
Mean daily minimum °F (°C)	26.4 (−3.1)	27.1 (−2.7)	33.5 (0.8)	42.4 (5.8)	51.0 (10.6)	60.6 (15.9)	65.8 (18.8)	65.0 (18.3)	58.3 (14.6)	47.6 (8.7)	39.9 (4.4)	31.2 (−0.4)	45.7 (7.6)
Record low °F (°C)	−4 (−20)	−5 (−21)	5 (−15)	13 (−11)	34 (1)	43 (6)	50 (10)	46 (8)	36 (2)	27 (−3)	17 (−8)	−2 (−19)	−5 (−21)
Average precipitation inches (mm)	3.56 (90)	2.87 (73)	4.47 (114)	3.85 (98)	3.23 (82)	3.54 (90)	3.97 (101)	4.26 (108)	4.31 (109)	4.08 (104)	3.18 (81)	3.99 (101)	45.31 (1,151)
Average snowfall inches (cm)	5.5 (14)	7.8 (20)	3.7 (9.4)	0.3 (0.76)	0 (0)	0 (0)	0 (0)	0 (0)	0 (0)	0 (0)	0.2 (0.51)	5.7 (14)	23.2 (58.67)
Average relative humidity (%)	73	75	72	72	75	74	73	71	73	73	71	75	73
Mean monthly sunshine hours	177	153	172	167	202	213	237	241	215	190	210	171	2,348
Average ultraviolet index	2	2	2	3	5	6	6	6	5	3	2	2	4
Source: NOAA; Weather Atlas

== Demographics ==
Historical population
Census	Pop.	Note	%±
2000	6,295		—
2010	6,577		4.5%
2020	6,747		2.6%
U.S. Decennial Census

=== 2020 census ===
At the time of the 2020 census, there were 6,747 people and 2,122 households in the CDP. The population density was 4,571.14 inhabitants per square mile (1,764.93/km^{2}). The racial makeup of the CDP was 49.11% White, 5.71% African American, 0.00% Native American, 33.26% Asian, 5.63% from other races, and 6.09% from two or more races. Hispanic or Latino of any race were 10.37%.

=== 2010 census ===
At the time of the 2010 census, there were 6,577 people in the CDP. The population density was 4,456.6 inhabitants per square mile (1,720.7/km^{2}). The racial makeup of the CDP was 66.00% White, 6.40% African American, 0.24% Native American, 20.74% Asian, 3.11% from other races, and 3.50% from two or more races. Hispanic or Latino of any race were 8.45%.

=== Census 2000 ===
At the time of the 2000 census, there were 6,295 people, 2,168 households, and 1,773 families in the CDP. The population density was 4,223.6 inhabitants per square mile (1,630.7/km^{2}). There were 2,226 housing units at an average density of 1,493.5 per square mile (576.6/km^{2}). The racial makeup of the CDP was 79.03% White, 6.45% African American, 0.11% Native American, 10.01% Asian, 2.00% from other races, and 2.40% from two or more races. Hispanic or Latino of any race were 6.45%.

Of the 2,168 households 39.1% had children under the age of 18 living with them, 65.8% were married couples living together, 12.5% had a female householder with no husband present, and 18.2% were non-families. 15.6% of households were one person and 8.9% were one person aged 65 or older. The average household size was 2.89 and the average family size was 3.21.

The age distribution was 26.7% under the age of 18, 5.8% from 18 to 24, 25.8% from 25 to 44, 25.7% from 45 to 64, and 15.9% 65 or older. The median age was 40 years. For every 100 females, there were 93.6 males. For every 100 females age 18 and over, there were 90.6 males.

The median household income was $84,705 and the median family income was $100,474. Males had a median income of $76,812 versus $38,343 for females. The per capita income for the village was $40,132. About 4.5% of families and 5.7% of the population were below the poverty line, including 8.4% of those under age 18 and 2.7% of those age 65 or over.

== Parks and recreation ==
Parks and recreation facilities within Roslyn Heights include:

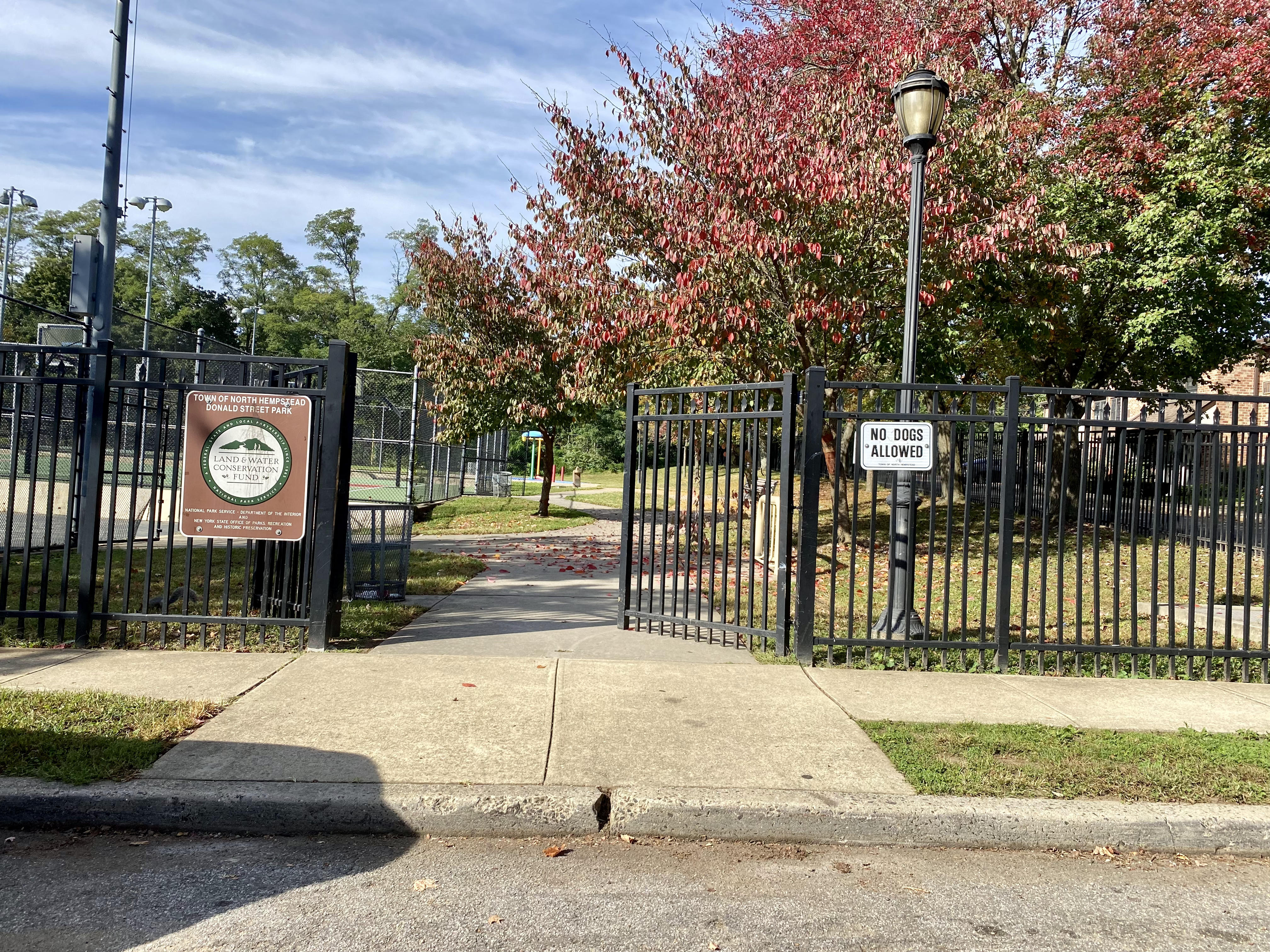
Donald Street Park in 2021

- Clark Botanic Garden
- Donald Street Park
- East Park
- Hector H. Gayle Roslyn Community Center
- North Park
- Shepherd Lane Playground
- Wheatley Hills Golf Club

== Government ==
=== Town representation ===
As Roslyn Heights is an unincorporated part of the Town of North Hempstead, it is directly governed by the town's government in Manhasset.

As of March 2022, Roslyn Heights is located within the Town of North Hempstead's 2nd council district, which as of March 2024 is represented on the North Hempstead Town Council by Edward Scott (R–Albertson).

=== Representation in higher government ===
On the county level, Roslyn Heights is split between Nassau County's 10th and 18th Legislative districts, which as of July 2026 are represented in the Nassau County Legislature by Mazi Melesa Pilip (R–Great Neck) and Samantha Goetz (R–Oyster Bay), respectively.

On the state level, Roslyn Heights is split between the New York State Assembly's 16th and 19th Assembly districts, and is located entirely within the New York State Senate's 7th State Senate district. As of July 2026, these districts are represented by Daniel J. Norber (R–Great Neck), Edward Ra (R–Garden City South), and Jack M. Martins (R–Old Westbury), respectively.

On the federal level, Roslyn Heights is located in New York's 3rd congressional district, which as of June 2026 is represented by Thomas R. Suozzi (D–Glen Cove). Like the rest of New York, it is represented in the United States Senate by Charles E. Schumer (D) and Kirsten E. Gillibrand (D).

=== Politics ===
In the 2024 U.S. presidential election, the majority of Roslyn Heights voters voted for Donald J. Trump (R).

== Education ==
=== School districts ===
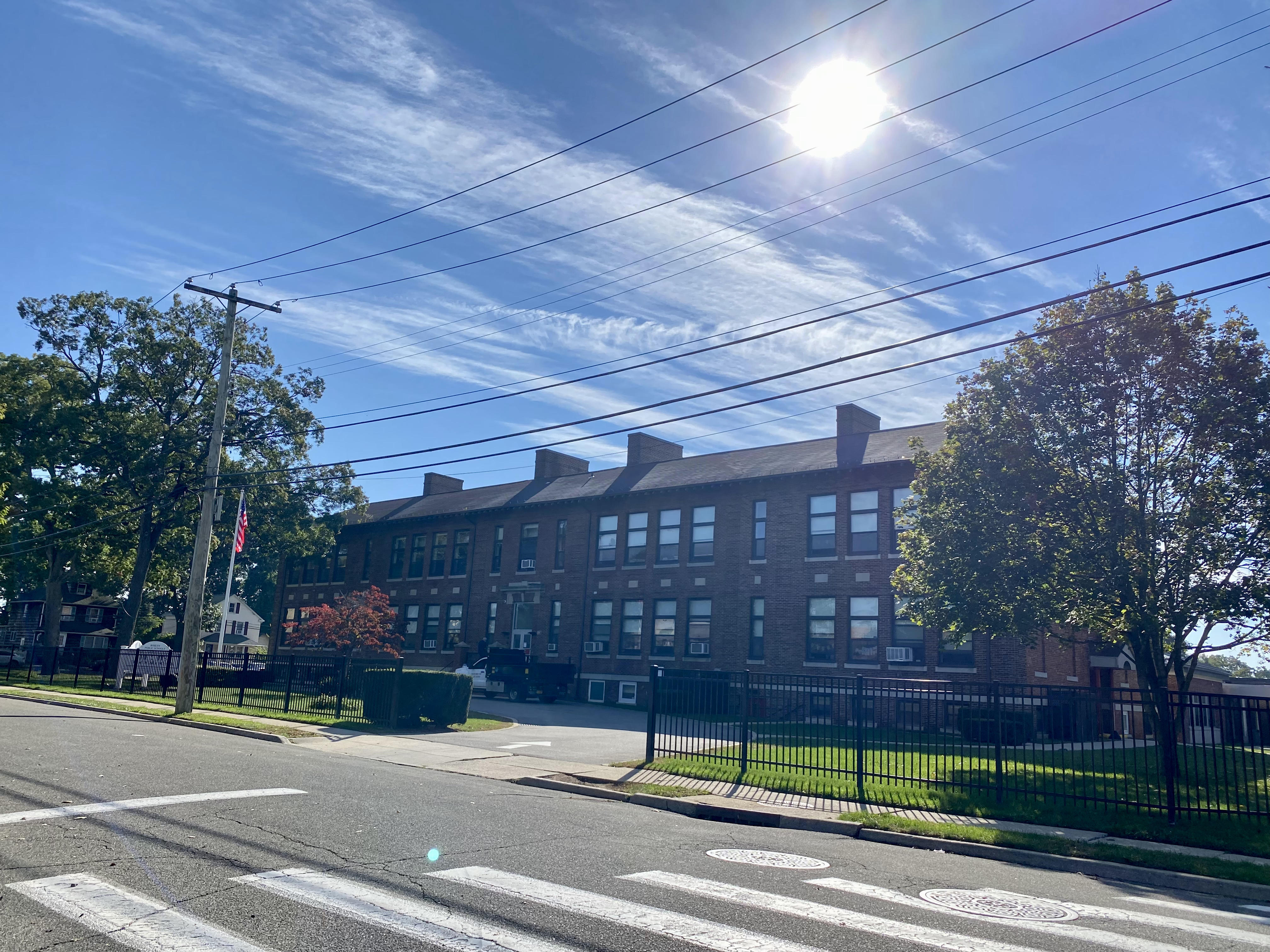
The Heights School – one of the Roslyn School District's three elementary schools

Most of Roslyn Heights is located within the boundaries of (and is thus served by) the Roslyn Union Free School District. However, smaller portions of the hamlet are located within the East Williston Union Free School District and the Herricks Union Free School District. Accordingly, children who reside within Roslyn Heights and attend public schools will go to school in one of these three districts depending upon where they live within the hamlet.

=== Library districts ===
Roslyn Heights is split between Roslyn's library district (which is served by the Bryant Library) and the Shelter Rock Library District (which is served by the Shelter Rock Public Library). The Bryant Library serves the areas of the hamlet within the Roslyn School District, and the Shelter Rock Library District serves the areas of the hamlet within the boundaries of the East Williston and Herricks school districts.

== Infrastructure ==
=== Transportation ===
==== Road ====
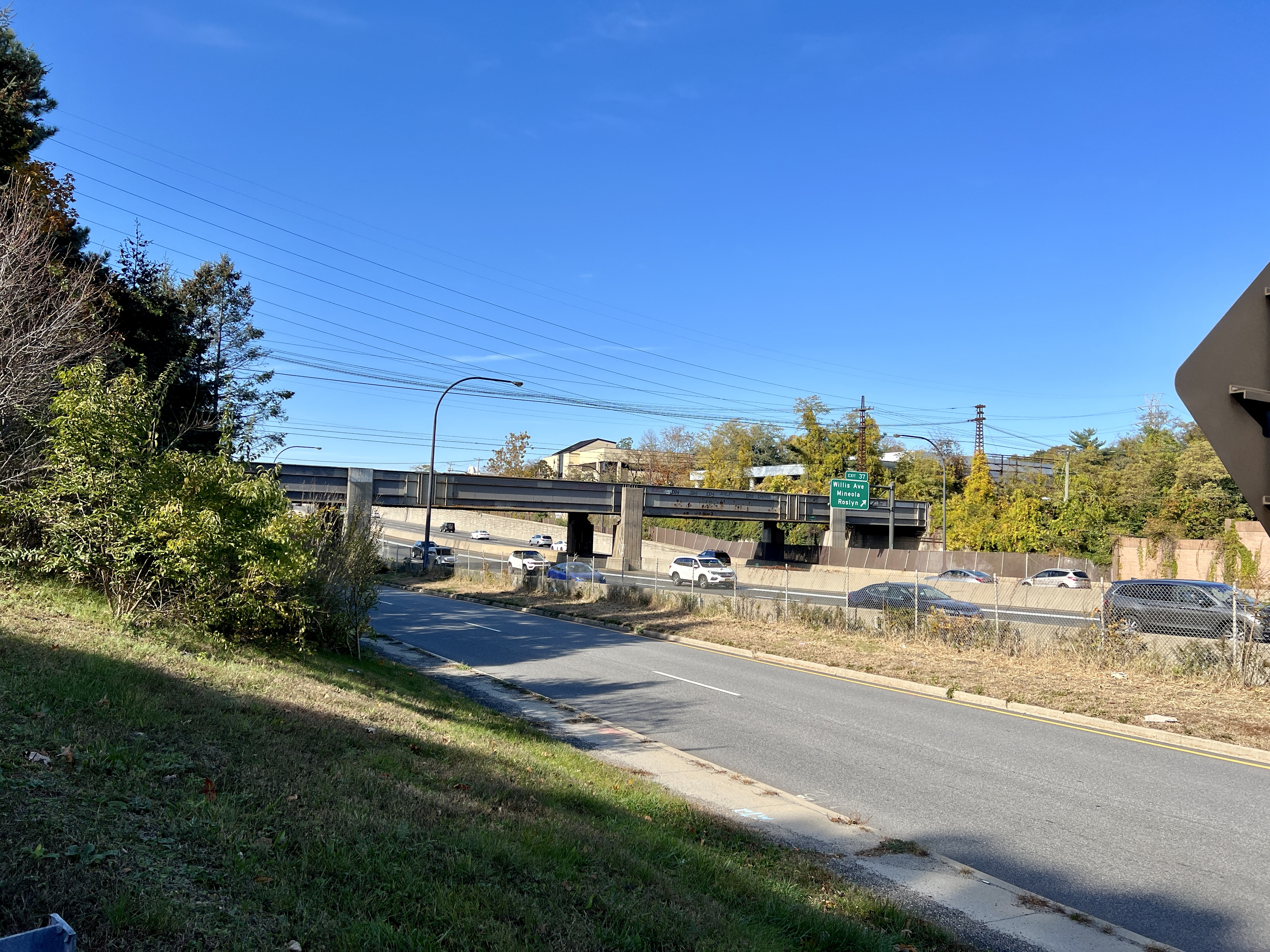
Interstate 495 within Roslyn Heights in 2021, looking towards the west

Two limited-access highways run through and serve Roslyn Heights:

- The Long Island Expressway (I-495) (exit 37)
- The Northern State Parkway (exits 28, 29, and 30)

Other major roads which pass through Roslyn Heights include Garden Street, Lincoln Avenue, Mineola/Willis Avenue, I.U. Willets Road, Locust Lane, Powerhouse Road, Roslyn Road, and Warner Avenue. Furthermore, the CDP's southernmost border touches New York State Route 25B.

==== Rail ====
Roslyn Heights is served by the Oyster Bay Branch of the Long Island Rail Road. Two stations are located either within or on the border of Roslyn Heights:

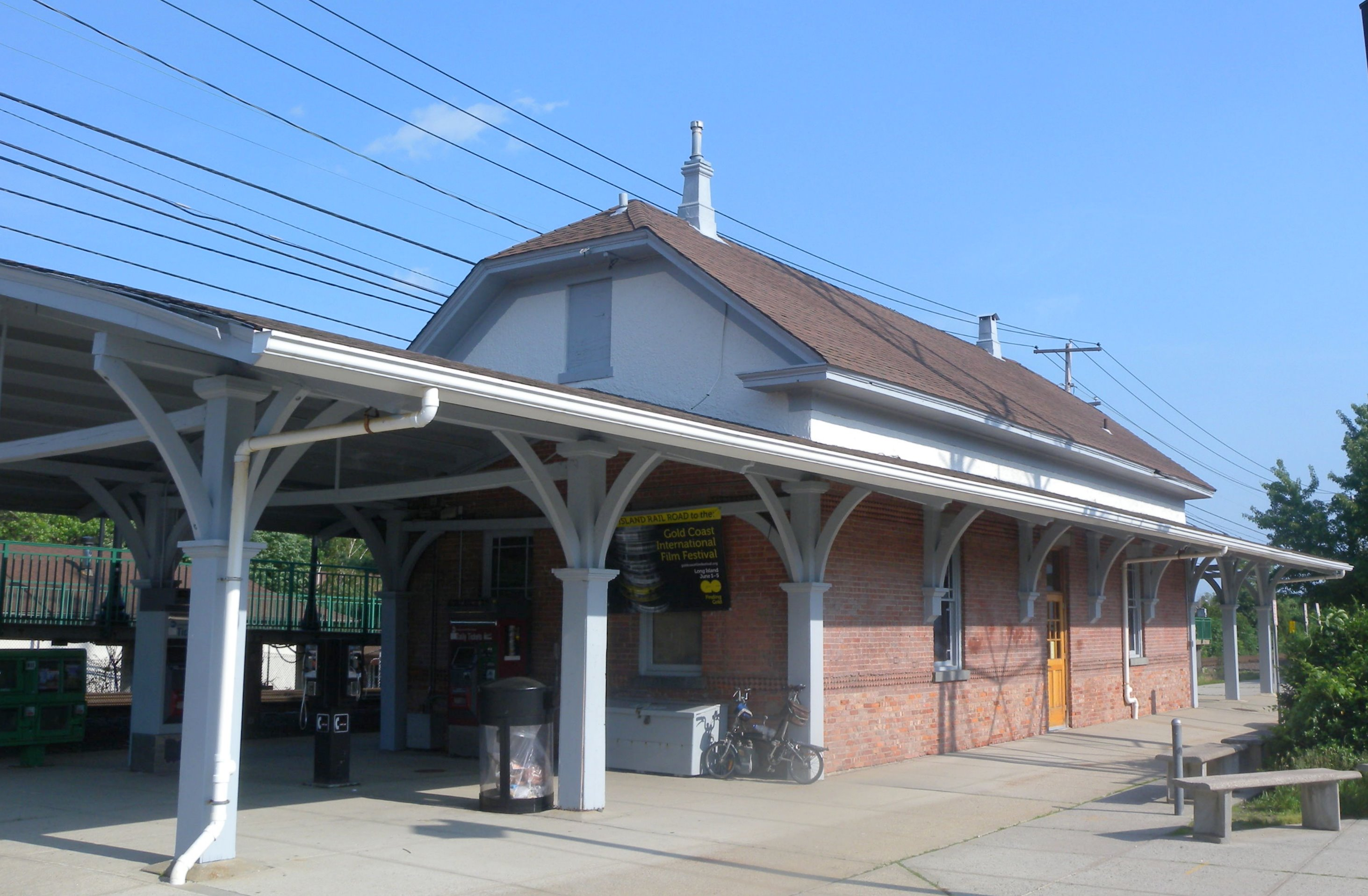
The Roslyn LIRR station's station house in 2011

- Roslyn (located in the heart of Roslyn Heights, just south of Lincoln Avenue)
- Albertson (located on the border between the hamlets of Albertson and Roslyn Heights, just north of I.U. Willets Road)

==== Bus ====
As of September 2025, Roslyn Heights is served by two Nassau Inter-County Express (NICE) bus routes:

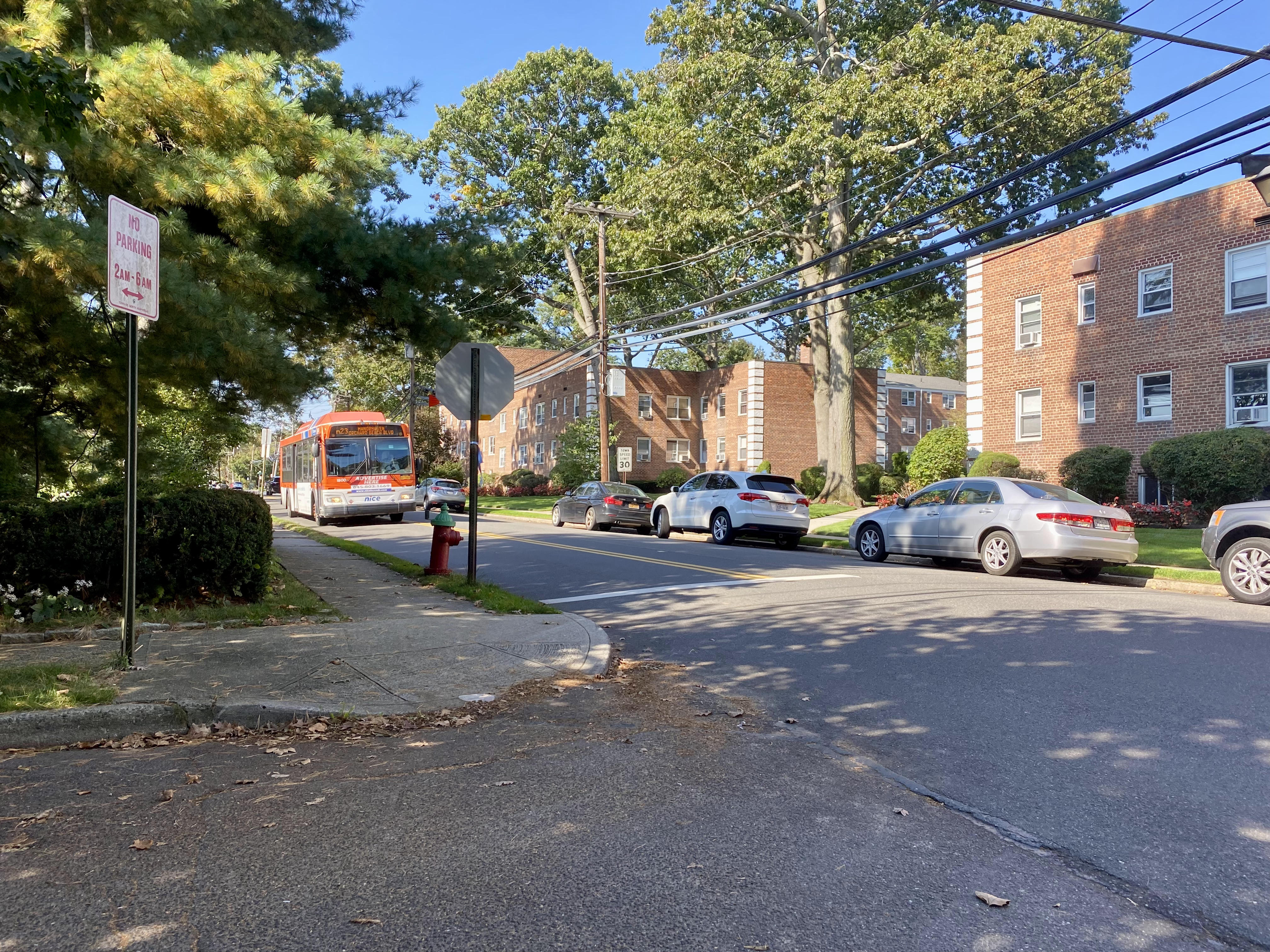
A Manorhaven-bound n23 bus on Warner Avenue at the northern end of the hamlet

- The n23 (Mineola–Manorhaven)
- The n27 (Hempstead–Glen Cove)

=== Utilities ===
==== Natural gas ====
National Grid USA provides natural gas to homes and businesses that are hooked up to natural gas lines in Roslyn Heights.

==== Power ====
PSEG Long Island provides power to all homes and businesses within Roslyn Heights, on behalf of the Long Island Power Authority.

==== Sewage ====
Roslyn Heights is partially sewered. The southern part of Roslyn Heights is within the Nassau County Sewage District. Another, smaller county sewer district exists in the Roslyn Plaza area of the CDP; it flows into the rest of Nassau County's sewer system via the East Hills Interceptor line, to be treated at the South Shore wastewater treatment plants.

The remainder of Roslyn Heights relies on cesspools and septic systems.

==== Water ====
The portion of Roslyn Heights north of the Northern State Parkway is located within the boundaries of (and is thus served by) the Roslyn Water District, the area of Roslyn Heights between the Northern State Parkway and the Wheatley Hills Golf Club is located within the boundaries of (and is thus served by) the Albertson Water District, and the portion of the Wheatley Hills Golf Club within Roslyn Heights is located within the boundaries of (and is thus served by) the Village of East Williston's municipal water system.

== Notable people ==
- Gary Ackerman – Former Democratic Congressman for New York State's 5th congressional district.
- Thomas Benton Ackerson – Real estate developer who founded the T. B. Ackerson Company.
- Eric Asimov – Dining reporter for The New York Times.
- Emile Zola Berman (1902–1981) – litigator whose defense roster included Sirhan Sirhan.
- Rick Berman – Hollywood producer and screenwriter.
- Alison Bernstein – Historian and Ford Foundation program officer.
- Hazel Nell Dukes – Civil rights activist.
- John Giorno (1936–2019) – Artist and poet.
- Rick Hoffman (born 1970) – Actor.
- Salman Khan – Actor and producer.
- Kenneth G. Langone – Billionaire businessman and co-founder of Home Depot; grew up in Roslyn Heights.
- Shep Messing – Olympic soccer goalkeeper and current broadcaster.
- Chris Miller – Author and co-writer, Animal House.
- John Pierpont Morgan – Banker, financier, and art collector; founder of J.P. Morgan & Co.
- Christopher Morley - Author
- Larry Nagler (born 1940) – Tennis player, 1960 NCAA Tennis Singles Champion and Doubles Champion.
- Mike Pollock (born 1965) – Voice actor.
- Darren Rovell (born 1978) – Sports business analyst.
- Van Toffler – President of MTV.
- Harry Wachtel (1917–1997) – Lawyer and businessman.
- Fred Wilpon – Owner of the New York Mets.
- Jeff Wilpon – Chief Operating Officer of the New York Mets.
- Richard Zimler – Novelist.

== In popular culture ==
Scenes for the 2018 film, The Week of, were filmed within Roslyn Heights – specifically, at the Powerhouse Road–Roslyn Road intersection, at the Roslyn Heights–East Hills border.

== See also ==
- Village of Roslyn
- Town of North Hempstead
