= Clark Botanic Garden =

Park in Albertson, New York

Coordinates: 40.7722°N 73.6398°W

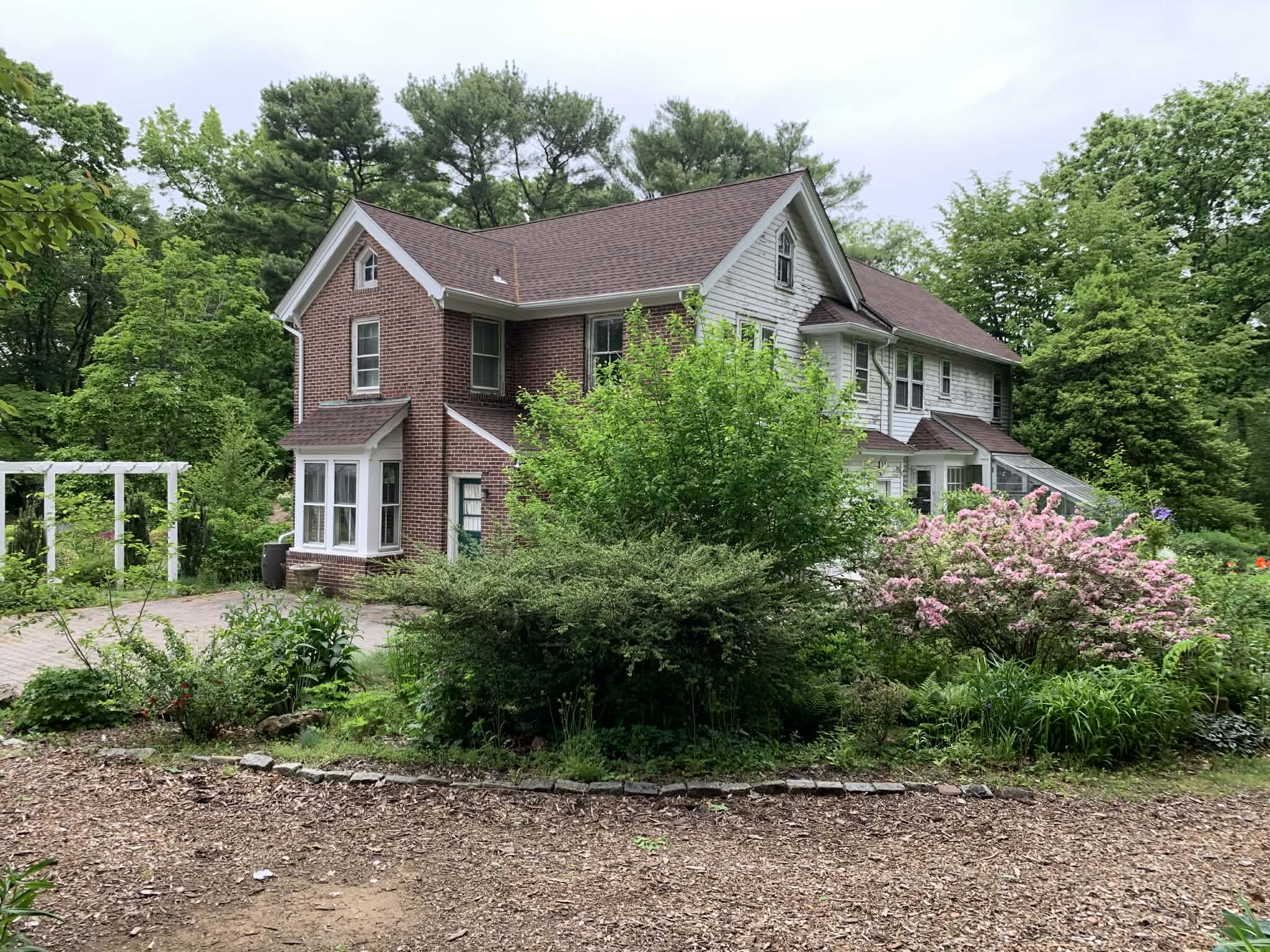
- Main mansion at Clark Botanic Garden in 2026
- Interactive map of Clark Botanic Garden
- Type: Botanical garden and park
- Location: Roslyn Heights, New York, U.S.
- Area: 12 acres (4.9 ha)
- Established: 1969 (57 years ago)
- Owner: Town of North Hempstead

Clark Botanic Garden (also known as Clark Memorial Garden) is a 12-acre (4.9 ha) botanical garden and park in Roslyn Heights, New York, United States.

== Description ==
The garden, designed by garden designer Alice Recknagel Ireys, was established in 1969 on the former estate of Grenville Clark, an attorney, writer, and advisor to President Franklin Delano Roosevelt. In 1966, Clark donated his home, a stately farmhouse dating back to the 1890s, to the Brooklyn Botanic Garden. The site now contains approximately 5,000 species of plants, with over 1,000 labeled trees, shrubs, and garden plants arranged in 12 specialty gardens. Collections include native wildflowers, conifers, roses, perennials, daylilies, wetland plants, rock garden plants, herbs, butterfly plants, and medicinal plants.

There are two ponds and a small gift shop on the grounds, as well as a community gardening area. The garden is now owned by the Town of North Hempstead and operated by a non-profit organization. It is open to the public with no admission charge. Occasionally, concerts or other special events are held on the grounds. During the summer months, free compost is sometimes available to local residents.

=== Location ===
Although the Clark Botanic Garden uses an Albertson mailing address, it is located within the boundaries of the adjacent hamlet, Roslyn Heights.

== See also ==
- List of botanical gardens in the United States
