= East Williston Union Free School District =

School district in the U.S. state of New York

Address
- 11 Bacon Road Old Westbury, New York, 11568; United States

District information
- Type: Public
- Grades: K–12
- NCES District ID: 3610050

Students and staff
- Students: 1,666 (2020–2021)
- Teachers: 193.47 (on an FTE basis)
- Staff: 155.13 (on an FTE basis)
- Student–teacher ratio: 8.61:1

Other information
- Website: www.ewsdonline.org

The East Williston Union Free School District (abbreviated as EWSD and also known as East Williston Union Free School District No. 2 – and known colloquially as Wheatley Schools) is a school district located within the south-central portion of the Town of North Hempstead in Nassau County, on Long Island, in New York, United States.

== Overview ==
The East Williston Union Free School District serves all of the Incorporated Village of East Williston, along with portions of Roslyn Heights, the Village of East Hills, Village of Mineola, and the Village of Old Westbury.

As of 2024, the Superintendent of Schools is Dr. Danielle Gately.

== History ==
The school district was established in its current form in 1949, after the East Williston Common School District's residents voted 196-to-16 in favor of re-establishing it as the Union Free School District No 2. The district subsequently grew in the 1950s.

In 1955, The Wheatley School – the district's sole high school – was established.

In 1960, a proposal to consolidate the East Williston Union Free School District and the adjacent Carle Place Union Free School District failed, due to a lack of support for the centralization. This came after a previous attempt at consolidating the two with the Mineola and Herricks Union Free School Districts.

In 1970, the district changed its name from Union Free School District No. 2 to East Williston Union Free School District No. 2, at the request of the New York State Department of Education, so to better distinguish it from the other districts throughout the state known as UFSD No. 2. Although it initially submitted the name "Wheatley Union Free School District No. 2," given the large colloquial usage, NYSED rejected the name due to there being no community therein formally named Wheatley. In light of this decision, the district opted to use the East Williston Union Free School District No. 2 name.

== Schools ==
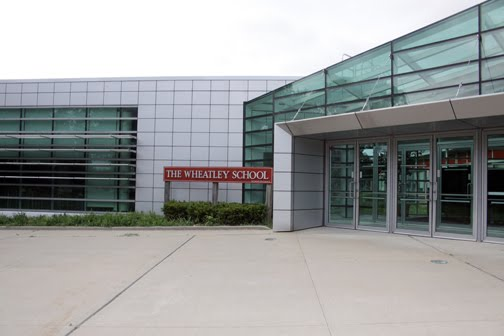
The main entrance to The Wheatley School

The East Williston Union Free School District operates of three schools:

- North Side Elementary School (grades K - 4)
- Willets Road Middle School (grades 5-7)
- The Wheatley School (grades 8-12)

== Sports ==
Wheatley features many sports and extracurricular teams and clubs. The football and lacrosse teams are shared with the neighboring Herricks Union Free School District for football and Carle Place Union Free School District for lacrosse.

== See also ==
- List of school districts in New York
- Mineola Union Free School District
