= County Route E64 (Nassau County, New York) =

County highway in Nassau County, New York

- CR E64, highlighted in red

Route information
- Maintained by NCDPW
- Length: 4.51 mi (7.26 km)

Major junctions
- South end: Old Country Road (CR 25) in Mineola
- NY 25 in Mineola; NY 25B in Williston Park; I.U. Willets Road in Albertson; Northern State Parkway in Roslyn Heights; I-495 in Roslyn Heights
- North end: NY 25A and Center Drive in Flower Hill

Location
- Country: United States
- State: New York
- County: Nassau

Highway system
- County routes in New York; County Routes in Nassau County

County Route E64 is a major, 4.51-mile (7.26 km) county road between the Incorporated Villages of Mineola and Flower Hill, in Nassau County, on Long Island, New York. It is owned by Nassau County and maintained by the Nassau County Department of Public Works.

The portion of the CR E64 south of the Long Island Expressway (Interstate 495) is known as Willis Avenue, while the portion from the Long Island Expressway north to Northern Boulevard (NY 25A) is known as Mineola Avenue. The portion of the road in Roslyn Heights is honorably named Langone Brothers Avenue, after two local firefighters killed on September 11, 2001.

A small, bypassed section of Willis Avenue exists in Albertson as a local street; this original alignment is now known as Old Willis Avenue.

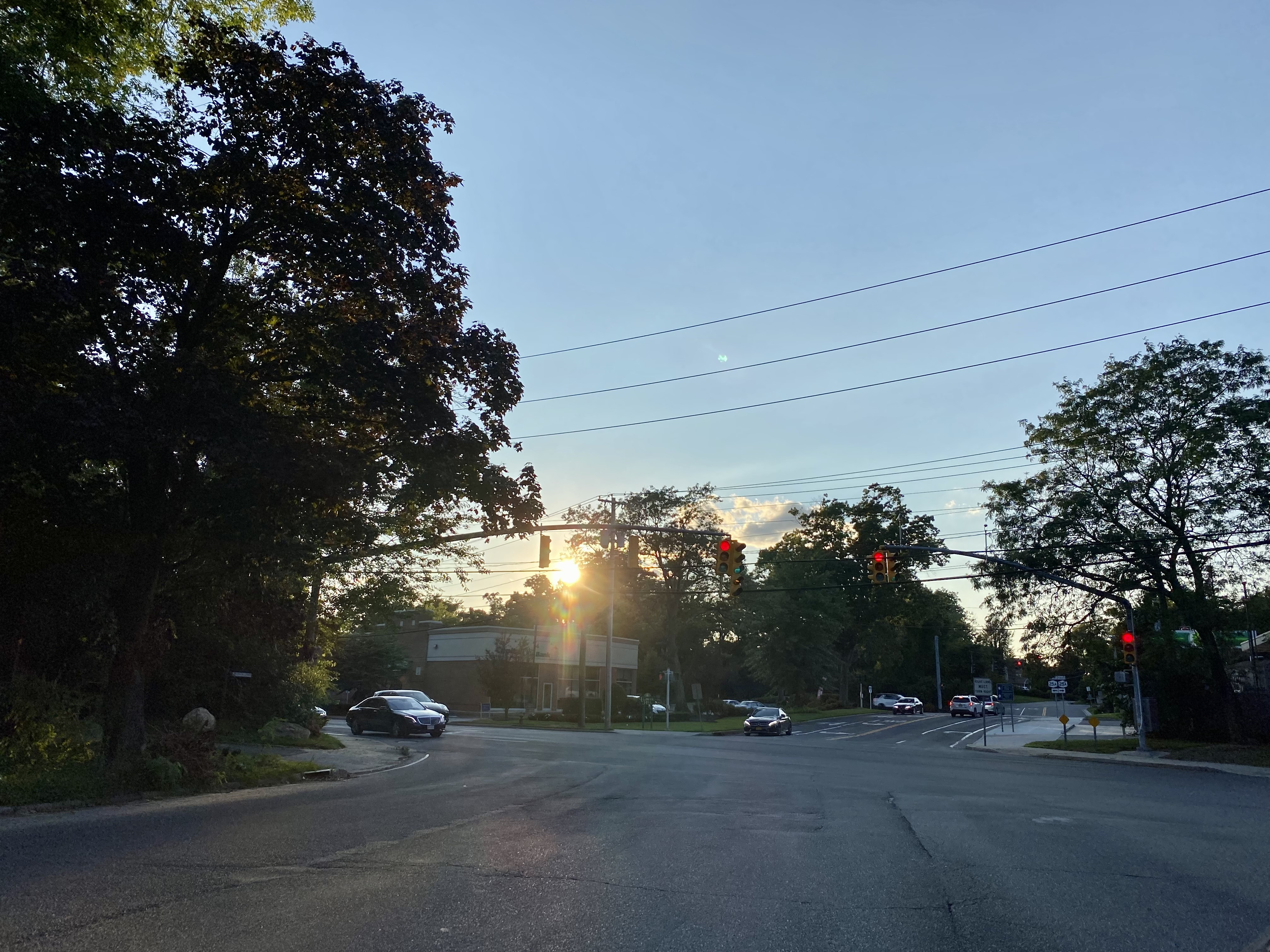
Mineola Avenue at Old Northern Boulevard (CR D71), Looking north in 2021.

== Route description ==
CR E64 begins as Willis Avenue at Old Country Road (CR 25) in Mineola. It travels north-northwest underneath the Long Island Rail Road's Main Line and Oyster Bay Branch, then intersecting Second Street (CR E23) shortly thereafter. It then continues and intersects First Street (CR C78) one block to the north-northwest. It then continues straight, eventually intersecting Jericho Turnpike (NY 25). It then continues straight, towards the north-northwest, soon entering the Incorporated Village of Williston Park and intersecting Hillside Avenue (NY 25B). From there, CR E64 continues north through Williston Park, passing and crossing the former route of the Long Island Motor Parkway before entering Albertson. Still continuing north, CR E64 soon intersects I.U. Willets Road in Albertson. It then continues north and north-northeast through Albertson, eventually reaching and crossing underneath the Northern State Parkway; Willis Avenue enters Roslyn Heights at this location. It continues north-northeast, soon reaching and crossing underneath the Long Island Expressway (I-495), and intersecting with its service roads (Powerhouse Road) at-grade, interchanging with the Long Island Expressway via Exit 37.

At Powerhouse Road and the Long Island Expressway, the name of the road changes to Mineola Avenue and turns northwest through Roslyn Heights, eventually reaching Garden Street, and then reaching Warner Avenue one block north, before reaching Hillside Avenue one block later. From there, CR E64 continues northwest, forming the municipal border between the Incorporated Village of Roslyn and the Incorporated Village of Roslyn Estates, gently meandering its way to Old Northern Boulevard (CR D71) at the Flower Hill–Roslyn–Roslyn Estates tripoint. The road then enters the Incorporated Village of Flower Hill, continuing north to Northern Boulevard (NY 25A), where the county route designation terminates. North of this intersection, the road becomes Center Drive – a residential street owned and maintained by the Village of Flower Hill.

=== Old Willis Avenue ===
Old Willis Avenue is a short, 0.18-mile (0.29 km) roadway in Albertson, from just north of Nassau Drive to Yale Street; it is a former alignment of Willis Avenue. Both ends of Old Willis Avenue merge back into the current, newer alignment of Willis Avenue.

== History ==
In 1906, portions of Willis Avenue were used as part of the course for the 1906 Vanderbilt Cup.

In the 1960s, there was a proposal to link Willis Avenue in Mineola with Hempstead Avenue (CR D09) in West Hempstead, by way of an abandoned Long Island Rail Road right-of-way through the Incorporated Villages of Garden City and Hempstead. The 2.9-mile (4.7 km) highway extension, which was to be known as County Boulevard, was estimated at the time to cost $9.5 million (1963 USD). Two options were to either have the whole route constructed at-grade – or for the road to be built as a surface road through Garden City, and as a depressed expressway through Hempstead; the latter option was cited in 1968 as having an estimated cost of $23 million. Nassau County, in announcing the proposal, stated that the construction of County Boulevard would ease cross-county travel by providing a direct link between Merrick Road (CR 27) to the south and Northern Boulevard (NY 25A) to the north. The proposal was eventually called off due to strong local opposition and pushback from residents and officials in both villages.

Following the September 11, 2001 terrorist attacks, a portion of Mineola Avenue in Roslyn Heights was honorably named Langone Brothers Avenue, in honor of local residents Peter and Thomas Langone. The two brothers, who were volunteer firefighters for the Roslyn Rescue Fire Department, responded to the fire at the World Trade Center following that attacks; both brothers were killed when the Twin Towers collapsed. The honorary name was approved and dedicated by the Nassau County Legislature in September 2003.

In 2021, Willis Avenue's grade crossings with the Long Island Rail Road's Main Line and Oyster Bay Branch were eliminated, as part of the Long Island Rail Road's Third Track Project. As part of the reconstruction project, Willis Avenue was lowered in the area to run underneath the tracks, thus eliminating the two grade crossings, which frequently caused congestion and safety hazards along that portion of the road. The elimination of Willis Avenue's two grade crossings – along with others in Mineola – had been proposed by New York State for decades, but had been pushed back and stalled due to community opposition and cost overruns.

CR E64 was formerly designated CR 71, prior to the route numbers in Nassau County being altered. It, along with all of the other county routes in Nassau County, became unsigned in the 1970s, when Nassau County officials opted to remove the signs as opposed to allocating the funds for replacing them with new ones that met the latest federal design standards and requirements, as per the federal government's Manual on Uniform Traffic Control Devices.

== Major intersections ==
Location	mi	km	Destinations	Notes
Mineola	0.00	0.00	Old Country Road (CR 25)	
Mineola	0.21	0.34	Second Street (CR E23)	
Mineola	0.67	1.08	Washington Avenue	
Mineola	0.72	1.16	NY 25 (Jericho Turnpike) – New York, Orient Point	At-grade intersection
Williston Park	1.25	2.01	NY 25B (Hillside Avenue) – New York, Westbury	At-grade intersection
Albertson	2.27	3.65	I.U. Willets Road	
Albertson	2.98	4.80	Princeton Street	
Albertson–Roslyn Heights line	3.12	5.02	Northern State Parkway – New York, Hauppauge	Exit 28 on Northern State Parkway; no commercial vehicles allowed
Roslyn Heights	3.24	5.21	I-495 – New York, Riverhead	Access via North and South Service Roads; Exit 37 on I-495; Willis Avenue becomes Mineola Avenue at this location
Roslyn Heights	3.75	6.04	Warner Avenue	
Roslyn–Roslyn Estates– Roslyn Heights tripoint	3.82	6.15	Hillside Avenue	
Flower Hill–Roslyn– Roslyn Estates tripoint	4.45	7.16	Old Northern Boulevard (CR D71)	
Flower Hill	4.51	7.26	NY 25A (Northern Boulevard) – New York, Calverton	Route designation ends; continues north as Center Drive
1.000 mi = 1.609 km; 1.000 km = 0.621 mi: Route transition

== See also ==
- List of county routes in Nassau County, New York
- Glen Cove Road
- Old Country Road
