= Nassau County Sewage District =

Coordinates: 40°45′46″N 73°33′9″W

District overview
- Type: Sewage treatment
- Status: Active
- Headquarters: Nassau County, New York, United States
- Website: www.nassaucountyny.gov/1865/Public-Works

The Nassau County Sewage District is a public sewer district in Nassau County, on Long Island, in New York, United States. It is owned by Nassau County and as of 2026 is operated under contract by Suez North America.

== Description ==
The Nassau County Sewage District serves large portions of Nassau County.

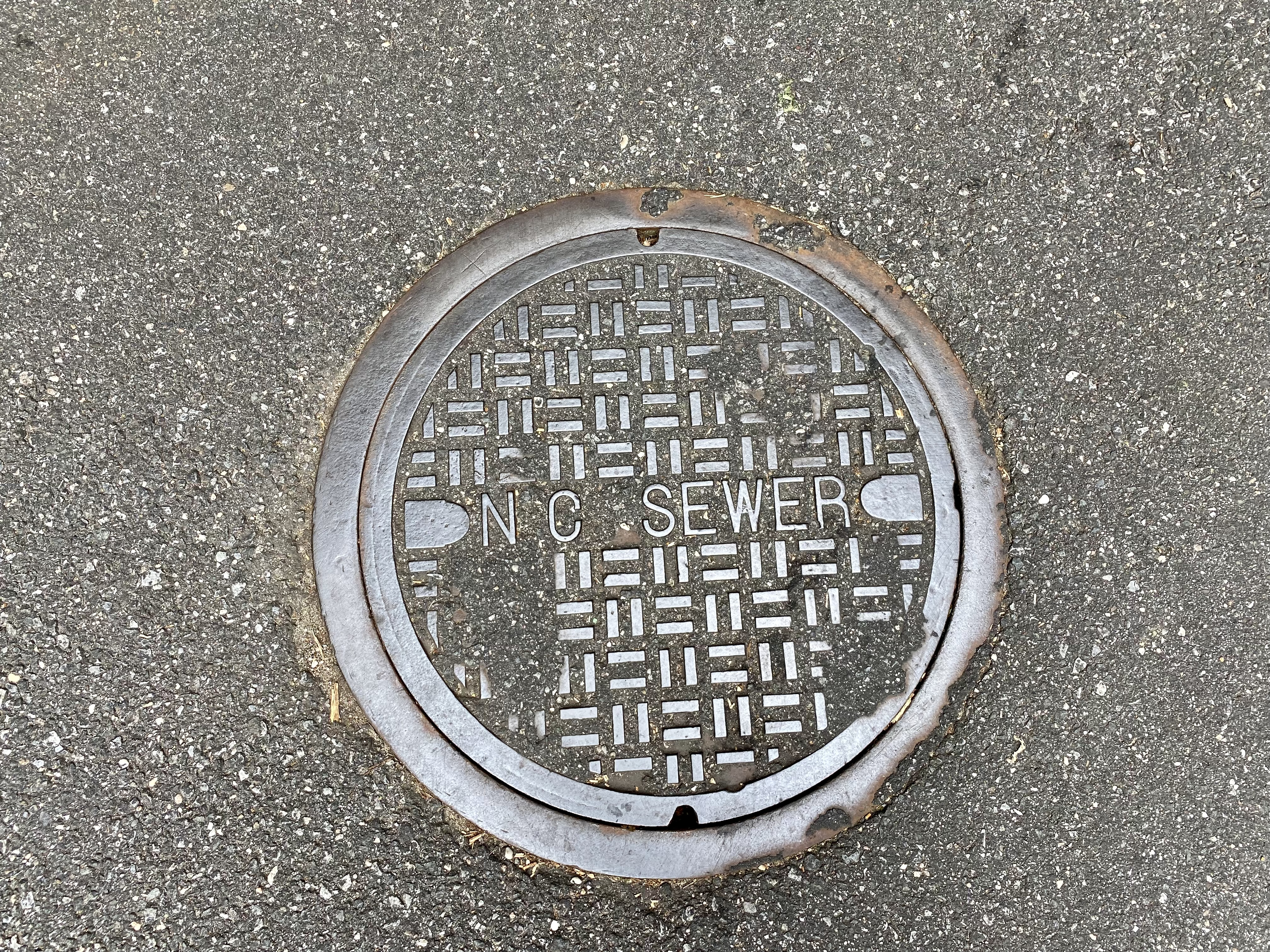
A Nassau County Sewage District manhole cover in Roslyn Estates in 2021

In the first quarter of the 21st century, the Nassau County Sewage District assumed control of the City of Glen Cove's sanitary sewer system.

Nassau County's sanitary sewer system handles roughly 85% of sewage in Nassau County. The other 15% is handled by smaller, independent water pollution control districts (i.e.: the Port Washington Water Pollution Control District).

The Nassau County Sewage District also treats sanitary sewage from other, independent systems (i.e.: the Village of Roslyn's sanitary sewer system, which is treated by Nassau County's facilities via the line known as the East Hills Interceptor, which travels from Roslyn Heights to the main part of the Nassau County network in Westbury by means of Roslyn Road, the North Service Road, and Old Westbury Road).

=== Gaps in service area ===
Although the heavy majority of Long Island's South Shore within Nassau County is connected to Nassau's sewer system, large portions of the North Shore in Nassau County remain unsewered and rely on cesspools and septic systems.

There were failed attempts made in the 1970s to extend Nassau County's sewer system into North Shore communities which either partially or completely lacked sewers, including but not limited to: East Hills, Flower Hill, Munsey Park, Plandome, Roslyn Harbor, and Sands Point. The project failed in large part due to public opposition.

== Specifications ==
- Number of Nassau County Sewage District sewage treatment plants (excluding Glen Cove): 2 (Bay Park and Cedar Creek).
- Percentage of sewage handled in Nassau County: Approximately 85%.
- Network length: Approximately 3,000 miles (4,800 km).
