= Herricks Union Free School District =

School district in the U.S. state of New York

Coordinates: 40°45′35.3″N 73°39′41.5″W

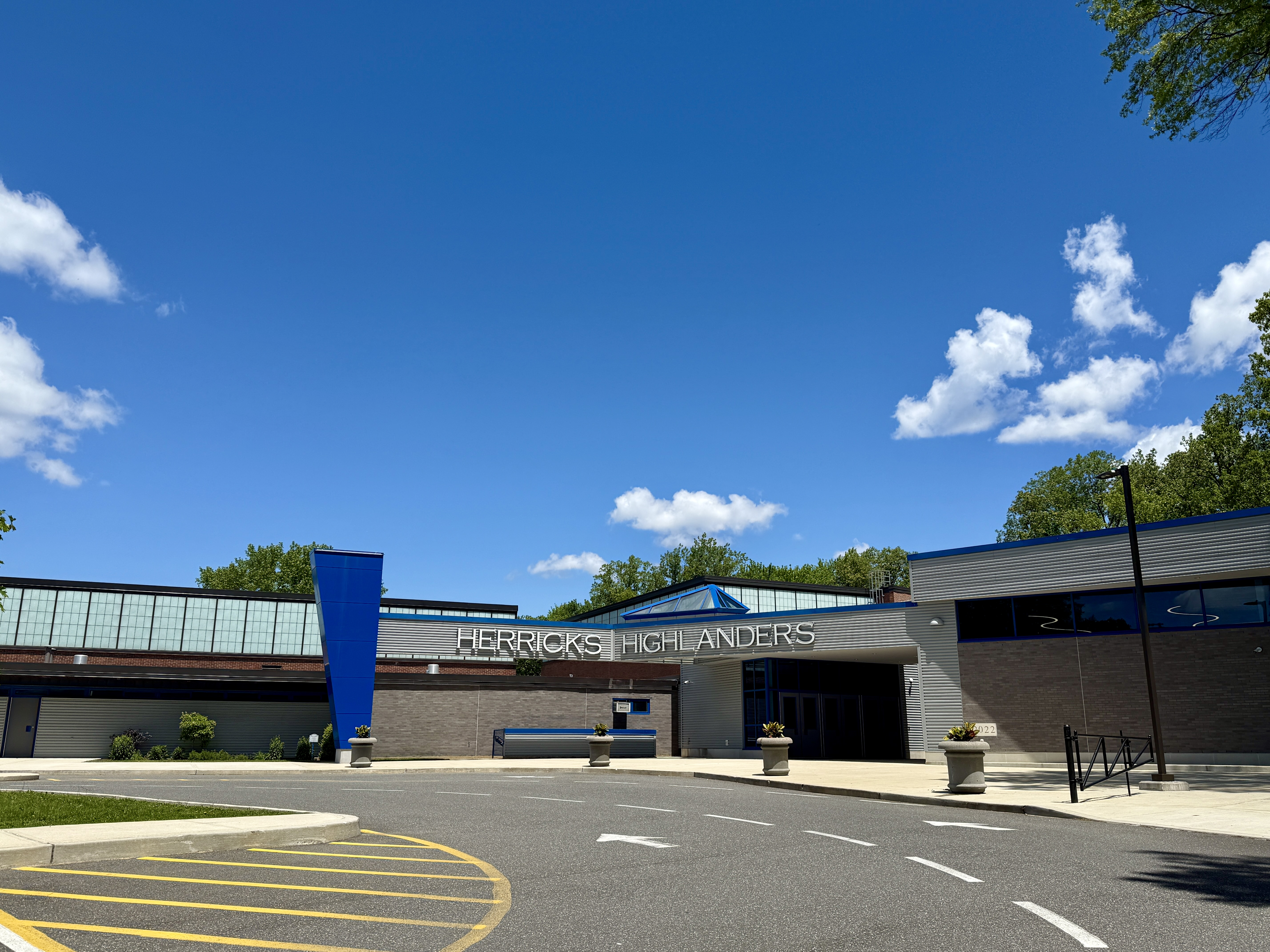
- A Herricks Highlander sign above an entrance to Herricks High School
- 999B Herricks Road, New Hyde Park, New York 11040

District information
- Motto: "Education Today, Knowledge Forever"
- Established: 1813
- Superintendent: Dr. Tony Sinanis

Other information
- Website: www.herricks.org

The Herricks Union Free School District (also known as Union Free School District No. 9 and Herricks Public Schools) is an American public school district located in western Nassau County, on Long Island, in New York.

The Herricks School District lies within the Greater New Hyde Park area and serves a number of communities therein – including all of Herricks and Searingtown, in addition to portions of Albertson, Garden City Park, Manhasset Hills, North Hills, and Williston Park.

== History ==
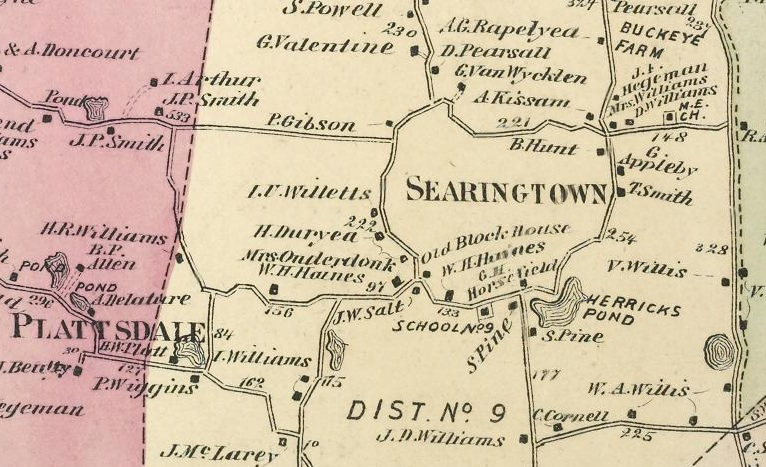
This 1873 map shows the location of the school in District No. 9 (Herricks), which at the time was the only school in the district.

The school in Herricks was established in 1813, making it one of the oldest in Nassau County. It was named for Herricks Path – a path in the area that existed as early as 1659. By 1898, the Herricks School was one of Nassau County's last remaining one-room schools.

The Herricks Community Center is located just south of the High School. It once served as the junior high school before the current one was built.

Herricks High School, located atop Watermelon Hill, opened in 1958. The land near the school was a burial ground for the Pearsall family starting in the 17th century, but the burial grounds were later removed. The school had its first graduating class in 1960.

The Herricks Union Free School District celebrated its 200th anniversary in 2013.

=== Supreme Court case ===
The Herricks School District was made famous for its role in the 1962 United States Supreme Court case, Engel v. Vitale. Known as the "Herricks Prayer Case," the events began in 1959, when the Herricks School District – also known as Union Free School District No. 9 – was sued by five district property owners. The Herricks Board of Education ordered for the following prayer to be recited as a daily procedure in all district schools, on the recommendation of the New York State Board of Regents:

"Almighty God, we acknowledge our dependence upon Thee, and we beg Thy blessings upon us, our parents, our teachers and our Country."

The U.S. Supreme Court, upon hearing the case, ruled the prayer unconstitutional in 1962, effectively barring public schools from reciting state-sponsored prayers.

== Schools ==
=== Current ===
As of 2025, the Herricks UFSD operates the following schools:

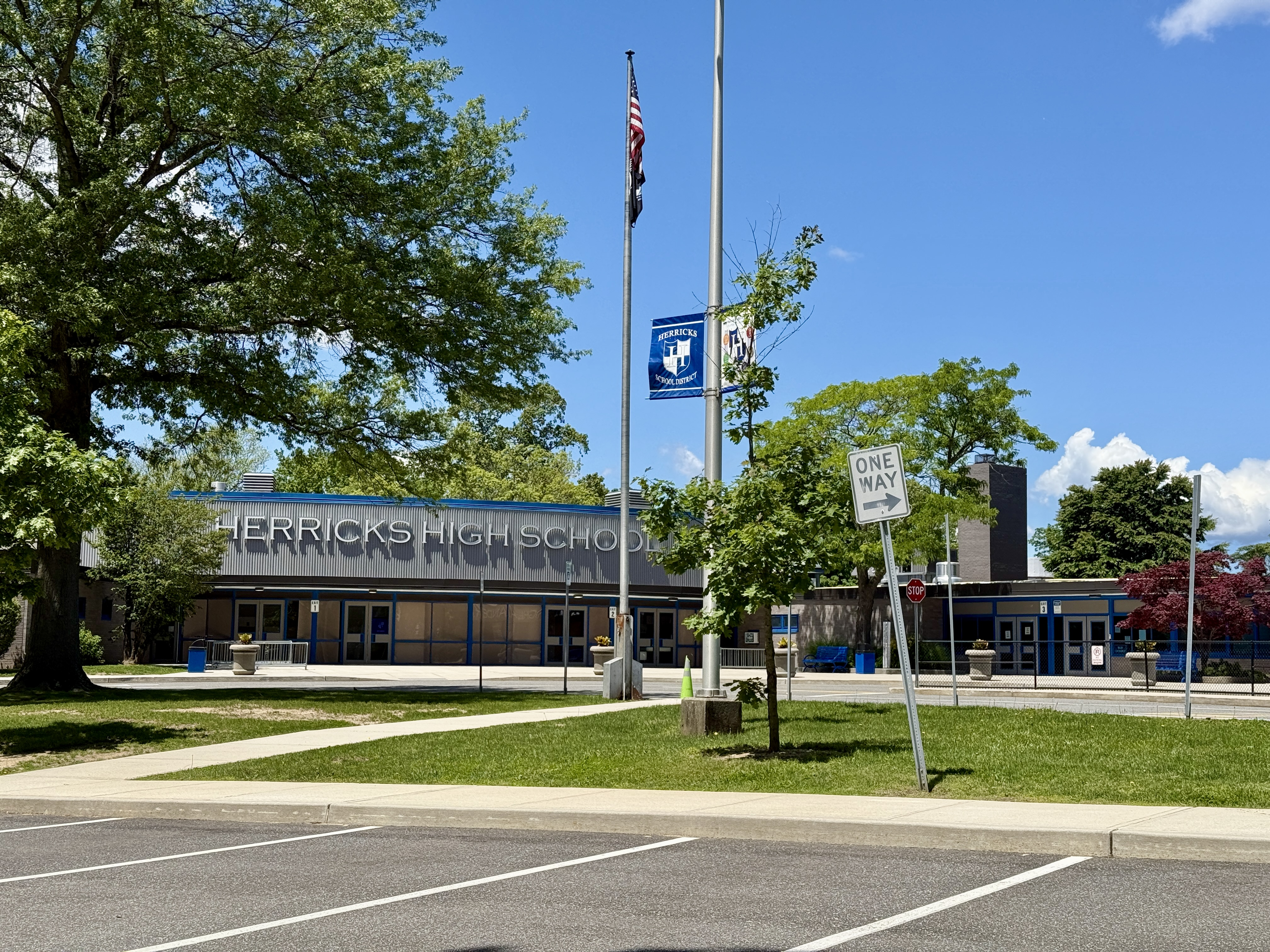
Herricks High School in May 2025

==== Secondary schools ====
- Herricks High School
- Herricks Middle School

==== Elementary schools ====
- Denton Avenue Elementary School
- Center Street Elementary School
- Searingtown Elementary School

=== Former ===
- The Herricks Community Center (1925 - 1948) was the junior high school building before the current; it currently also serves as the District's administrative offices.

== Administration ==
As of November 2022, the Superintendent of the Herricks Union Free School District is Dr. Tony Sinanis, the Assistant Superintendent for Instruction is Elizabeth Guercin, the Assistant Superintendent for Business is Lisa Rutkoske, C.P.A., and the Assistant Superintendent for Human Resources is Dina Maggiacomo.

== See also ==
- School districts in New York
- Engel v. Vitale
