= Roslyn station (LIRR) =

Long Island Rail Road station in Nassau County, New York

Roslyn
- Roslyn's station house in 2026

General information
- Location: Lincoln Avenue & Railroad Avenue; Roslyn Heights, NY
- Coordinates: 40.79072°N 73.64327°W
- Owner: Long Island Rail Road
- Line: Oyster Bay Branch
- Distance: 22.2 mi (35.7 km) from Long Island City
- Platforms: 2 side platforms
- Tracks: 2
- Connections: Nassau Inter-County Express: n23, n27 OurBus

Construction
- Parking: Yes
- Cycle facilities: Yes
- Accessible: Yes

Other information
- Station code: RSN
- Fare zone: 7

History
- Opened: January 23, 1865
- Rebuilt: 1887, 1988, 1997

Passengers
- 2012–14: 968 per weekday
- Rank: 78 out of 126

Services
Preceding station	Long Island Rail Road	Following station
Albertson toward Penn Station, Jamaica or Long Island City	Oyster Bay Branch	Greenvale toward Oyster Bay
Former services
Preceding station	Long Island Rail Road	Following station
Albertson toward Mineola	Oyster Bay Branch	North Roslyn toward Oyster Bay
Location

Roslyn is a station on the Oyster Bay Branch of the Long Island Rail Road. It is located at Station Plaza at Lincoln and Railroad Avenues – west of Roslyn Road (CR 7) and south of Warner Avenue – in Roslyn Heights, Nassau County, New York, United States.

== History ==
=== 19th century ===
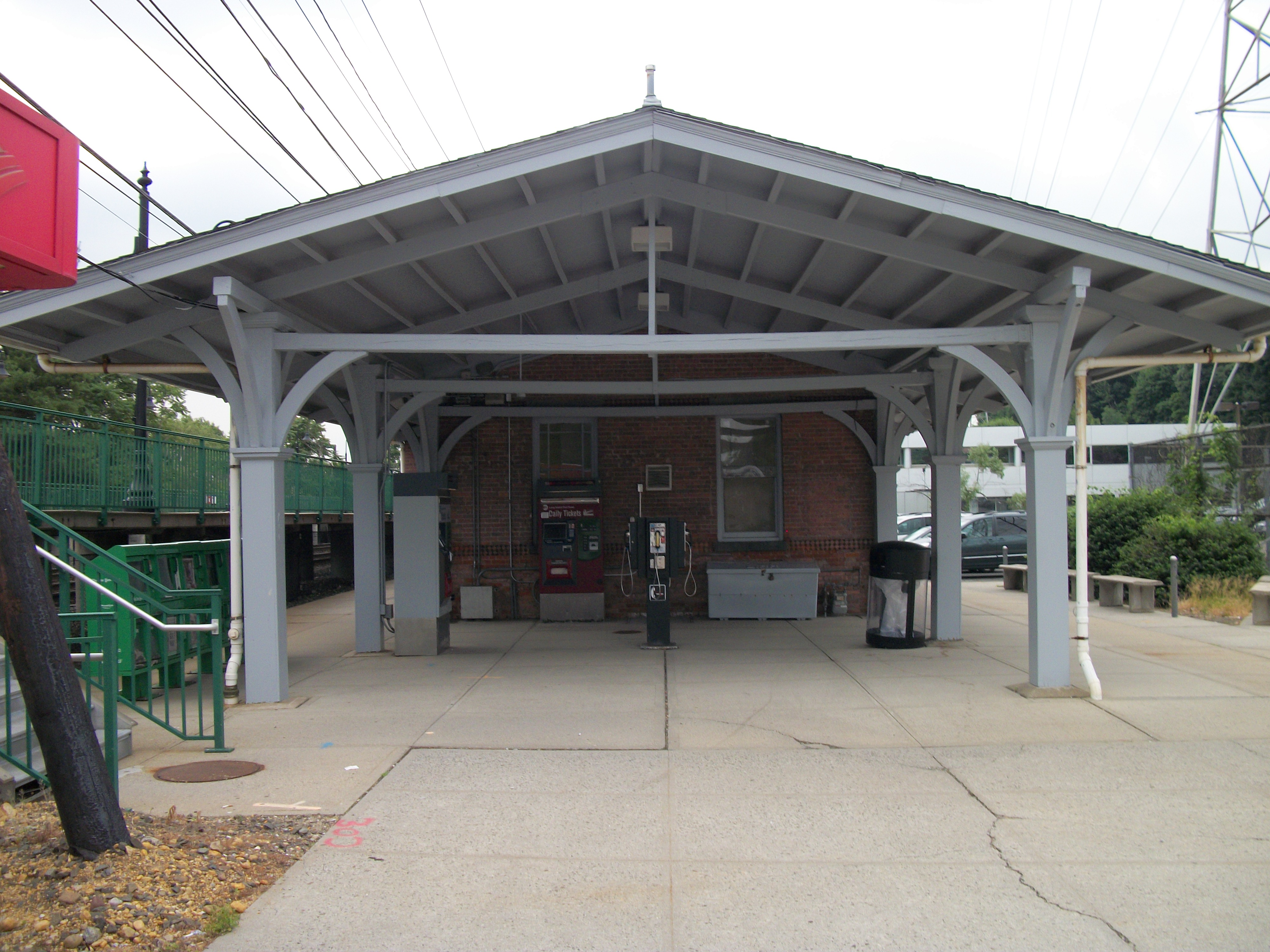
The station building's southern canopy – once used to shelter horse-drawn carriages

Roslyn station opened on January 23, 1865, by the Glen Cove Branch Rail Road – a subsidiary of the Long Island Rail Road, upon the completion of the line between Mineola and Glen Head. The land for the railroad station was donated by Samuel Adams Warner – a prominent architect and Roslyn resident for whom nearby Warner Avenue is named.

In 1882, the LIRR attempted to extend the former Flushing and North Side Railroad main line from the Great Neck station to the Roslyn station. This proposal dates back to an F&NS subsidiary, called the "Roslyn and Huntington Railroad"; the ultimate plan was to link all North Shore rail lines with a bypass of the LIRR's Main Line. This extension proposal ultimately failed, and that line was instead extended to its current terminus in nearby Port Washington via Manhasset in 1898; meanwhile, the Oyster Bay Branch was extended from Locust Valley to Oyster Bay in 1889.

The Roslyn station was moved in 1885, in order to accommodate the construction of a new freight station; the station was rebuilt between June and July 1887.

By the end of the 19th century, new residential and commercial development had started to spring up in the area immediately surrounding the station, spurred by its presence.

=== 20th century ===
In 1905, a second track along the Oyster Bay Branch was constructed between Albertson and Roslyn. Four years later, in 1909, the second track was further extended from Roslyn to Glen Cove; the second track was constructed in anticipation of the Oyster Bay Branch being electrified past East Williston, north and east to the line's eastern terminus in Oyster Bay.

In 1907, New York & North Shore Traction Company's Port Washington Line opened, with a major stop located at the Roslyn LIRR station. This electric trolley service continued to stop at – and serve – the Roslyn station until 1920, when the NY&NS ceased all operations and went out of business after suffering from a financial collapse; as of 2026, the n23 bus route – operated as part of the Nassau Inter-County Express bus network – follows much of this former trolley line's route.

On the evening of July 15, 1927, an Oyster Bay-bound express train struck a vehicle which had stalled in the middle of the former Orchard Street grade crossing, in front of the station. The collision led to the vehicle being knocked into a telephone pole, and the two occupants of the vehicle were ejected from the impact. The driver, identified as Jacob Bolzicot, sustained critical injuries and was taken to Nassau County Hospital in Mineola. The other occupant, Catherine – Bolzicot's 4-year-old daughter, was uninjured.

In 1940, the Long Island Rail Road remodeled the exterior of the station house, covering the brick façade with stucco, which resulted in public outcry. Roslyn Estates resident Christopher Morley, who regularly used the station for his commutes between Roslyn and New York City, called for the Long Island Rail Road remove the stucco and re-expose the brickwork. The Long Island Rail Road, which was looking to improve the station due to increasing ridership, soon agreed to remove the layer of stucco and re-expose the bricks – a process which was completed early that November.

On the evening of May 5, 1967, a man was struck and fatally injured by an oncoming, Oyster Bay-bound train at the Roslyn station while he was crossing the tracks. The victim, identified as Greenvale resident Hugh O'Rourke, was on his way home at the time of the incident. O'Rourke was transported to North Shore University Hospital in Manhasset, where he was pronounced deceased from his injuries.

The station house was restored to its 19th-century origins in 1981, during a major restoration project. The Roslyn Landmark Society assisted in the restoration project, and donated many of the materials used.

Between the 1960s and the 1980s, the area surrounding the station underwent a large-scale urban renewal project. As part of the project, a number of derelict buildings – in addition to portions of the abandoned freight yard – were demolished and replaced with a 250-car parking lot for the station. The project also saw the station be moved to the south side of Lincoln Avenue; the historic station house was moved to this new location in the fall of 1988, and continues to stand at this new location today.

When the station was moved to its current location, the Village of Roslyn expressed interest in moving the station's historic platform shelter into Roslyn's downtown to ensure its preservation; the structure, by that time, was used as a taxi stand. The shelter, built in 1928, was moved in 1987 to the site of the Captain Jacob M. Kirby Storehouse on Main Street, where it remains standing as a garden house.

In 1997, in anticipation of the LIRR's fleet of C3 bilevel railcars entering service, the Metropolitan Transportation Authority once again reconstructed the station by replacing the existing low-level platforms with new high-level ones, allowing for level boarding (which the new railcars required) – and making the station wheelchair accessible and otherwise compliant with the Americans with Disabilities Act of 1990.

=== 21st century ===
Between 2016 and 2017, the station's parking lot was re-striped and received additional parking spaces. The project was carried out by the Town of North Hempstead, which owns and maintains the parking lot.

In 2020, the Town of North Hempstead received a $150,000 grant from Nassau County to construct a pathway connecting the station's east end to the residential area adjacent to it; as no connection existed there between the street & platform, despite the street being adjacent to the Oyster Bay-bound platform, residents were required to walk north multiple blocks to access the station at its north end.

In April 2025, the historic station building was temporarily closed for extensive renovations. As part of this project, the exterior would receive a historically-accurate restoration, and the interior would additionally be renovated and modernized with improved designs and amenities. Work was in the fall of 2026. Platform upgrades were also completed as part of this project – including the installation of new lighting, signage, and other components.

In 2026, the Roslyn Landmark Society and the MTA partnered to create a permanent photographic history gallery of the rail transportation in the Roslyn area inside the station's renovated waiting room, as part of the station rehabilitation project. Work on installing the gallery was complete by October 2026.

==== Transit-oriented development ====
In 2021, the Village of Roslyn approved plans to construct a mixed-use, transit-oriented development on Warner Avenue adjacent to the station, on the site of an older, single-story shopping strip building. This transit-oriented development, known as Bryant Plaza, includes 54 rental apartments, in addition to 12,000 square feet (1,100 m^{2}) of retail and restaurant space on the ground floor.

Bryant Plaza was developed by JK Equities in conjunction with Century Realty Investors, and the building was designed by Mojo Stumer Associates.

== Station layout ==
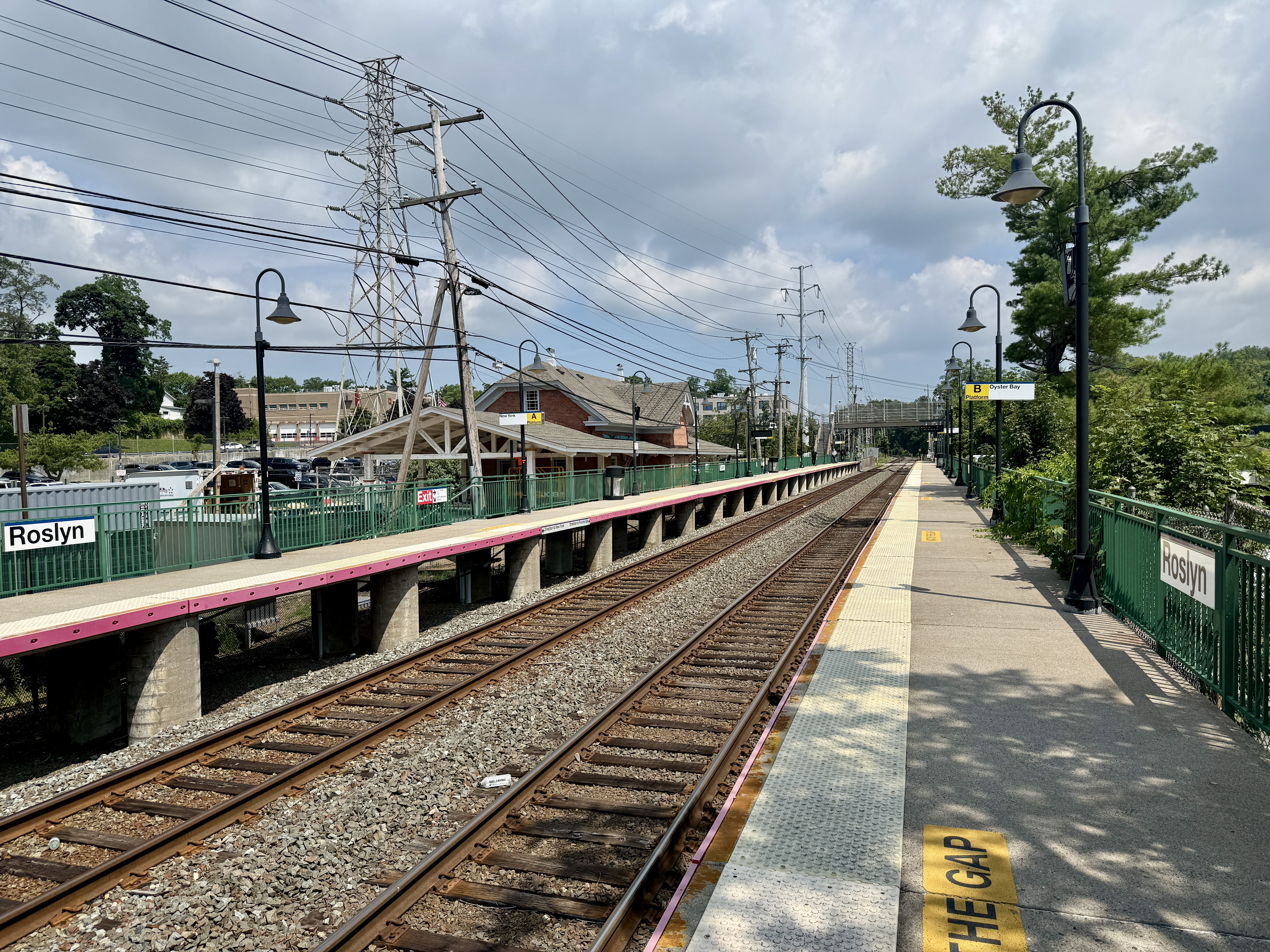
The station platforms in 2026

The Roslyn station consists of two tracks, located at grade level. It has two high-level side platforms, each being long enough to accommodate four train cars. A pedestrian crossover linking the two platforms passes over the tracks.

=== Parking ===
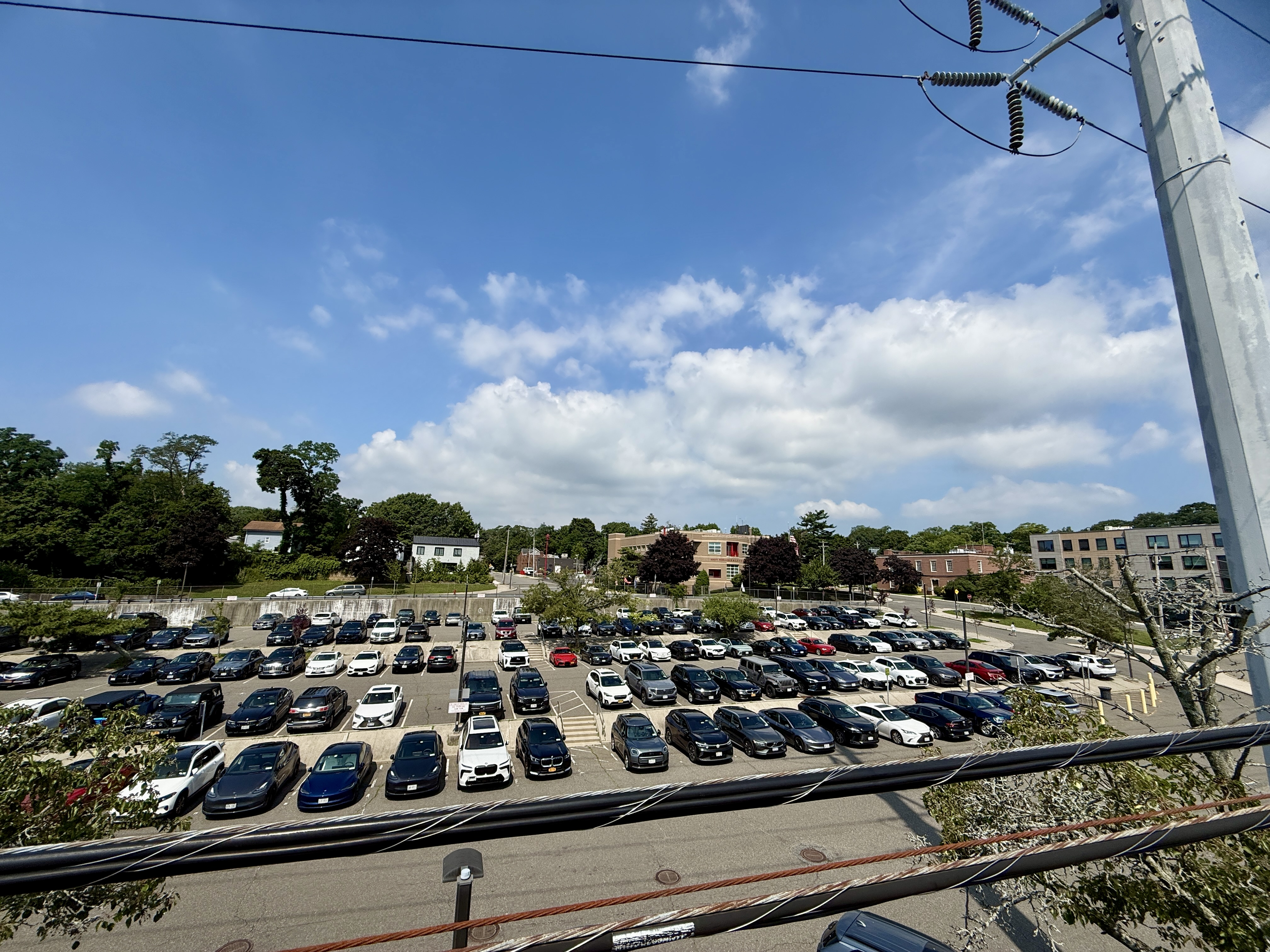
The parking lot at the station in 2026

Free parking is available in the commuter parking lot located on the west side of the Roslyn station. This lot can accommodate in excess of 200 parked vehicles. The station's parking lot is owned, operated, and maintained by the Town of North Hempstead.

== See also ==
- History of the Long Island Rail Road
- List of Long Island Rail Road stations
- Albertson station
- Greenvale station
- North Roslyn station
