= Greenvale station =

Long Island Rail Road station in Roslyn Harbor, Nassau County, New York

Greenvale
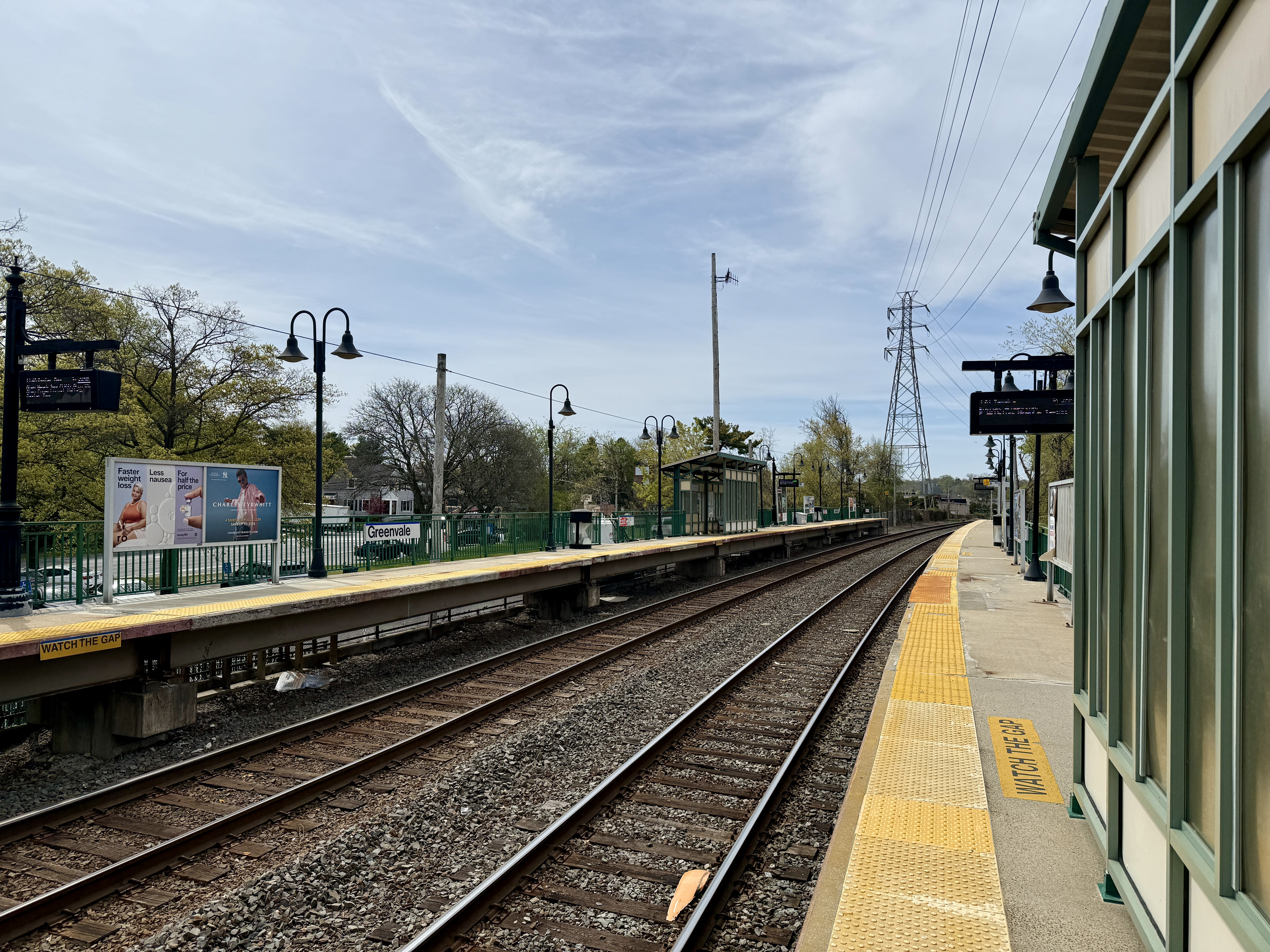
- The Greenvale station in 2025, looking south

General information
- Location: Between Glen Cove Avenue & Plaza Road north of Helen Street; Roslyn Harbor, NY
- Coordinates: 40.815547°N 73.626916°W
- Owner: Long Island Rail Road
- Line: Oyster Bay Branch
- Distance: 24.2 mi (38.9 km) from Long Island City
- Platforms: 2 side platforms
- Tracks: 2
- Connections: Nassau Inter-County Express: n27

Construction
- Parking: Yes; Village of Roslyn Harbor Permits and Metered Parking
- Cycle facilities: Yes
- Accessible: Yes

Other information
- Station code: GVL
- Fare zone: 7

History
- Opened: 1866 (freight only); 1875, 1880s (passenger service)
- Rebuilt: 1890s, 1997
- Former names: Week's

Passengers
- 2012–14: 237 per weekday
- Rank: 106 out of 126

Services
Preceding station	Long Island Rail Road	Following station
Roslyn toward Penn Station, Jamaica or Long Island City	Oyster Bay Branch	Glen Head toward Oyster Bay
Former services
Preceding station	Long Island Rail Road	Following station
North Roslyn toward Mineola	Oyster Bay Branch	Glen Head toward Oyster Bay
Location

Greenvale (formerly known as Week's) is a station on the Long Island Rail Road's Oyster Bay Branch. The station is located off Helen Street, between Glen Cove Avenue and Glen Cove Road within the Village of Roslyn Harbor, in Nassau County, New York, United States.

== History ==
The Greenvale station was originally established by the Glen Cove Branch Rail Road – a subsidiary of the Long Island Rail Road which opened the year prior between Mineola and Glen Head – on July 21, 1866, as "Week's station," a freight-only station primarily used for delivering milk. Passengers were briefly allowed at the station in 1875, and then again sometime during the 1880s. At some point, the station was renamed "Greenvale."

The passenger station has never existed as anything else other than a sheltered platform. On May 17, 1891, it was demolished by a locomotive that collided with a horse whose hoof was stuck in the switching apparatus; the collision resulted in the deaths of the horse and the two crew members. The station was subsequently rebuilt.

In 1921, it was announced that the sparsely-used North Roslyn station – a flag stop located roughly 2/3 mile (1.1 km) to the south of Greenvale – would close. In turn, the Greenvale station would receive additional service and facilities; Greenvale – unlike North Roslyn – had room to accommodate such expansions, with lots nearby being available for purchase. That station closed on March 16, 1924.

=== Modern history ===
New shelters were built on both sides of the tracks in 2000 on high-level platforms that were installed in 1997 to make the station compliant with the Americans with Disabilities Act of 1990 and compatible with the Long Island Rail Road's then-new C3 bilevel railcars, which could not serve low-level platforms.

== Station layout ==
The Greenvale station is located partially at ground level and partially built on an embankment. It has two tracks, as well as two high-level side platforms – each long enough to accommodate four cars.

=== Parking ===
A permit parking lot (requiring a Village of Roslyn Harbor resident or non-resident parking permit) for commuters is located on the west side of the Greenvale station. An additional commuter parking lot on the east side contains additional village permit parking – plus a section with metered, unrestricted parking (where no permits are required).

All of the parking facilities at the Greenvale station are operated and maintained by the Village of Roslyn Harbor.

== See also ==
- History of the Long Island Rail Road
- List of Long Island Rail Road stations
- Roslyn station (LIRR)
- Albertson station
- North Roslyn station
