= North Roslyn station =

Train station in New York, US (1897–1924)

North Roslyn

General information
- Location: Roslyn Harbor
- Coordinates: 40.80790°N 73.63561°W
- Owner: Long Island Rail Road
- Line: Oyster Bay Branch

Other information
- Station code: None

History
- Opened: June 17, 1897
- Closed: March 16, 1924
- Former names: Wheatley Hills (1897–1901)

Former services
Preceding station	Long Island Rail Road	Following station
Roslyn toward Mineola	Oyster Bay Branch	Greenvale toward Oyster Bay
Location

North Roslyn is a former railroad station on the Oyster Bay Branch of the Long Island Rail Road, located within the present-day Village of Roslyn Harbor in Nassau County, on the North Shore of Long Island, in New York, United States.

== Overview ==
The North Roslyn station was located in what is now the Village of Roslyn Harbor, at the former intersection of the North Hempstead Turnpike (NY 25A) and Motts Cove Road South. This location is currently the site of the entrance to the Nassau County Museum of Art.

A very limited amount of information is known about the former station.

== History ==
The station was originally opened on June 17, 1897 as Wheatley Hills and was renamed as North Roslyn in 1901. It was initially announced that all trains en route to Oyster Bay would stop at the station – although the station operated as a flag stop throughout its existence. The land was donated by Brooklyn-based Johnston Bros., and various members of the Meadow Brook Hunt Club who resided near the new station financially contributed to its construction and equipment.

In January 1902, local residents and commuters signed a petition requesting that increased service be provided at the station by the Long Island Rail Road, by having an additional five trains stop there.

The North Roslyn station was used by few passengers, with most locals instead opting to use the nearby Greenvale station, located roughly 2/3 mile (1.1 km) to the north. On April 22, 1921, the New York Public Service Commission gave the LIRR permission to close the North Roslyn station and increase service at Greenvale. There was no opposition to the closure and consolidation, which had been consented to and requested by local residents, provided that Greenvale would see additional service and improved facilities. At the time, the North Roslyn station saw limited, flag-stop service from seven trains per day – and, unlike Greenvale, its facilities were unable to be expanded due to the absence of available parcels for such work.

North Roslyn closed as a station on March 16, 1924.

== See also ==
- List of Long Island Rail Road stations
- Mill Neck station
