= Glen Head station =

Long Island Rail Road station in Nassau County, New York

Glen Head
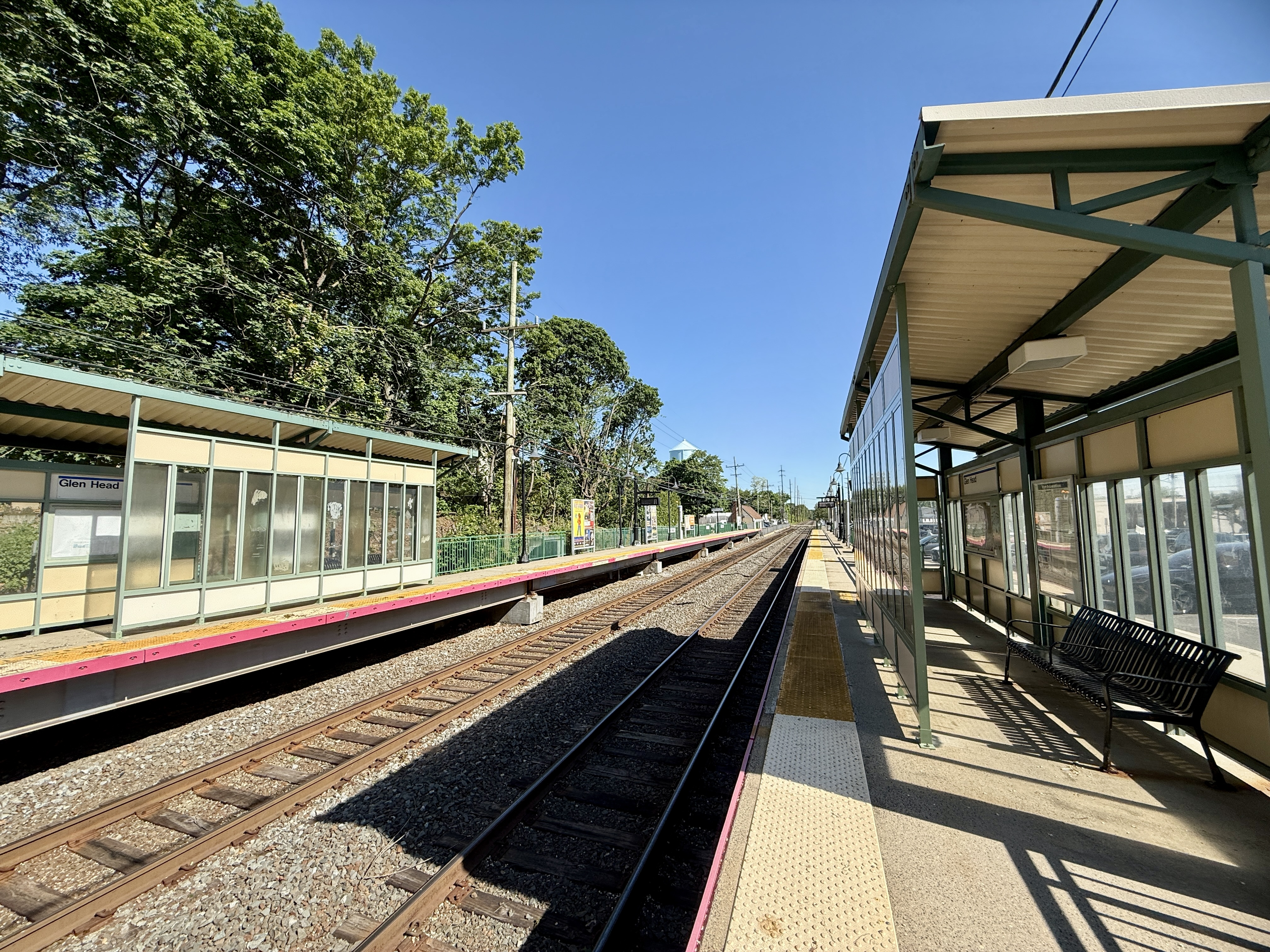
- Glen Head station in 2025

General information
- Location: Glen Head Road & School Street; Glen Head, New York
- Coordinates: 40.832284°N 73.626128°W
- Owner: Long Island Rail Road
- Line: Oyster Bay Branch
- Distance: 25.4 mi (40.9 km) from Long Island City
- Platforms: 2 side platforms
- Tracks: 2
- Connections: Nassau Inter-County Express: n27 (four blocks west on Glen Cove Avenue)

Construction
- Parking: Yes
- Accessible: Yes

Other information
- Station code: GHD
- Fare zone: 7

History
- Opened: January 23, 1865
- Rebuilt: 1888, 1961

Passengers
- 2012—2014: 657 per weekday
- Rank: 88 out of 126

Services
| Preceding station | Long Island Rail Road | Following station |
|---|---|---|
| Greenvale toward Penn Station, Jamaica or Long Island City | Oyster Bay Branch | Sea Cliff toward Oyster Bay |
Location

Glen Head is a station on the Oyster Bay Branch of the Long Island Rail Road. It is located at Glen Head Road (Glenwood Road) and School Street in Glen Head, in Nassau County, New York, United States.

Parking is available at the station between Glen Head Road and Locust Avenue on the east side of the tracks – as well as between Glen Head Road and Walnut Avenue on the west side of the tracks.

== History ==
The Glen Head station opened on January 23, 1865, initially serving as the northern terminus of the Glen Cove Branch Rail Road. Glen Head served as the terminus of the line until 1867, when it was extended further north. Its initial status as the branch's terminus – the "head of the rails" – gave the hamlet of Glen Head its current name. In July 1866, the Post Office changed the old name of the community from Cedar Swamp to Greenvale, but in February 1874 made another change, renaming the hamlet as Glenwood. The Long Island Rail Road has always used the name Glen Head, and the name prevailed.

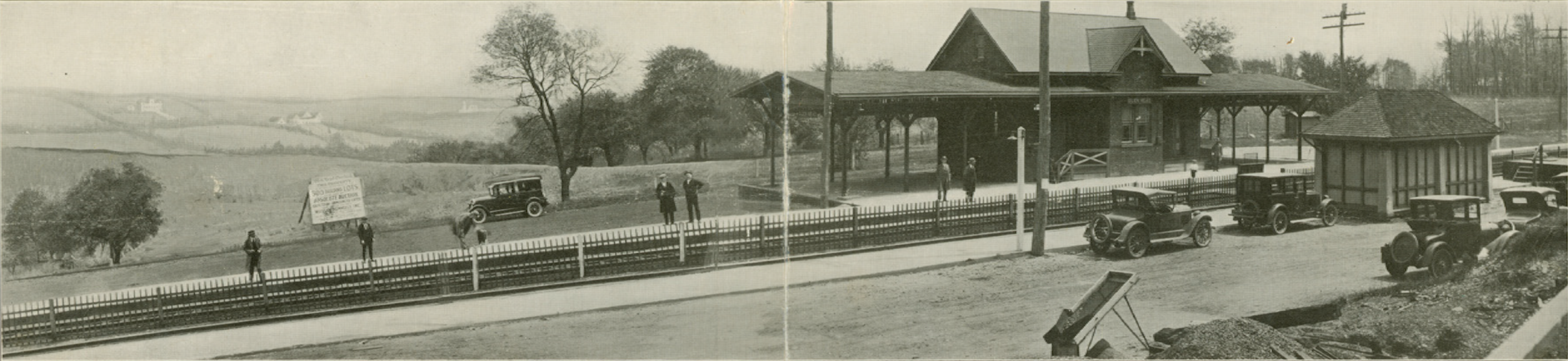
The station around 1930, with soon-to-be developed land to the east behind it

A new station building was opened at Glen Head in May 1888. It was a two-story red brick structure and contained elaborate gingerbread woodwork along the canopies, and was similar in design to the station building at Glen Cove. It was rebuilt again midway through 1961, at which time the 1888-built station building was demolished and replaced with the current one-story cedar-shingled depot.

== Station layout ==
The station has two high-level side platforms, each four cars long.

=== Parking ===
There are three parking fields at the Glen Head station: two on the east side and one on the west side. Both lots on the east side of the station require Town of Oyster Bay parking permits, while the lot on the west side of the station is free and unrestricted.

All of the Glen Head station's parking lots are operated and maintained by the Town of Oyster Bay.

== See also ==
- History of the Long Island Rail Road
- List of Long Island Rail Road stations
