= Oyster Bay Branch =

Long Island Rail Road branch

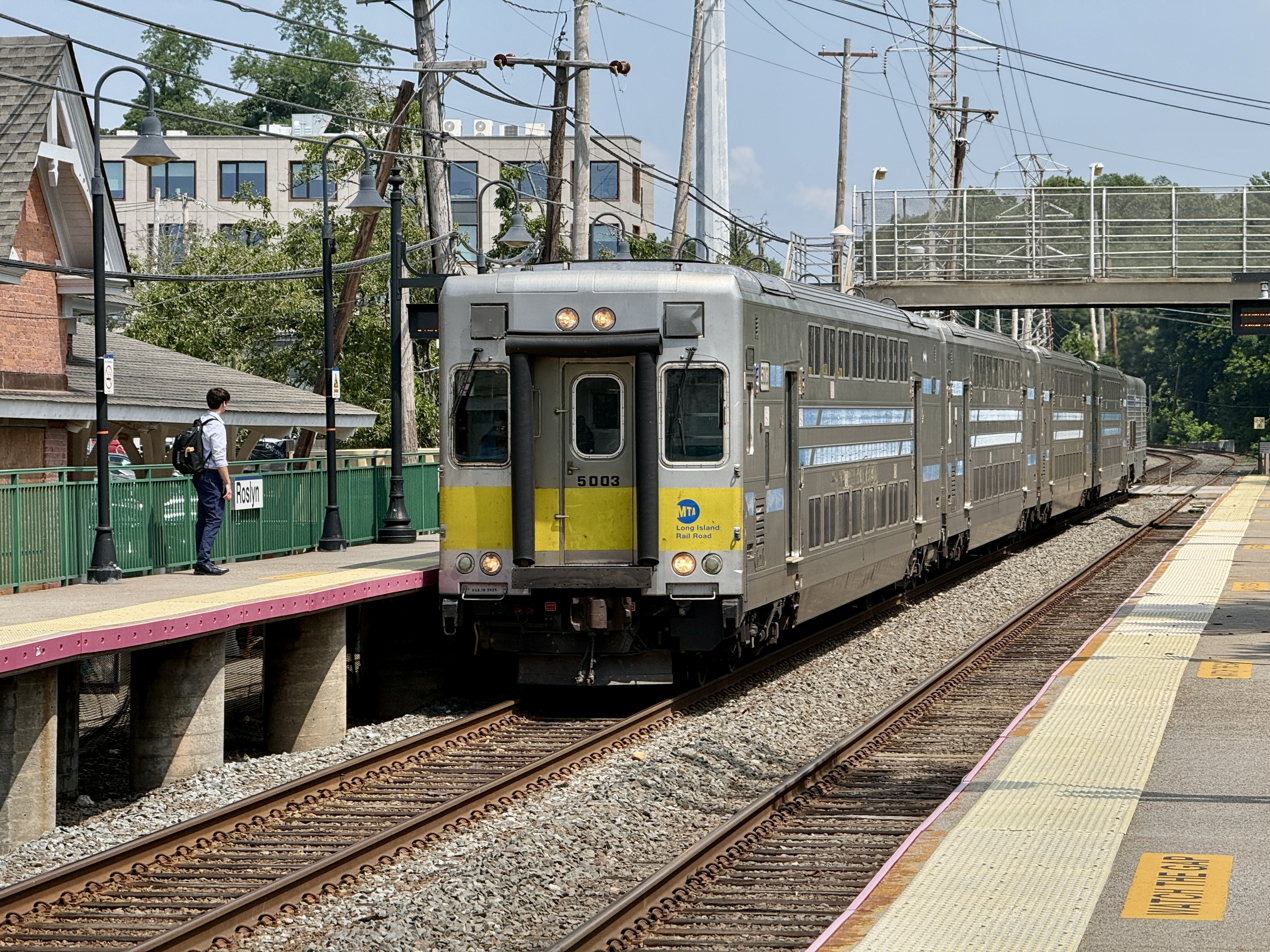
- Train #521 to Jamaica at Roslyn on July 9, 2026

Overview
- Status: Operational
- Owner: Long Island Rail Road
- Locale: Nassau County, New York, USA
- Termini: Mineola; Oyster Bay
- Stations: 10

Service
- Type: Commuter rail
- System: Long Island Rail Road
- Services: Oyster Bay Branch
- Operator: Metropolitan Transportation Authority
- Daily ridership: 6,000 (2003)
- Ridership: 1,257,644 (annual ridership, 2025)

History
- Opened: 1865–1889

Technical
- Track length: 14.68 miles (23.6 km)
- Track gauge: 4 ft 8 1/2 in (1,435 mm)
- Electrification: Third rail, 750 V DC (south of East Williston)
Route map
- Distances shown from Long Island City

The Oyster Bay Branch is a rail line and service owned and operated by the Long Island Rail Road in the U.S. state of New York. The branch splits from the Main Line just east of Mineola station, and runs north and east to Oyster Bay. The branch is electrified between East Williston and Mineola. The branch opened in segments between 1865 and 1889.

== History ==
=== Construction of initial line ===
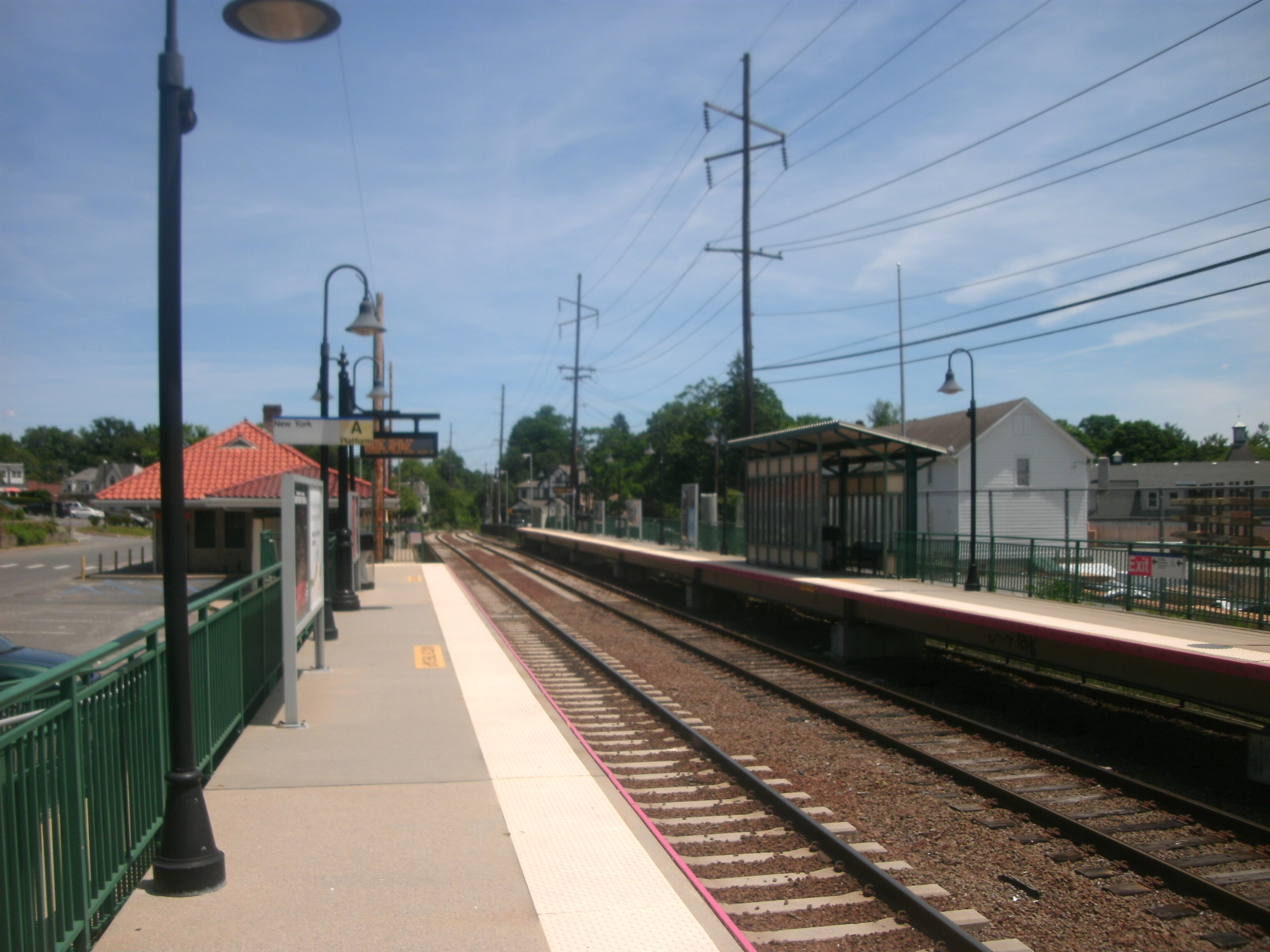
Locust Valley in June 2012

The first phase of what is now known as the Oyster Bay Branch opened on January 23, 1865. The line was built by the Glen Cove Branch Rail Road, a subsidiary of the Long Island Rail Road (LIRR), which was incorporated on December 3, 1858 as a branch of the LIRR's Main Line from Mineola, running north to Glen Head – the line's first terminus.

On May 16, 1867, the line was extended from Glen Head to Glen Cove (now known as Glen Street). Subsequently, on April 19, 1869, the branch was extended further north and east, to Locust Valley.

=== Extension to Oyster Bay ===
By the early 1880s, there had been pressure to expand rail service further eastward. At this time, another railroad – the Northern Railroad of Long Island – threatened the Long Island Rail Road's monopoly. The Northern Railroad was incorporated on March 23, 1881, and it planned to build a road from Astoria to Northport via Flushing, Great Neck, Glen Cove, Oyster Bay, and Huntington. By June 1881, construction plans were authorized – and in mid-July, the building contract was signed, with work set to begin in August. The Long Island Rail Road attempted to undermine the Northern Railroad's project before it could sell stock and acquire a roadbed. It was going to link its north side branches together as a continuous railroad to Northport. Construction cost from Great Neck to Roslyn and from Locust Valley to Northport was approximately $400,000.

In February 1883, Austin Corbin – then the President of the Long Island Rail Road – offered to supply iron and rolling stock for the extension to Oyster Bay, if local residents provided the right-of-way. While citizens considered the offer, the Northern Railroad folded since not enough money had been raised. With the threat eliminated, the extension of rail service to Oyster Bay was temporarily delayed. The project was revived in 1886 when some citizens offered to secure a right-of-way. In June 1886, a public meeting was held and a committee of 15 was appointed to secure land. Although officials were still contemplating a through line to Northport, the LIRR organized the Oyster Bay Extension Railroad on August 31, 1886, which authorized a five-mile (8.0 km) railroad line from Locust Valley to a new terminal in Oyster Bay. Ground was broken for the project on August 15, 1887. One phase of construction was the building of a bridge over what is now Tunnel Street in Locust Valley. The masonry project began in October 1888 and the arch was finished on April 13, 1889. The entire bridge was completed by September.

On June 24, 1889, the extension opened with a huge celebration in Oyster Bay. A ceremonial train of ten cars left Long Island City about 9:30 a.m. and was met at Locust Valley by ten young ladies who decorated the locomotive with flags and wreaths. Upon arrival at Oyster Bay, an organized procession commenced, which was viewed by 5,000 residents and visitors. On Tuesday, June 25, the extension opened for regular passenger service, with eight round trips daily to and from Long Island City.

The line ended at Locust Valley for two decades until a final extension added four miles (6.4 kilometers) to Oyster Bay. One of the reasons for building to Oyster Bay was to create a connection to New England. A large pier, now owned by the Flowers Oyster Company, was built to facilitate the loading of passenger cars onto a ferry, specifically to the Danbury and Norwalk Railroad station and ferry pier in Wilson's Point section of Norwalk, Connecticut. Service lasted only a few years as overland service from New York to Boston, once thought impossible, commenced.

=== Operation ===
In early 1892, a second track was built between Mineola and Albertson. The Oyster Bay Branch was double-tracked to Roslyn, Glen Cove, and Locust Valley in 1905, 1909, and 1911, respectively. The extension of the line's second track was done in anticipation of electrification.

Until 1928, a direct connection to the West Hempstead Branch existed just east of Mineola station. This spur crossed the Main Line, then connected to the end of a wye at what was often called the Garden City Branch. Until passenger service was abandoned along this branch, passengers would transfer between the two lines at Mineola Station itself.

In November 1928, LIRR officials surveyed the branch to evaluate the feasibility of electrifying the line. The Glen Cove Chamber of Commerce petitioned the LIRR, advocating for electrification. In response, the Vice President of the LIRR, in December, stated that the LIRR had to deal with the completion of multiple grade crossing elimination projects before electrifying the Oyster Bay Branch, which was estimated to cost $3.28 million.

By June 1934, the section of the line between East Williston and Mineola was electrified, with the remainder of the branch expected to be electrified soon after. However, the remainder of the work was not completed – and, as a result, the branch is served by diesel powered-locomotive trains (although until 2021, one AM peak train that originated at East Williston and ended at Penn Station utilized electric multiple units). Mill Neck station closed in 1998.

In 2009, the LIRR replaced the bridge over West Shore Road between Locust Valley and Oyster Bay Stations. In the late 2010s, the LIRR replaced and raised the bridge over Buckram Road between Locust Valley and Oyster Bay Stations.

In April 2021, then-President Phillip Eng announced that the LIRR entered into an agreement with Alstom to test battery-powered train cars along the Oyster Bay Branch. The branch was chosen due to the short 13-mile trip between East Williston and Oyster Bay. The project had the potential to improve service along the branch and across the LIRR's remaining diesel territory. However, after spending $850,000 on the project, in July 2022 the LIRR announced that retrofitting existing trains with the technology was proven to be unfeasible, but the technology could be added to future train cars. Environmental groups continue to pressure the state to include LIRR electrification in their plan to become carbon neutral by 2050.

== Stations ==
West of Mineola, most trains originate or terminate at Jamaica, with some rush hour trips ending at Hunterspoint Avenue, Long Island City, or Penn Station. Once on the branch, all trains run local except for one westbound rush-hour skip-stop service. Additionally, some rush hour trains express through Mineola in order to prevent congestion on track 3 of the Main Line.

Zone	Location	Station	Miles (km) from Long Island City	Date opened	Date closed	Connections and notes
4	Mineola	Mineola	18.6 (29.9)	1837		Long Island Rail Road: ■ Montauk Branch, ■ Port Jefferson Branch, ■ Ronkonkoma Branch; Nassau Inter-County Express: n22, n22X, n23, n24, n40, n40X, n41, n15 Originally named Hempstead, then Branch or Hempstead Branch
4	East Williston	East Williston	19.8 (31.9)	1880		Nassau Inter-County Express: n27 Terminus of electrification
7	Albertson	Albertson	20.8 (33.5)	1875		Nassau Inter-County Express: n27
7	Roslyn Heights	Roslyn	22.2 (35.7)	January 23, 1865		Nassau Inter-County Express: n23, n27
7	Roslyn Harbor	North Roslyn	23.4 (37.7)	1898	1924	Originally named Wheatley Hills
7	Roslyn Harbor	Greenvale	24.2 (38.9)	1866		Nassau Inter-County Express: n27 Originally named Week's
7	Glen Head	Glen Head	25.4 (40.9)	January 23, 1865		Nassau Inter-County Express: n27
7	Glen Cove	Sea Cliff	26.7 (43.0)	May 16, 1867		Nassau Inter-County Express: n27
7	Glen Cove	Glen Street	27.3 (43.9)	May 16, 1867		Nassau Inter-County Express: n21, n27
7	Glen Cove	Glen Cove	27.9 (44.9)	1895		Originally named Nassau
7	Locust Valley	Locust Valley	29.0 (46.7)	April 19, 1869		
7	Mill Neck	Mill Neck	31.0 (49.9)	June 24, 1889	1998	Originally named Bayville
7	Oyster Bay	Oyster Bay	32.9 (52.9)	June 24, 1889		

== See also ==
- History of the Long Island Rail Road
- Port Washington Branch
- Port Jefferson Branch
