= Glen Head, New York =

- Hamlet and census-designated place
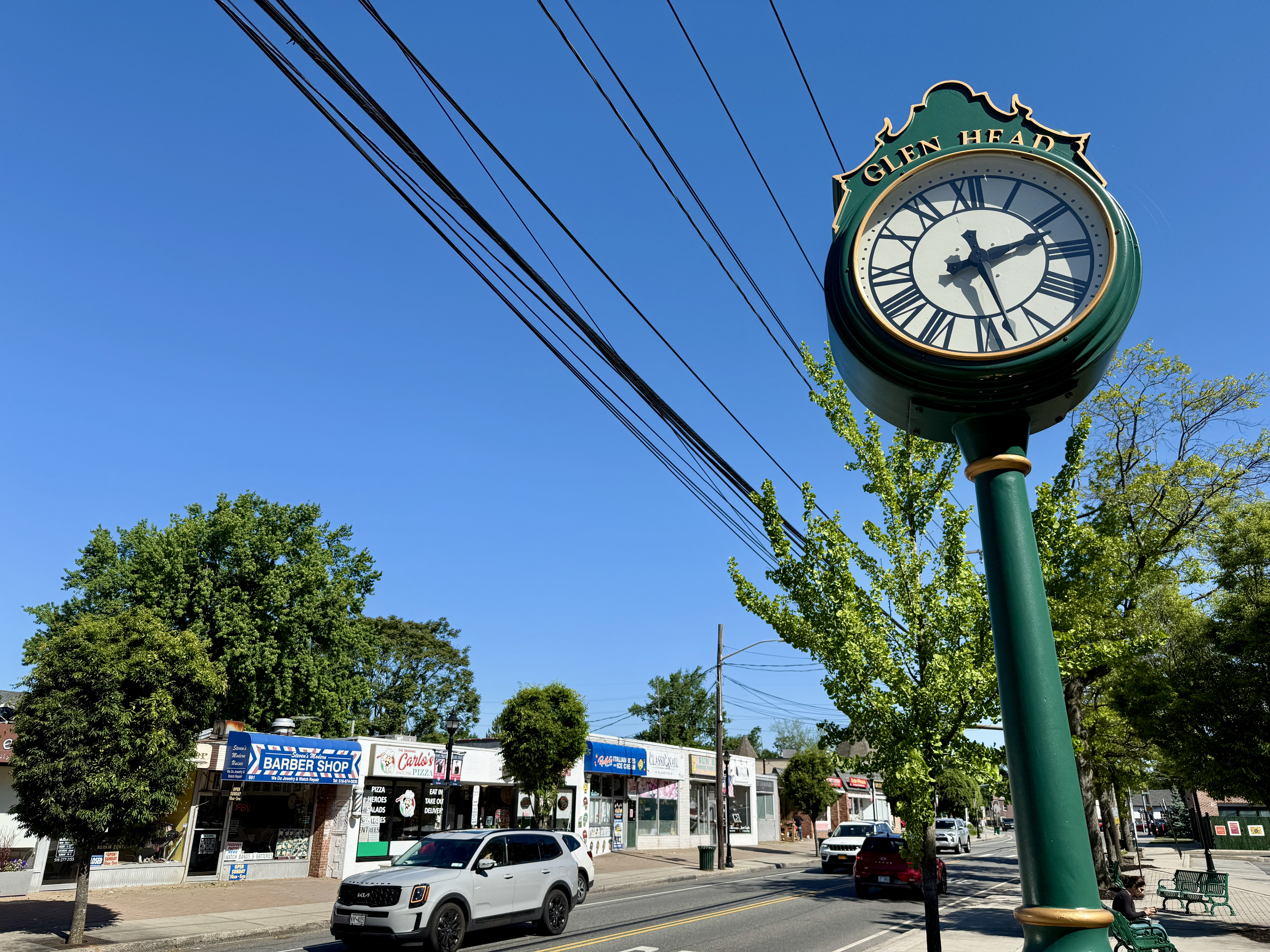
- Downtown Glen Head in 2025

- Location in Nassau County and the state of New York

- Location on Long Island Location within the state of New York
- Coordinates: 40°50′26″N 73°37′8″W
- Country: United States
- State: New York
- County: Nassau
- Town: Oyster Bay

Area
  - Total: 1.64 sq mi (4.25 km^{2})
  - Land: 1.64 sq mi (4.25 km^{2})
  - Water: 0 sq mi (0.00 km^{2})
- Elevation: 115 ft (35 m)

Population (2026)
  - Total: 4,547
  - Density: 2,944.5/sq mi (1,136.89/km^{2})
- Time zone: UTC-5 (Eastern (EST))
  - Summer (DST): UTC-4 (EDT)
- ZIP Codes: 11545 (Glen Head); 11542 (Glen Cove)
- Area codes: 516, 363
- FIPS code: 36-29245
- GNIS feature ID: 0951181

Glen Head is a hamlet and census-designated place (CDP) located within the Town of Oyster Bay in Nassau County, on the North Shore of Long Island, in New York, United States. It is considered part of the greater Glen Cove area, which is anchored by the City of Glen Cove. The population was 4,837 at the time of the 2020 census.

== Geography ==
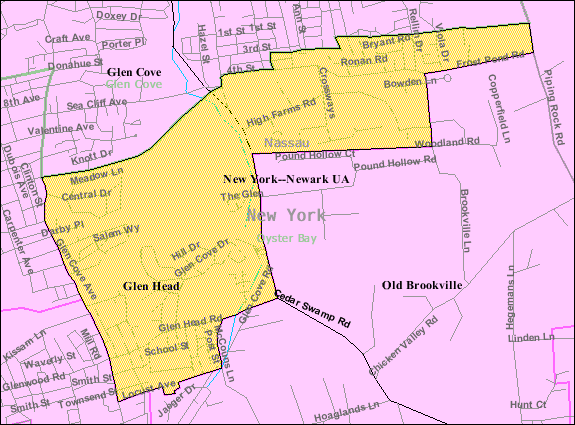
U.S. Census map of Glen Head.

According to the United States Census Bureau, the CDP has a total area of 1.6 square miles (4.1 km^{2}), all land.

Glen Head is bordered to the north by the City of Glen Cove, to the east & northeast by the Village of Matinecock, to the east & south by the Village of Old Brookville, to the west & northwest by the Village of Sea Cliff, and to the west & southwest by Glenwood Landing.

== Economy ==
Glen Head is a bedroom community of the City of New York, being located less than 30 miles to the east of Manhattan. Accordingly, a significant number of the hamlet's residents commute to/from New York for work.

The Strat-O-Matic game company is headquartered in Glen Head.

== Demographics ==
Historical population
Census	Pop.	Note	%±
2000	4,625		—
2010	4,697		1.6%
2020	4,837		3.0%
U.S. Decennial Census

=== 2020 census ===
As of the 2020 census, Glen Head had a population of 4,837. The median age was 45.8 years. 22.0% of residents were under the age of 18 and 20.5% of residents were 65 years of age or older. For every 100 females there were 95.8 males, and for every 100 females age 18 and over there were 92.6 males age 18 and over.

100.0% of residents lived in urban areas, while 0.0% lived in rural areas.

There were 1,718 households in Glen Head, of which 32.6% had children under the age of 18 living in them. Of all households, 63.0% were married-couple households, 11.3% were households with a male householder and no spouse or partner present, and 21.7% were households with a female householder and no spouse or partner present. About 19.2% of all households were made up of individuals and 11.2% had someone living alone who was 65 years of age or older.

There were 1,787 housing units, of which 3.9% were vacant. The homeowner vacancy rate was 1.9% and the rental vacancy rate was 6.3%.

Racial composition as of the 2020 census
Race	Number	Percent
White	3,902	80.7%
Black or African American	34	0.7%
American Indian and Alaska Native	9	0.2%
Asian	331	6.8%
Native Hawaiian and Other Pacific Islander	0	0.0%
Some other race	214	4.4%
Two or more races	347	7.2%
Hispanic or Latino (of any race)	546	11.3%

=== 2010 census ===
As of the 2010 census the population of the Census designated place was 4,697. The population was 91.8% White 86.2% Non-Hispanic white, 0.9% Black or African American, 0.1% Native American, 3.4% Asian, 0.0% Pacific Islander, 2.3% from other races, and 1.5% from two or more races. Hispanic or Latino of any race were 8.1% of the population.

=== 2000 census ===
As of the census of 2000, there were 4,625 people, 1,681 households, and 1,314 families residing in the CDP. The population density was 2,870.7 inhabitants per square mile (1,108.4/km^{2}). There were 1,717 housing units at an average density of 1,065.7 per square mile (411.5/km^{2}). The racial makeup of the CDP was 95.29% White, 0.50% African American, 0.04% Native American, 2.01% Asian, 0.06% Pacific Islander, 1.15% from other races, and 0.95% from two or more races. Hispanic or Latino of any race were 4.61% of the population.

There were 1,681 households, out of which 34.0% had children under the age of 18 living with them, 65.0% were married couples living together, 9.8% had a female householder with no husband present, and 21.8% were non-families. 18.0% of all households were made up of individuals, and 9.0% had someone living alone who was 65 years of age or older. The average household size was 2.75 and the average family size was 3.12.

In the CDP, the population was spread out, with 23.9% under the age of 18, 5.3% from 18 to 24, 26.9% from 25 to 44, 27.1% from 45 to 64, and 16.9% who were 65 years of age or older. The median age was 42 years. For every 100 females, there were 81.1 males. For every 100 females age 18 and over, there were 79.3 males.

The median income for a household in the CDP was $94,453, and the median income for a family was $103,048. Males had a median income of $86,469 versus $50,909 for females. The per capita income for the CDP was $67,425. About 1.4% of families and 2.4% of the population were below the poverty line, including 2.2% of those under age 18 and 1.4% of those age 65 or over.

== Government ==
=== Local government ===
As an unincorporated area within the Town of Oyster Bay, Glen Head is directly governed by the Oyster Bay Town Council, seated in Oyster Bay.

=== Representation in higher government ===
==== Nassau County representation ====
Glen Head is primarily located within Nassau County's 11th Legislative district, which as of April 2025 is represented in the Nassau County Legislature by Delia DiRiggi-Whitton (D–Glen Cove) – spare for a small portion of the CDP south of Glenwood Road & east of Glen Cove Avenue, which is located within the 18th Legislative district and, in turn, represented as of April 2025 by Samantha A. Goetz (R–Locust Valley).

==== New York State representation ====
===== New York State Assembly =====
Glen Head is located within New York's 15th State Assembly district, which as of May 2025 is represented in the New York State Assembly by Jacob Ryan Blumencranz (R–Oyster Bay).

===== New York State Senate =====
Glen Head is located within the New York State Senate's 7th State Senate district, which as of May 2025 is represented in the New York State Senate by Jack M. Martins (R–Old Westbury).

==== Federal representation ====
===== United States Congress =====
Glen Head is located within New York's 3rd congressional district, which as of April 2025 is represented in the United States Congress by Thomas R. Suozzi (D–Glen Cove).

==== United States Senate ====
Like the rest of New York, Glen Head is represented in the United States Senate by Charles Schumer (D) and Kirsten Gillibrand (D).

=== Politics ===
In the 2024 U.S. presidential election, the majority of Glen Head voters voted for Donald Trump (R).

== Education ==
=== School district ===
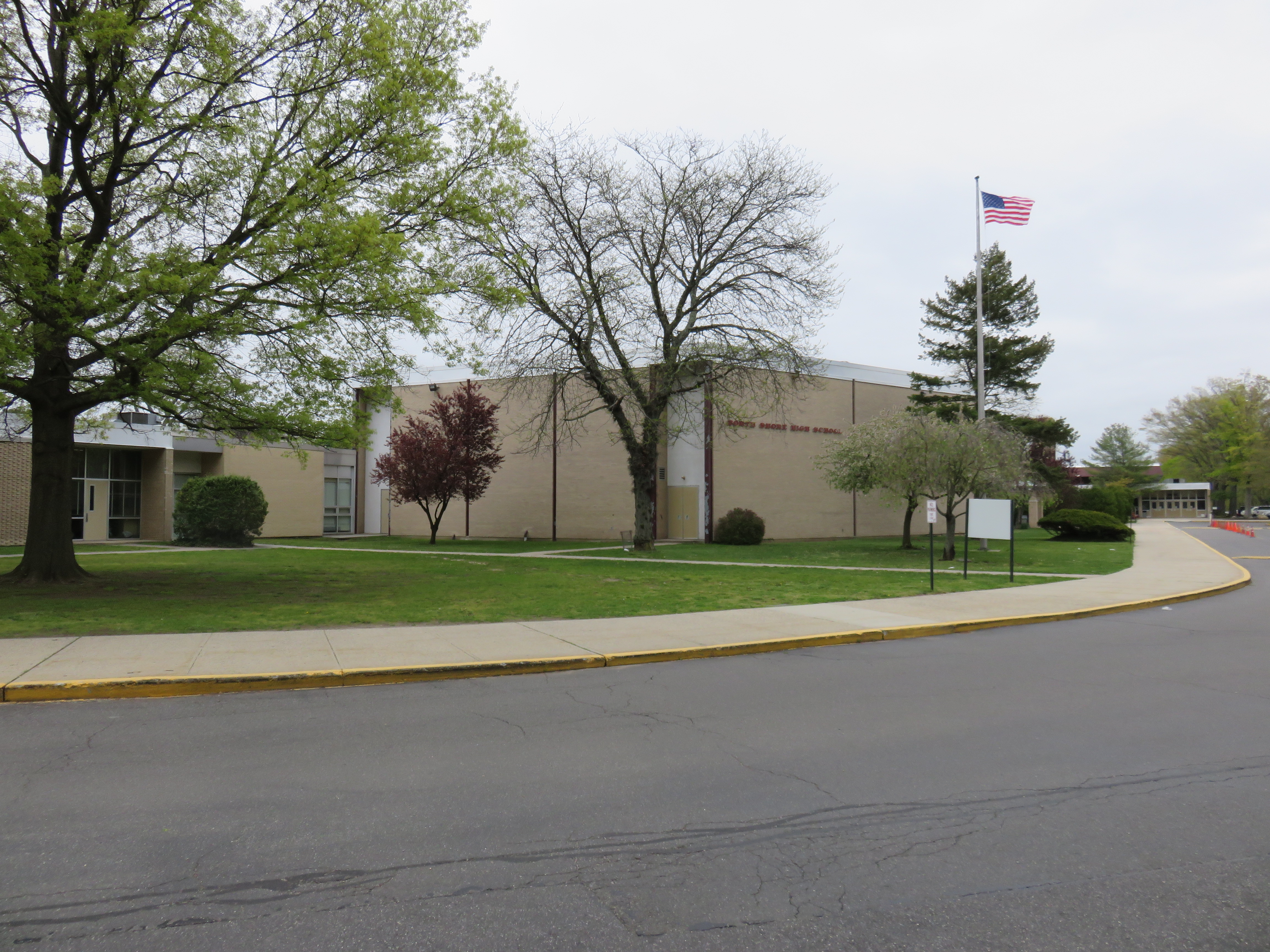
North Shore High School in 2016

Glen Head is served by the North Shore Central School District.

Additionally, North Shore High School – the sole high school in the North Shore Central School District – is located within Glen Head.

=== Library district ===
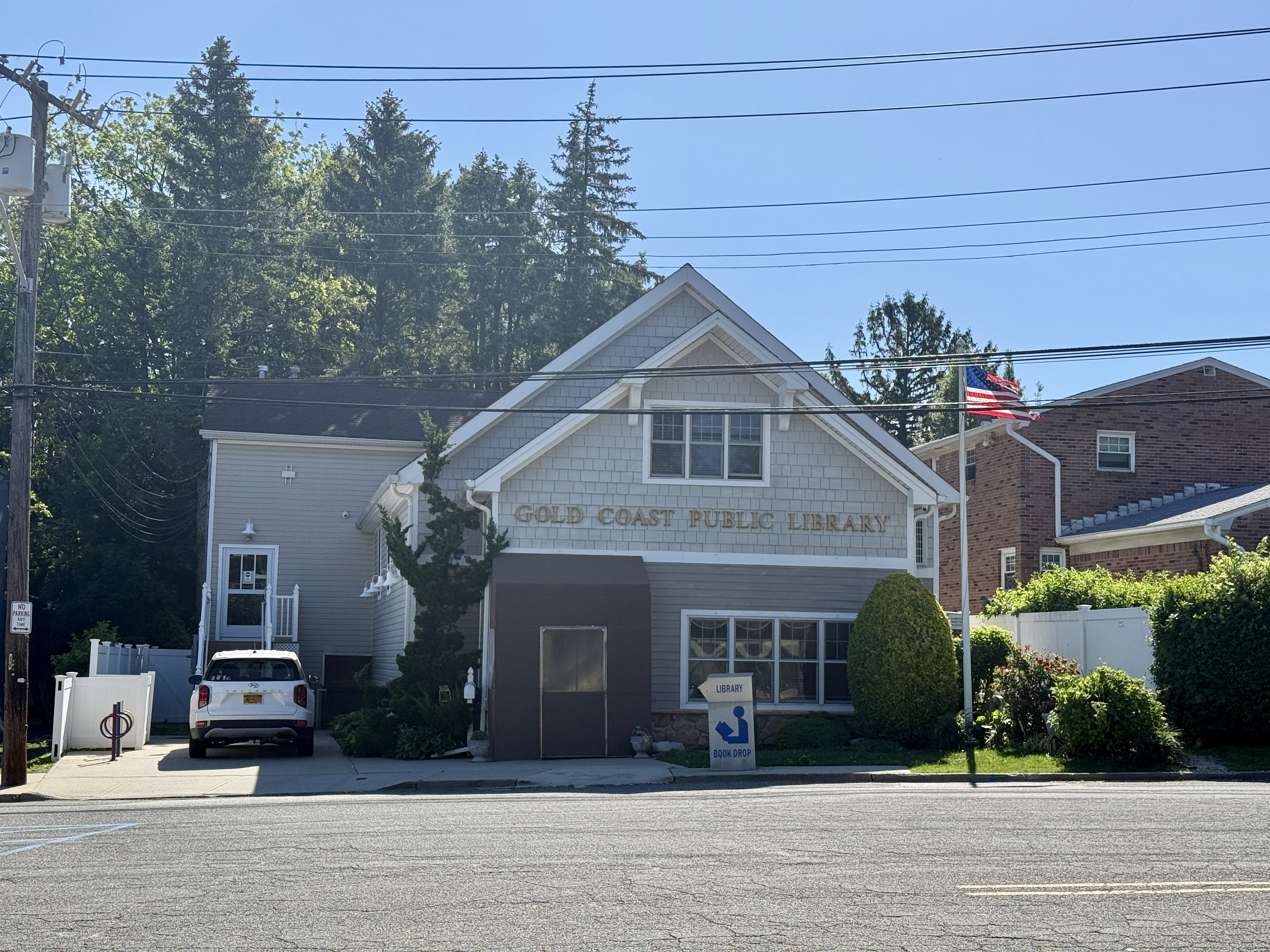
Gold Coast Public Library, located within Glen Head, in 2025

Glen Head, in its entirety, is located within the boundaries of the Gold Coast Library District, which is served by the Gold Coast Public Library, located within Glen Head's downtown.

== Infrastructure ==
=== Transportation ===
==== Road ====
Major roads within Glen Head include Glen Cove Road, Cedar Swamp Road (NY 107), Glen Head Road, and Glen Cove Avenue.

==== Rail ====
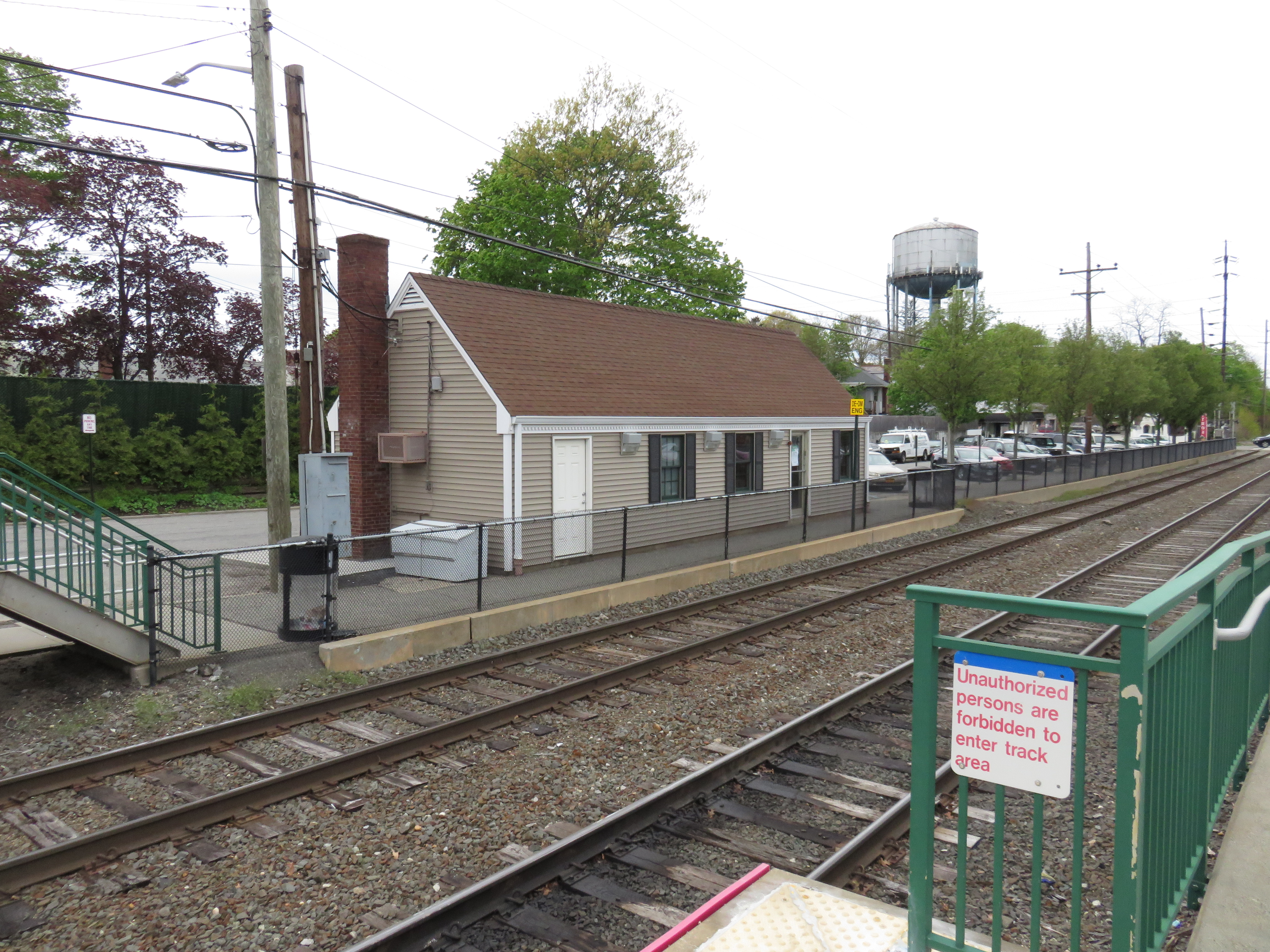
The Glen Head LIRR station in 2016

The Glen Head station on the Long Island Rail Road's Oyster Bay Branch is located within Glen Head's downtown.

==== Bus ====
Glen Head is served by the n21 and n27 bus routes, which are operated by Nassau Inter-County Express (NICE).

=== Utilities ===
==== Natural gas ====
National Grid USA provides natural gas to homes and businesses that are hooked up to natural gas lines in Glen Head.

==== Power ====
PSEG Long Island provides power to all homes and businesses within Glen Head.

==== Sewage ====
Glen Head is not connected to any sanitary sewers, and as such, the entire hamlet relies on cesspools and septic systems.

==== Water ====
The water supply system in Glen Head is primarily operated by Liberty Utilities – although the northeastern extremes of the CDP is located within the boundaries of (and is thus served by) the Jericho Water District.
