= Glen Cove Avenue =

County highway in Nassau County, New York

County Route C91
- Glen Cove Avenue
- Glen Cove Avenue, highlighted in red

Route information
- Maintained by NCDPW
- Length: 3.45 mi (5.55 km)

Major junctions
- South end: Bryant Avenue (CR C26) and Plaza Road in Roslyn Harbor
- North end: Brewster Street (CR C19), Herb Hill Road, and Mill Hill Road in Glen Cove

Location
- Country: United States
- State: New York
- County: Nassau

Highway system
- County routes in New York; County Routes in Nassau County

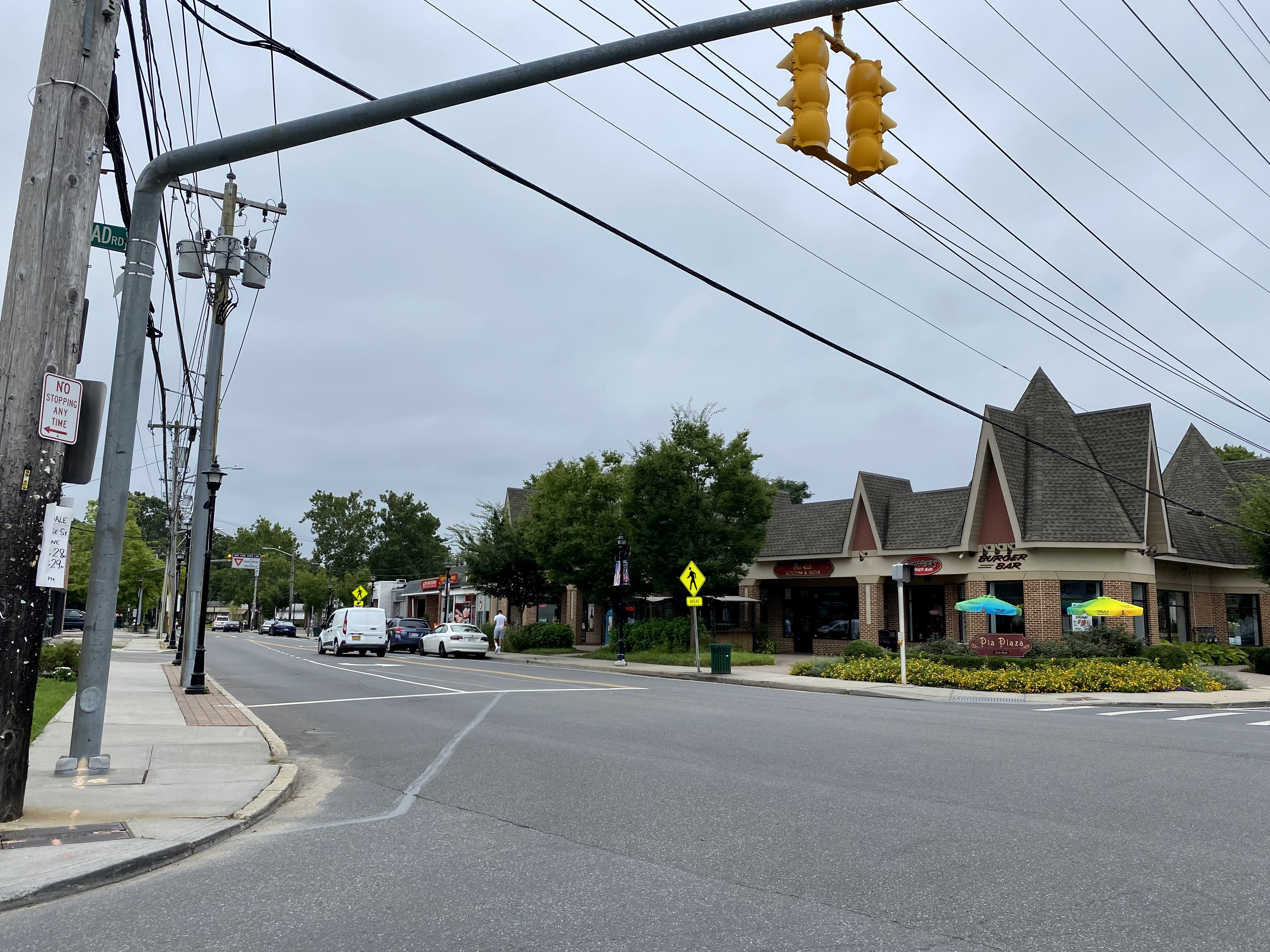
Glen Cove Avenue (CR C91) in Glen Head, as seen in 2021.

Glen Cove Avenue is a major, 3.45-mile (5.55 km) road connecting Roslyn Harbor and Glen Cove in Nassau County, on Long Island, New York, in the United States.

The road, for its entire length is designated as unsigned County Route C91.

== Route description ==
CR C91 begins in Roslyn Harbor at its intersection with Bryant Avenue (CR C26) and Plaza Road, adjacent to the Greenvale Long Island Rail Road station. It then continues north through Roslyn Harbor, passing Back Road and eventually entering Glenwood Landing, still continuing north and eventually reaching University Place. From there, CR C91 turns towards the northwest, intersecting with Scudders Lane (CR E19) before reaching its intersection with Glen Head Road/Glenwood Road (CR C94) in Glen Head. From there, CR C91continues north-northwest, intersecting with Kissam Lane (CR D27) and passing North Shore Middle School & North Shore High School, before eventually reaching Glen Avenue (CR C89).

From Glen Avenue, CR C91 continues north, reaching its intersection with Sea Cliff Avenue (CR E20) one block to the north. CR C91 then continues heading towards the north, intersecting with Craft Avenue, Shore Road (CR E25), and then Morris Avenue in Glen Cove before reaching Pratt Boulevard. From there, CR C91 continues towards the north, reaching an intersection one block later, where the road meets Brewster Street (CR C19), Herb Hill Road, and Mill Hill Road and the CR C91 designation terminates; Glen Cove Avenue becomes Brewster Street at this location.

== History ==
In the 1950s and 1960s, a proposal was made to widen Glen Cove Avenue. Action on the proposal, first made in the 1950s, was delayed until 1964. Many objected to the widening, concerned that such a project would have ruin the area's character. Among the project's opponents were several members of the Oyster Bay Town Council, who claimed that the widening would lead to downzoning and urbanization, echoing the concerns expressed by many of the residents in the vicinity of the road.

CR C91 was formerly designated as part of CR 142 and CR 183, prior to the route numbers in Nassau County being altered. It, along with all of the other county routes in Nassau County, became unsigned in the 1970s, when Nassau County officials opted to remove the signs as opposed to allocating the funds for replacing them with new ones that met the latest federal design standards and requirements, as per the federal government's Manual on Uniform Traffic Control Devices.

== Major intersections ==
Location	mi	km	Destinations	Notes
Roslyn Harbor	0.00	0.00	Bryant Avenue (CR C26) and Plaza Road	Southern terminus; access to the Greenvale LIRR station.
Glenwood Landing	0.52	0.84	University Place	
Glen Head	1.18	1.90	CR C94 (Glen Head Road / Glenwood Road)	
Glen Cove–Sea Cliff line	2.46	3.96	Sea Cliff Avenue (CR E20)	
Glen Cove	2.83	4.55	Craft Avenue	
Glen Cove	3.42	5.50	Brewster Street (CR C19), Mill Hill Road, and Herb Hill Road	Northern terminus; Glen Cove Avenue continues north as Brewster Street (CR C19).
1.000 mi = 1.609 km; 1.000 km = 0.621 mi

== See also ==
- List of county routes in Nassau County, New York
- Glen Cove Road
- New York State Route 107
