= Mineola station (LIRR) =

Transportation hub in Nassau County, New York

Mineola
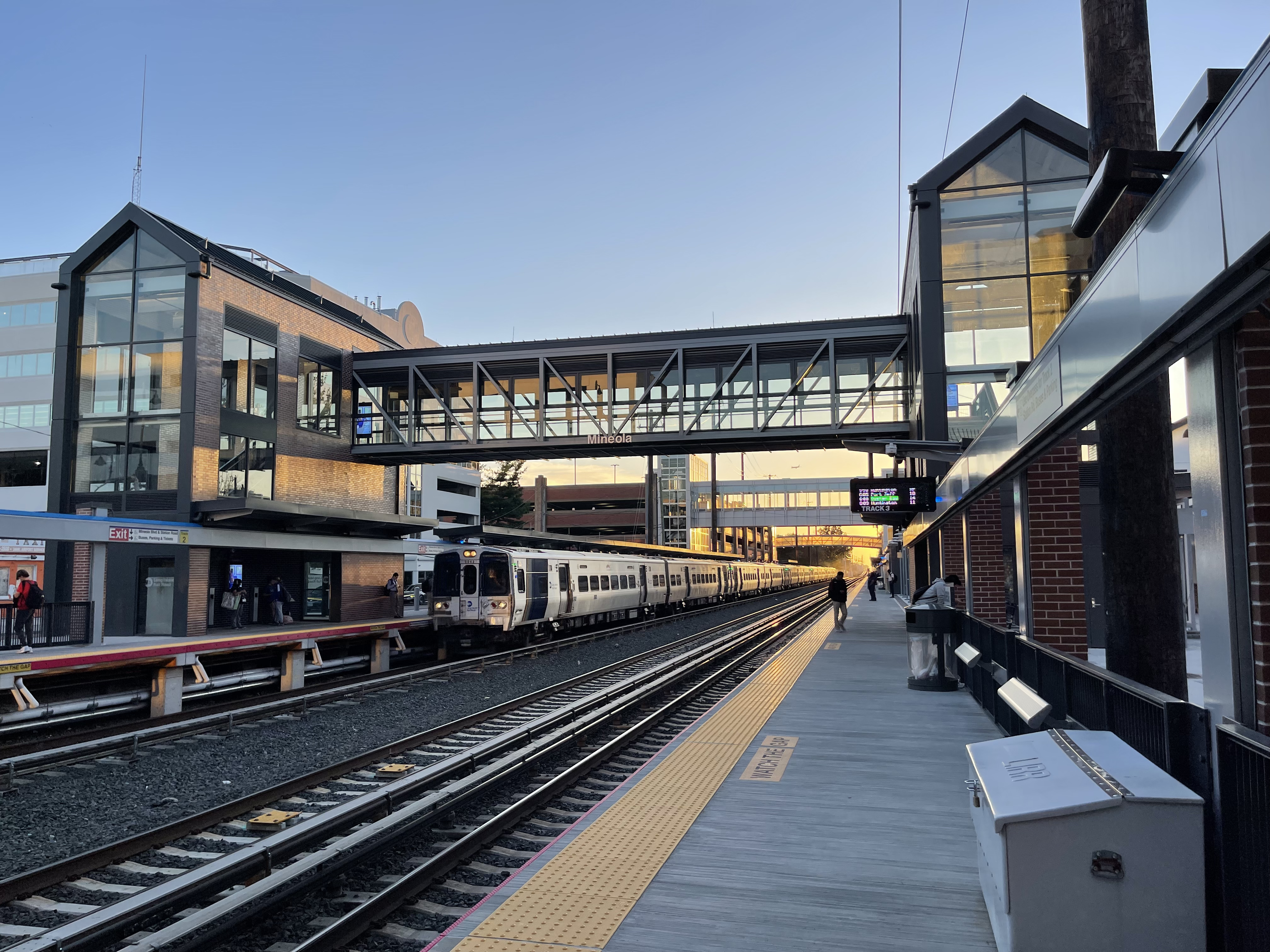
- Mineola station in October 2023

General information
- Location: Front Street and Mineola Boulevard; Mineola, New York
- Coordinates: 40.740291°N 73.641025°W
- Owner: Long Island Rail Road
- Lines: Main Line; Oyster Bay Branch
- Distance: 18.5 mi (29.8 km) from Long Island City
- Platforms: 2 side platforms
- Tracks: 3
- Connections: Nassau Inter-County Express (see below)

Construction
- Parking: Yes
- Cycle facilities: Yes
- Accessible: yes

Other information
- Station code: MIN
- Fare zone: 4

History
- Opened: 1837; 189 years ago
- Rebuilt: 1872; 154 years ago, 1883; 143 years ago, 1923; 103 years ago, 2001; 25 years ago, 2006; 20 years ago, 2021; 5 years ago
- Electrified: October 1926; 100 years ago 750 V (DC) third rail
- Former names: Branch, Hempstead Branch

Passengers
- 2012—2014: 13,085 per weekday
- Rank: 8 of 126

Services
Preceding station	Long Island Rail Road	Following station
Merillon Avenue toward Penn Station, Grand Central or Long Island City	Port Jefferson Branch	Carle Place toward Huntington or Port Jefferson
Elmont-UBS Arena limited service toward Penn Station, Grand Central or Long Island City	Port Jefferson Branch	Carle Place toward Huntington or Port Jefferson
Jamaica toward Penn Station, Jamaica or Long Island City	Oyster Bay Branch	East Williston toward Oyster Bay
Jamaica toward Penn Station or Grand Central	Ronkonkoma Branch	Hicksville toward Ronkonkoma
Elmont-UBS Arena limited service toward Penn Station or Grand Central	Ronkonkoma Branch	Hicksville toward Ronkonkoma
Jamaica toward Penn Station or Long Island City	Montauk Branch limited service	Hicksville toward Montauk
Former services
Preceding station	Long Island Rail Road	Following station
Merillon Avenue toward Long Island City or Penn Station	Main Line	Carle Place toward Greenport
Terminus	Oyster Bay Branch	East Williston toward Oyster Bay
Hempstead Crossing toward Valley Stream	West Hempstead Branch	Terminus
Proposed services
Preceding station	Amtrak	Following station
Jamaica toward Norfolk, Newport News or Christiansburg	Northeast Regional	Hicksville toward Ronkonkoma
Location

The Mineola Intermodal Center is an intermodal center and transportation hub in the Village of Mineola, in Nassau County, New York, United States. It contains the Mineola Long Island Rail Road station – one of the railroad's busiest stations – in addition to one of the Nassau Inter-County Express (NICE) bus system's main hubs, located adjacent to the southern train platform.

The Mineola station was the eighth-busiest station on the Long Island Rail Road as of 2014, in terms of weekday boardings, with 13,085 boardings per day; all trains on the Main Line (Port Jefferson and Ronkonkoma Branches) and Oyster Bay Branch run through the station, as well as a few trains on the Montauk Branch.

== Location ==
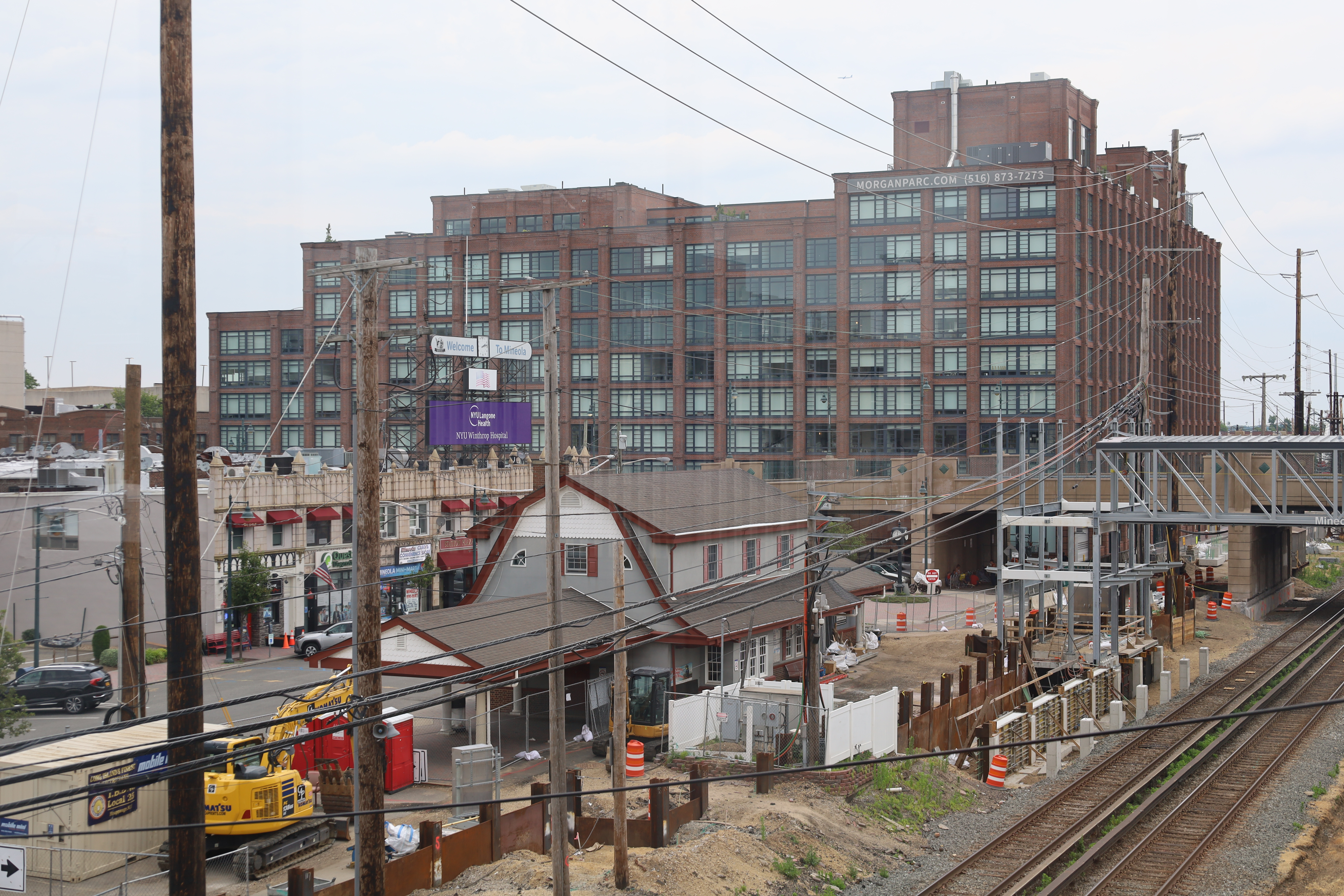
The Mineola station house with the Morgan Parc transit-oriented development behind it in 2021

The Mineola Intermodal Center lies in the center of the Village of Mineola. Specifically, it is situated to the west of Mineola Boulevard, between Station Road to the south and Front Street to the north.

As one of the LIRR's busiest stations and being located near the center of Nassau County, the Village of Mineola Planning Committee created a master plan for the municipality meant to encourage transit-oriented development within a few blocks' radius of the station. Much of the plan involves creating links in the surrounding street grid, streetscape improvements, and pedestrian zones. The Long Island Index, which aggregates data and plans about the island, has listed Mineola as one of the most high-profile targets for smart growth.

== History ==
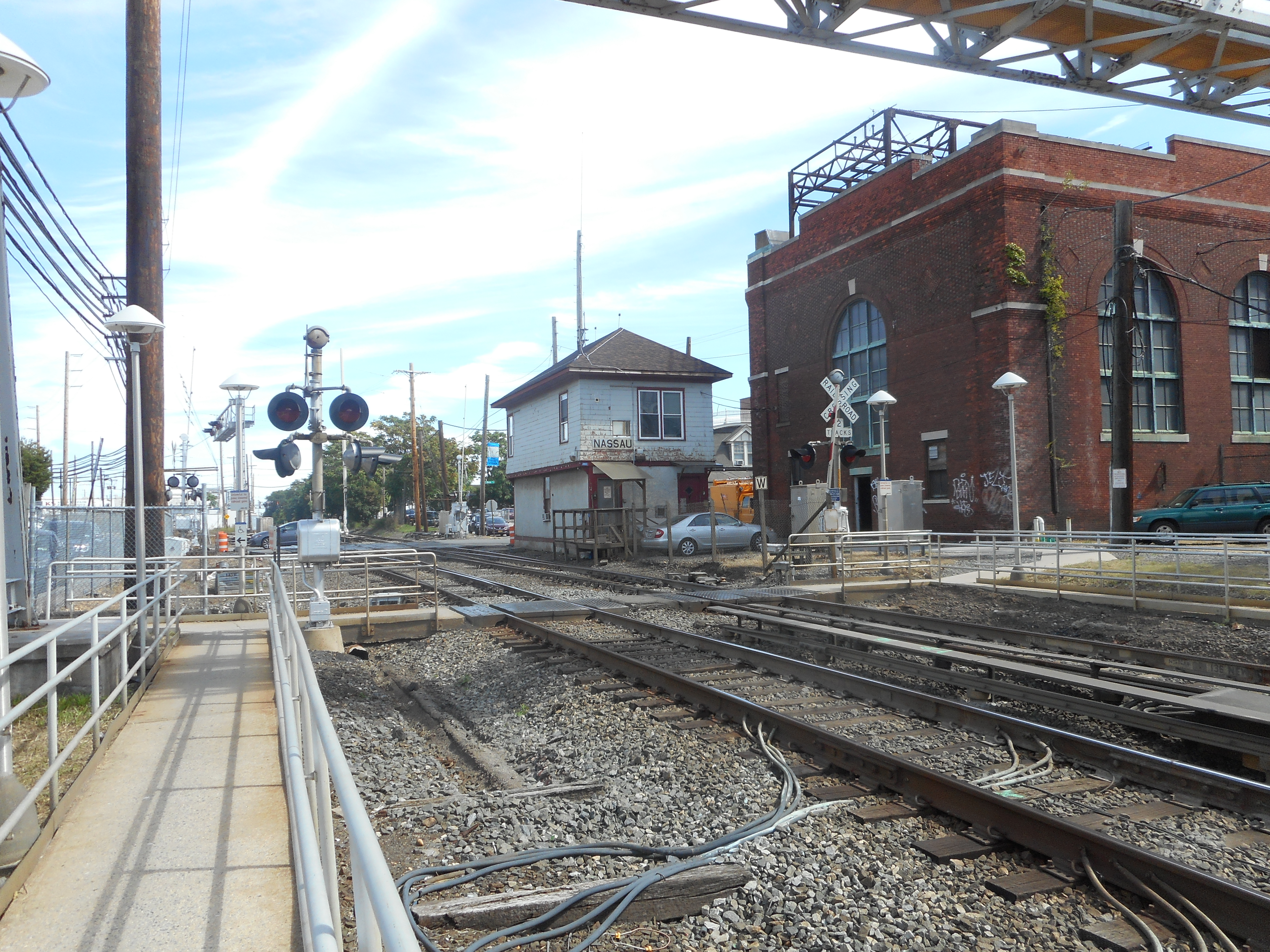
The Nassau Tower and substation in front of the pedestrian crossing

=== Early history ===
Mineola station was originally built on the south side of the tracks in 1837 as "Branch station", then later renamed "Hempstead Branch station" when the Long Island Railroad was expanded to Hicksville. The station was renovated in June 1872, but a second depot was built between May and June 1883. This station was razed in 1923, and the third one was relocated to the north side of the tracks on September 22, 1923. The enclosed shelter was built at the old station house's location. Three years later, in 1926, the tracks through Mineola were electrified, thus enabling the station to be served by electric trains.

With its connection to the Oyster Bay Branch, the Mineola station has always been a major railroad junction, but even more so in the 19th and much of the 20th Century. On the south side of the station, a wye existed between the power sub-station for a line that connected the West Hempstead Branch with the Oyster Bay Branch. Sometimes referred to as the Garden City Branch, the east branch of this wye began at Third Street, then crossed Main Street, and thence the Main Line itself, before connecting with the Oyster Bay Branch – until the connection was eliminated in 1928. The rest of the line was eliminated in 1966.

=== Modern history ===
In 2001, the Mineola station underwent a major reconstruction project. This project brought the station into a state of good repair and modernized existing facilities.

On October 16, 2006, the bus terminal at the Mineola station opened, creating the Mineola Intermodal Center; the facility also includes a parking garage above the bus station. This enabled buses operated by MTA Long Island Bus and LIRR trains to serve a single, consolidated facility; NICE buses would subsequently use the bus facility following the privatization of Long Island Bus. Prior to the bus facility's opening, buses serving the station stopped a block away, on Third Street.

==== 2010s–2020s upgrades ====
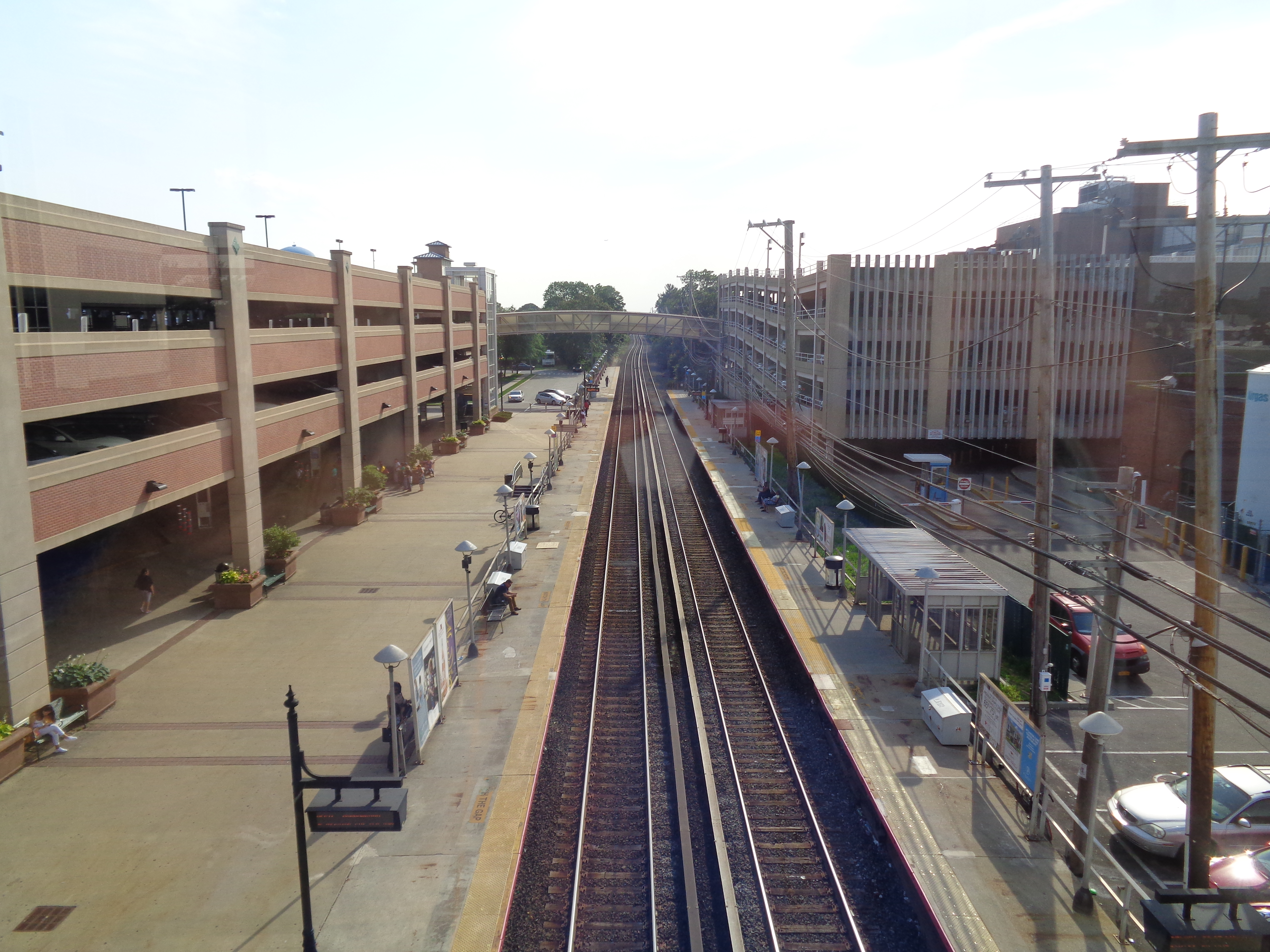
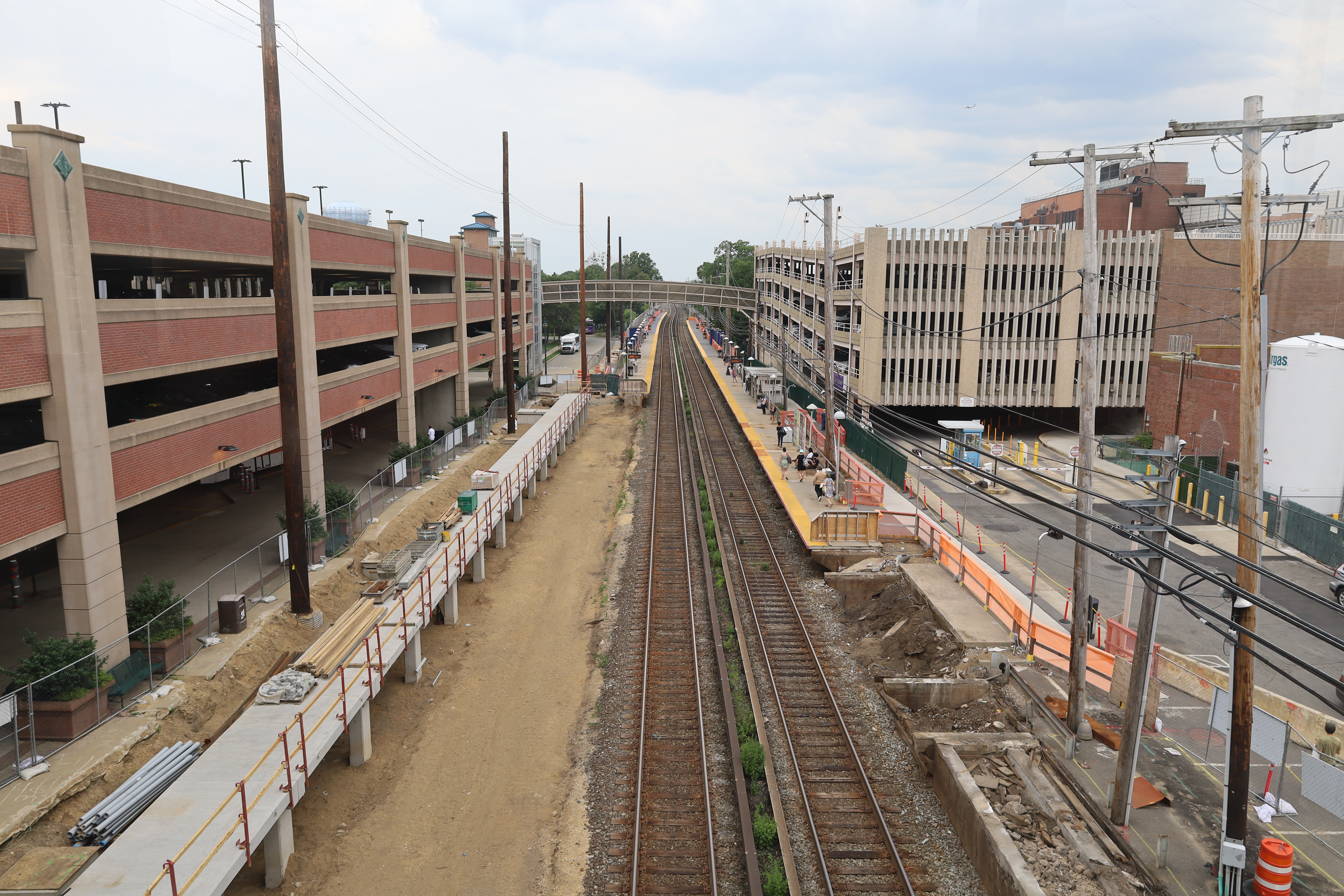
Station platforms in 2017 (top), and 2021 (bottom) with new platforms under construction to accommodate addition of the third track

As part of the LIRR third track project, renovation of infrastructure around the Mineola station began in late 2018. Both platforms would be replaced and Platform B would be relocated. Canopies, benches, signage, and security cameras would be installed. The new platforms would be heated to facilitate snow removal. Amenities such as Wi-Fi, USB charging stations, artwork, and digital information displays were also installed at the station as part of the renovations.

The construction of a new parking structure at Harrison Avenue began in fall 2018, followed by the start of reconstruction on the station itself in early 2019. The Second Street parking lot would also be expanded, and a park and ride parking lot at Main Street would be built. The dangerous grade crossing at Main Street was closed and replaced with a pedestrian overpass with two elevators. Additionally, the grade crossing at Willis Avenue further east of the station was eliminated and replaced with an underpass. The construction of the third track also required the replacement of a substation at the intersection of Main and Front Streets.

== Station layout ==
Mineola has two side platforms and three tracks, both slightly-offset to accommodate 12 cars. The middle express track allows trains to bypass the station. The main station house is on the north side of the tracks, at Front Street and Mineola Boulevard. The station is wheelchair accessible and has a crossover for pedestrians. A smaller, enclosed shelter existed on the opposite (south) side of the tracks prior to being demolished as part of the LIRR's third track project. The Oyster Bay Branch diverges at a junction just east of the station.

Generally, westbound trains use Platform A and eastbound trains use Platform B – although all trains operating on the Oyster Bay Branch use platform A. The station is bypassed by select Port Jefferson Branch, Ronkonkoma Branch, and Oyster Bay Branch trains – as well as by most trains operating on the Montauk Branch.

== Bus terminal ==
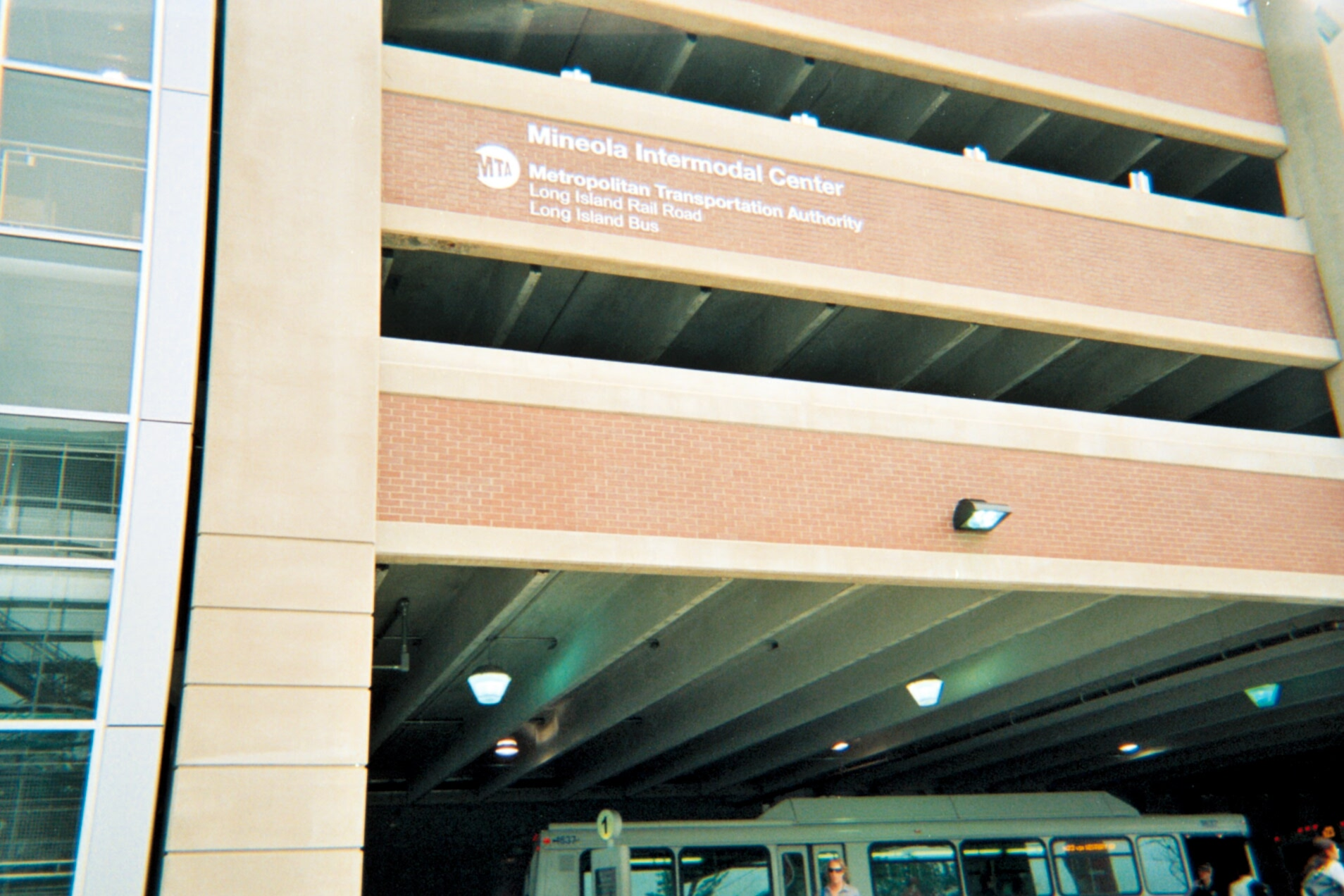
The Mineola Intermodal Center's bus station, as seen in June 2009.

Nassau Inter-County Express (NICE) operates bus service to the Mineola Intermodal Center's bus station, located on the south side of the hub's Long Island Rail Road station. Prior to the opening of the intermodal center on October 16, 2006, bus stops were located at Third Street, a block away from the station.

As of March 2025, five NICE routes stop at this facility, as well as local taxicab services.

Route	Termini		Via
n15	Terminus	Long Beach LIRR station	County Seat Drive, Woodfield Road, Long Beach Road (rush hours only)
n22	Jamaica at 165th Street; Bus Terminal	Hicksville; LIRR Station	Hillside Avenue, Westbury Avenue, Prospect Avenue, West John Street: via Roosevelt Field
n23	Terminus	Manorhaven	Mineola Boulevard, Willis Avenue, Main Street (Roslyn), Port Washington Boulevard, New Shore Road
n24	Jamaica at 165th Street; Bus Terminal	Hicksville; LIRR Station	Hillside Avenue, Jericho Turnpike, Old Country Road: via Roosevelt Field
n40 & n40x	Terminus	Freeport; LIRR Station (n40) or Baldwin (n40x)	Franklin Street, Columbia Street, Main Street (Hempstead), Nassau Road/North Main Street

== See also ==
- Transportation on Long Island
- List of Long Island Rail Road stations
- Great Neck station
- Ronkonkoma station
- Rosa Parks Hempstead Transit Center
