= Oyster Bay station =

Long Island Rail Road station in Nassau County, New York

Oyster Bay
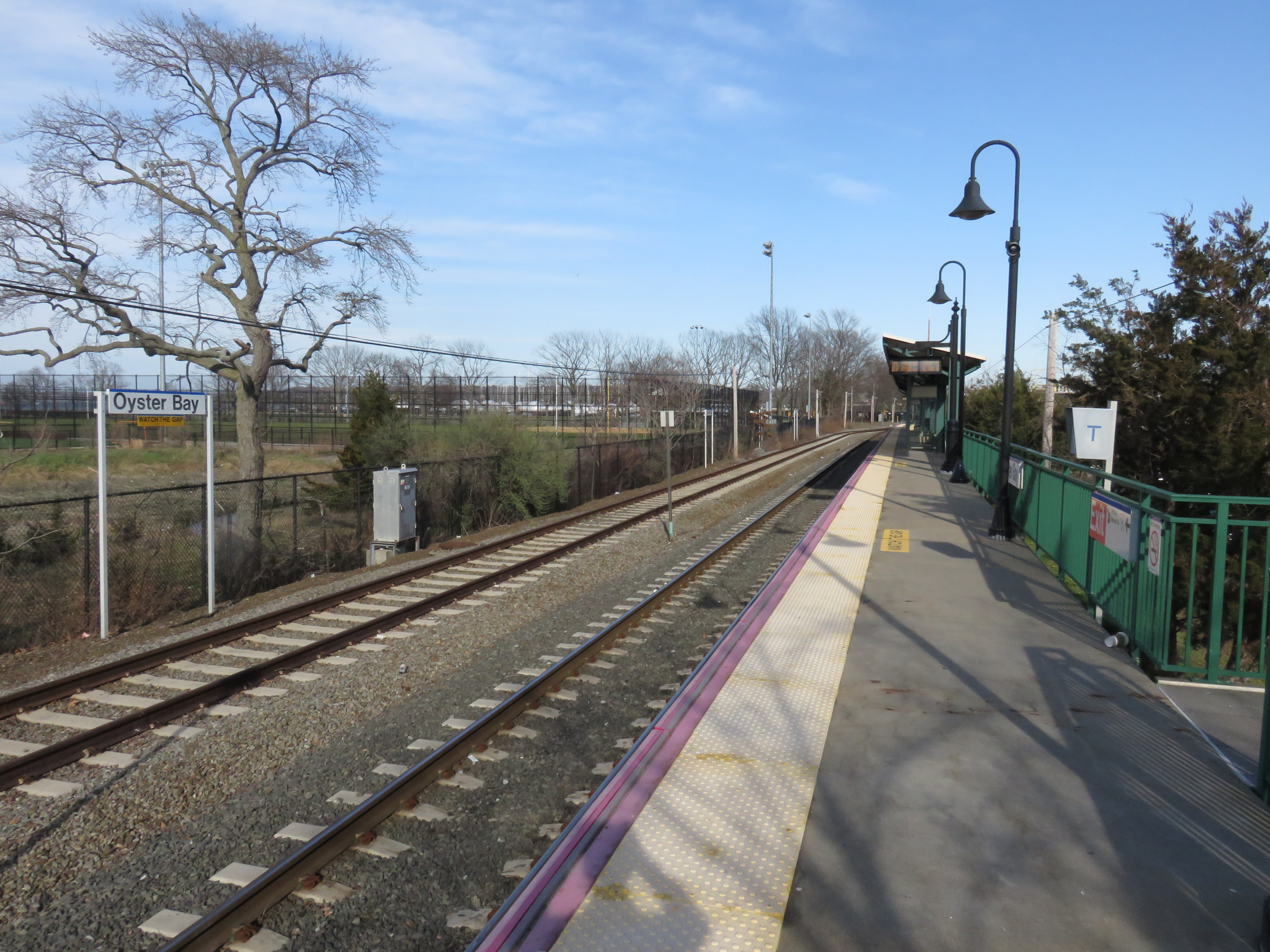
- The Oyster Bay station, as seen in 2016

General information
- Location: Shore & Maxwell Avenues; Oyster Bay, NY
- Owner: Long Island Rail Road; Town of Oyster Bay
- Line: Oyster Bay Branch
- Distance: 32.9 mi (52.9 km) from Long Island City
- Platforms: 1 side platform
- Tracks: 2
- Connections: Oyster Bay Taxi

Construction
- Parking: Yes; Free
- Accessible: Yes

Other information
- Station code: OBY
- Fare zone: 7

History
- Opened: June 24, 1889
- Rebuilt: 1902, 1999

Passengers
- 2012—2014: 286 per weekday

Services
| Preceding station | Long Island Rail Road | Following station |
|---|---|---|
| Locust Valley toward Penn Station, Jamaica or Long Island City | Oyster Bay Branch | Terminus |
Former services
| Preceding station | Long Island Rail Road | Following station |
|---|---|---|
| Mill Neck toward Penn Station, Jamaica or Long Island City | Oyster Bay Branch | Terminus |
- Oyster Bay Long Island Rail Road Station
- U.S. National Register of Historic Places
- Location: Railroad Avenue, Oyster Bay, New York, USA
- Coordinates: 40°52′29.97″N 73°31′53.77″W
- Architectural style: Tudor Revival
- NRHP reference No.: 05000666
- Added to NRHP: July 6, 2005
Location

Oyster Bay is the terminus on the Oyster Bay Branch of the Long Island Rail Road, located off Shore Avenue between Maxwell and Larabee Avenues, within the hamlet of Oyster Bay in Nassau County, New York, United States. It has a concrete high-level platform that stands in the shadows of the original station, which was accessible from the ends of Maxwell, Audrey, and Hamilton Avenues. The station is also located along the south side of Theodore Roosevelt Memorial Park.

No bus services are available for the station, however local taxicabs do stop.

== Overview ==
The original Oyster Bay station opened on June 24, 1889 and remodeled in 1902. At one point there were plans to extend the line east towards the Port Jefferson Branch. There was also a large pier built to facilitate the loading of passenger cars onto a short-lived ferry to Wilson's Point in South Norwalk, Connecticut that is now owned by the Flowers Oyster Company.

The original Oyster Bay Station passenger depot and the Oyster Bay Long Island Rail Road Turntable were both listed separately on the National Register of Historic Places on July 6, 2005. Additional efforts were started about that time to transform the former station house into a railroad museum; the building was subsequently restored and reopened as the Oyster Bay Railroad Museum.

== History ==
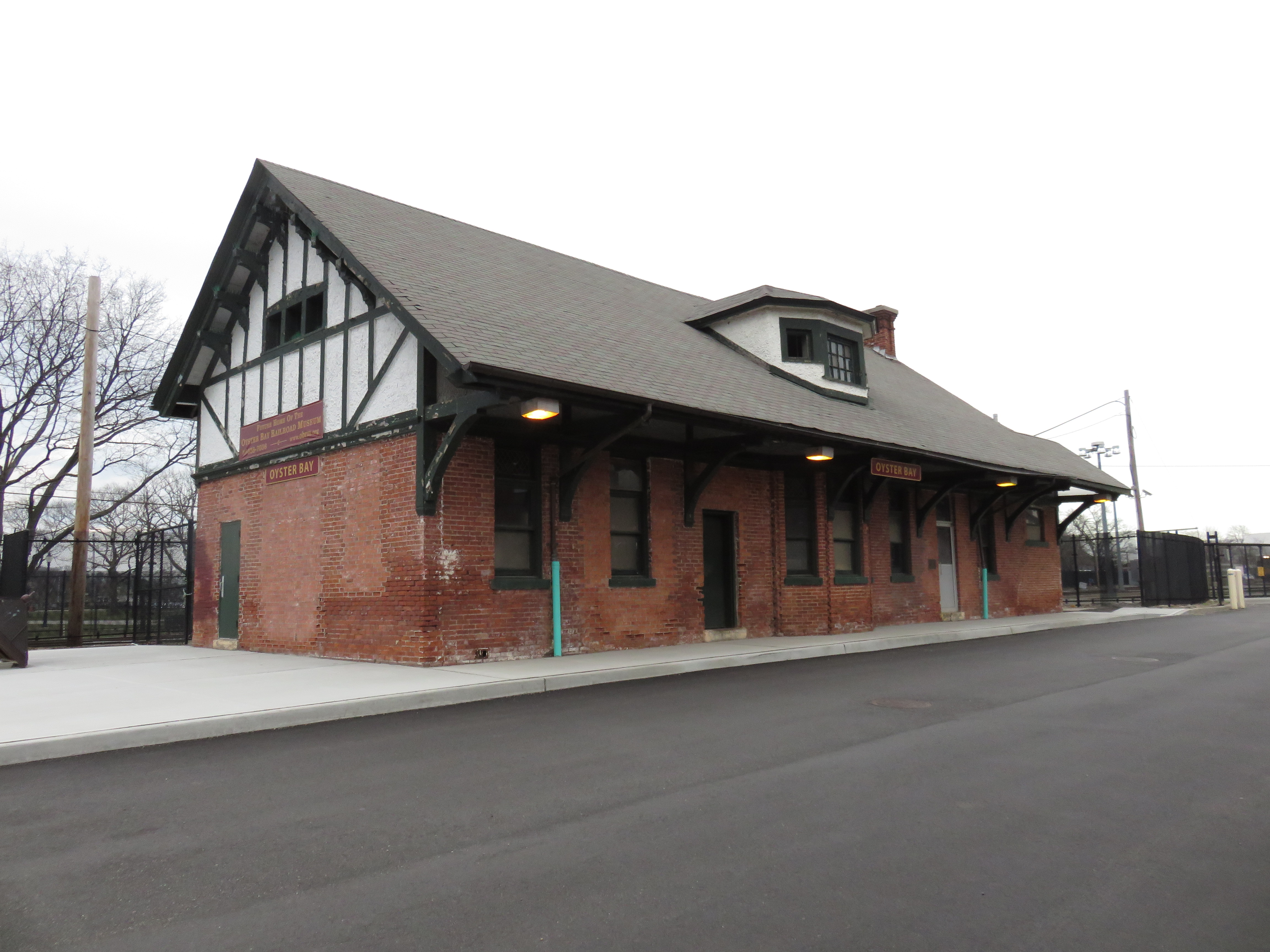
The original Oyster Bay station – now a museum

On June 24, 1889, the Oyster Bay Extension Railroad, a subsidiary of the Long Island Railroad, extended the terminus of its rail line from Locust Valley to Oyster Bay and constructed this beautiful Victorian train station on land donated by Col. Robert Townsend. Service began with eight round trips operating from Long Island City. The original station had a large wooden platform and an elegant porte cochere, a covered porch large enough for horse-drawn carriages to pass through.

In 1891, the Long Island Rail Road connected the land to the sea via a 1,000-foot-long (300 m) wharf that enabled rail cars full of passengers to be loaded onto a ferry. This ferry, called the Cape Charles would take passengers to Connecticut where the railways would be connected to the Housatonic Railroad and continue on to Boston. This unique service from New York to Boston ceased operations when a land route across Connecticut was built.

On September 9, 1891, Locomotive No. 113 exploded while idling in the station awaiting passengers. People as far away as East Norwich felt the force of the blast; three crewmen were killed.

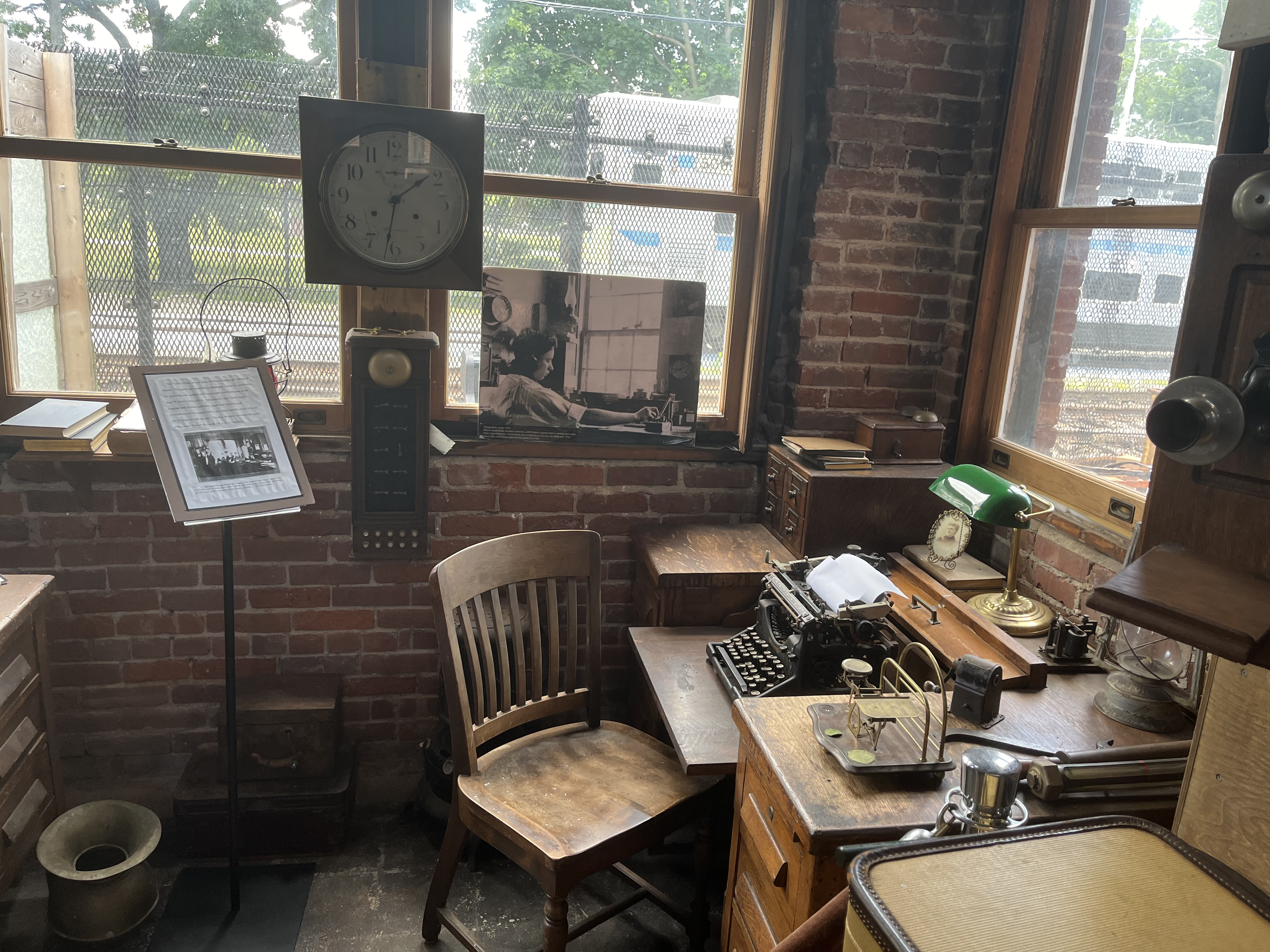
Inside the restored Oyster Bay Station Depot

When Theodore Roosevelt became President of the New York City Police Board in 1895, he commuted regularly through this station, and when he became President of the United States in 1901, a huge expansion of the station was planned to accommodate the expected rise in visitors to the hamlet. Those 1902 renovations included the removal of the porte cochere and the addition of 400-foot-long (120 m) weather sheds. Inside the station, a large fireplace and tiled hearth were added, and on the exterior a special stucco was used that contained real oyster shells.

The architect for the 1902 renovations was Bradford Lee Gilbert, who also designed the 1898 renovations to the previous version of Grand Central Terminal.

At the end of the 20th century, the station fell into a state of disrepair. The station was repaired and rebuilt with a high-level platform in the 1990s to be made compliant with the Americans with Disabilities Act of 1990 and to accommodate the LIRR's new C3 coaches; the new platform opened in 1999.

=== Railroad museum ===
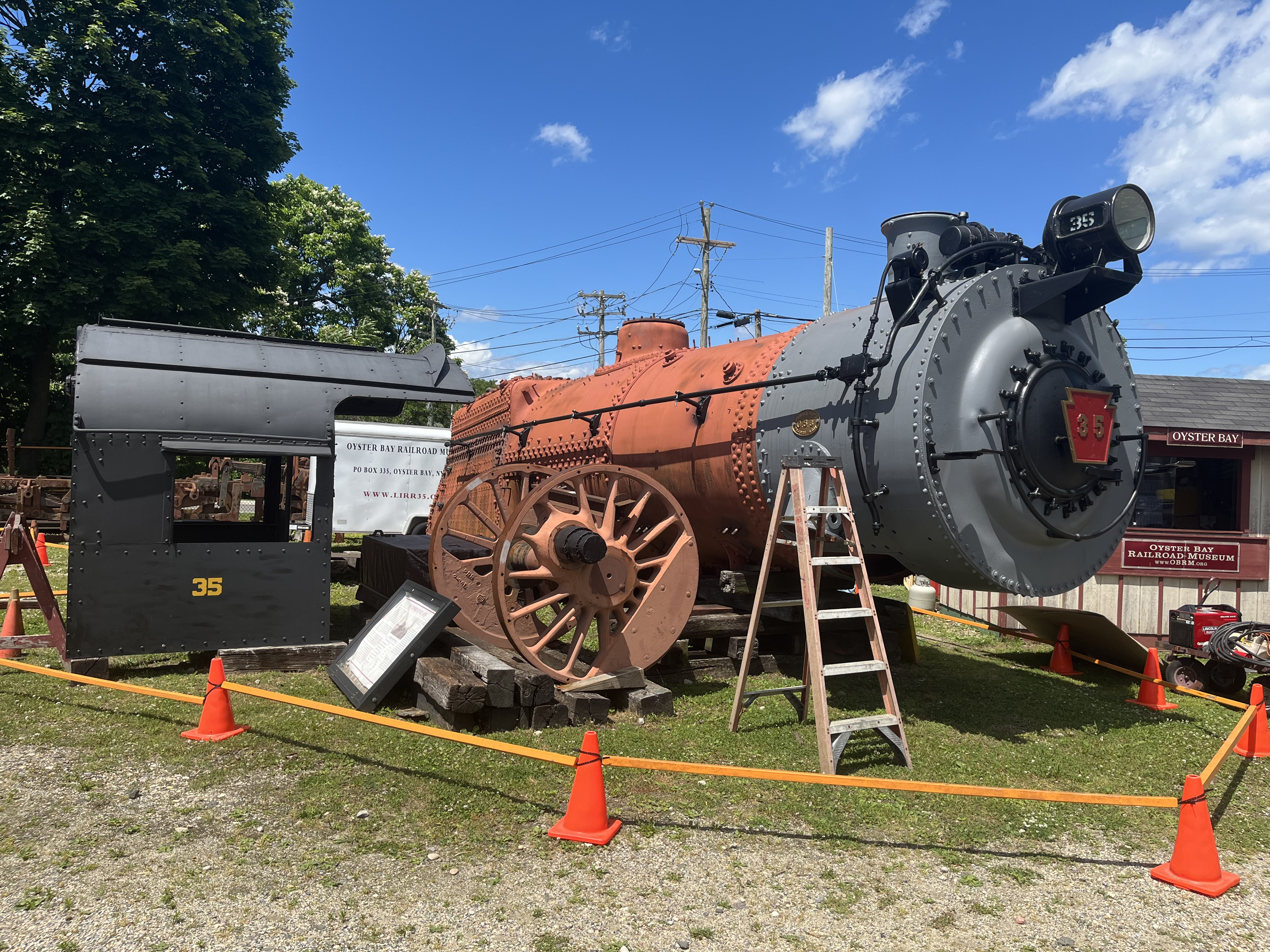
LIRR Steam Locomotive #35

The Oyster Bay Railroad Museum – a New York state historical/educational not-for-profit museum – is working on the museum with the Town of Oyster Bay. The original LIRR Oyster Bay railroad station is now owned by the Town of Oyster Bay, rather than the LIRR. Various engineering and architectural studies and reviews in order to restore the depot into a museum have been completed. As a result, The Oyster Bay Railroad Museum has transformed the original Oyster Bay station depot into the new home of the Oyster Bay Railroad Museum.

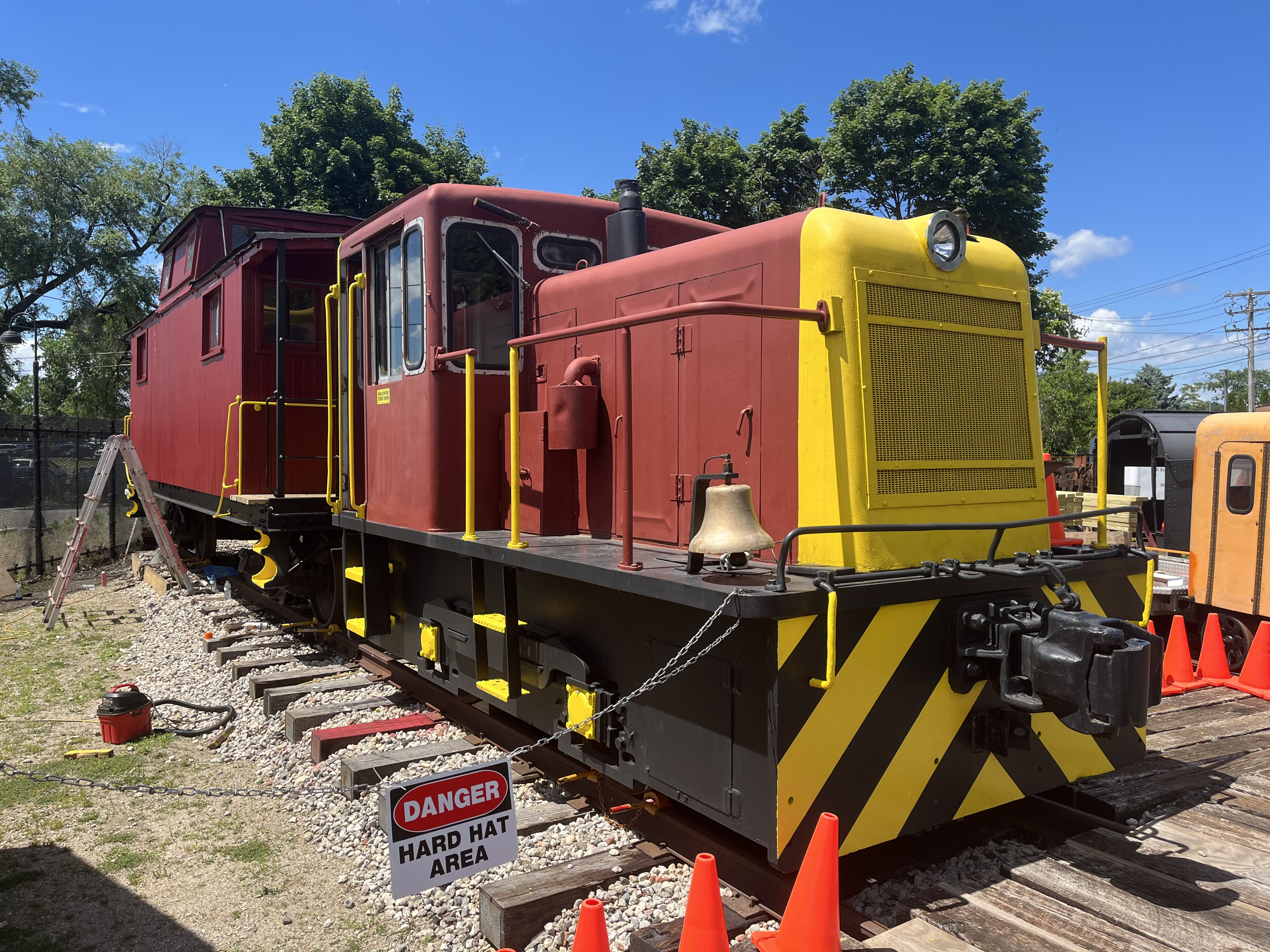
LIRR GE 25 Ton Diesel Electric "Dinky" #398, soon to be re-numbered 26 in Honor of Theodore Roosevelt

The original station is open weekends from April to November as one of two locations for the railroad museum – the other being a small open air yard and turntable site on the east side of Theodore Roosevelt Memorial Park, a short walk from the station. There are three cab simulators – each donated to the museum by the Long Island Rail Road from their Hillside Maintenance Facility – based on the M1, M7, and DE30AC, that visitors can enter and explore. As of October 2024, volunteers were able to restore and get the LIRR M7 Simulator running with Train Sim World software, used with special permission from Dovetail Games. As of March 2025, the DE30AC Simulator was being restored, in order to make it operable again.

Since 2022, other major improvements to the Oyster Bay Turntable site have been happening. Three new yard tracks have been built, a classic LIRR "Ping Pong" Coach, originally used on the Knox and Kane Railroad in Pennsylvania, was being restored, and repairs to former LIRR G5s 4-6-0 #35 – which had been the main focus of the museum's work – progressed, with recent activity and fundraising for the repair of the locomotive’s parts. Additionally, the museum has been making efforts to introduce train rides. A GE 25 Ton Diesel Switcher, formerly LIRR #398, has been restored to operating condition to run the future train rides. This engine will eventually be renumbered 26, in Honor of Theodore Roosevelt – the 26th President of the United States. In conjunction with the #26, Long Island Rail Road caboose #12 – built in 1927 – will carry passengers. The trains rides will operate onto the restored 1902 turntable. As of March 2025, the museum has been making preparations to build an "escape track", to facilitate the said train ride operations, and allow for future maneuverability for the #35 to eventually be displayed both on and off Track 3.

== Station layout ==
This station has one high-level side platform, four cars long, located adjacent to the south track. The north track, not adjacent to the platform, is a passing siding, which rejoins the south track and leads to a seven-track yard just beyond the station.

The old station building lies just east of the new station. The Theodore Roosevelt Memorial Park is just to the north of the siding track.

== Turntable ==
- Oyster Bay Long Island Rail Road Turntable
- U.S. National Register of Historic Places
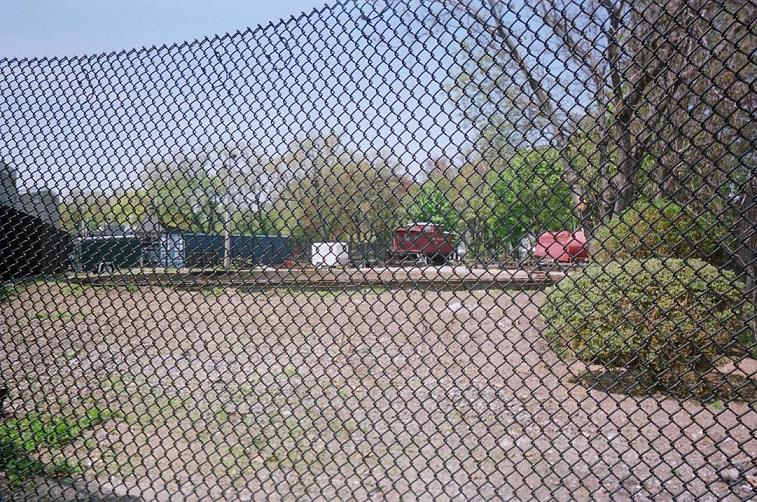
- Oyster Bay Station Turntable (behind chainlink fence).
- Location: 40°52′29.8″N 73°31′42.9″W; Railroad Avenue, Oyster Bay, New York, USA
- Built: 1902
- NRHP reference No.: 05000667
- Added to NRHP: July 6, 2005

Oyster Bay contains one of the only remaining Long Island Rail Road stations with an original turntable on site. The Oyster Bay Long Island Rail Road Turntable was built in 1902 to replace a smaller one that had been relocated from the Locust Valley station.

The turntable – which is listed on the National Register of Historic Places separately from the station – is also a Town of Oyster Bay Landmark, and is a featured site on the Oyster Bay History Walk audio walking tour.

== See also ==
- History of the Long Island Rail Road
- Oyster Bay History Walk
- List of Town of Oyster Bay Landmarks
- National Register of Historic Places listings in Nassau County, New York
