= Freeport–Roslyn Expressway =

Unbuilt highway on Long Island, New York

- Freeport–Roslyn Express Highway

Route information
- Length: 12.5 mi (20.1 km)
- History: Proposed 1951; cancelled 1952

Major junctions
- South end: Freeport
- North end: Roslyn

Location
- Country: United States
- State: New York
- Counties: Nassau

Highway system
- New York Highways; Interstate; US; State; Reference; Parkways

The Freeport–Roslyn Expressway (also known as the Freeport–Roslyn Express Highway) was a proposed north–south controlled-access highway, that would have run between Freeport and East Hills – in the vicinity of Roslyn – in Nassau County, on Long Island, in New York, United States.

The highway was cancelled due to community opposition and associated highway revolts. Instead, the Meadowbrook State Parkway, which originally had its northern terminus on the Freeport-Merrick border, was extended to Carle Place, where it meets the Northern State Parkway at the Westbury Interchange.

== History ==
The Freeport–Roslyn Expressway was proposed in 1951, and would have been a "cross-island feeder"—or "leg"—of the Horrace Harding (Long Island) Expressway's extension to Roslyn (and eventually to Riverhead). The highway would have featured a total of 10 lanes, and had an estimated price tag of $40,000,000 (equivalent to $386 million in 2024). Though the plans were supported by Freeport's Northeast Civic Association, citing economic benefits, the expressway was quickly met with fierce community opposition, notably by the Freeport–Roslyn Expressway Protest Committee, which successfully garnered tens of thousands of signatures, as well as nearly $20,000 (equivalent to $189,000 in 2024), from people that were against the expressway's construction. This led to the Freeport–Roslyn Expressway proposal being postponed by Nassau County circa March 1952, and ultimately being cancelled that October.

The Meadowbrook State Parkway was extended from Freeport to the Northern State Parkway in Carle Place instead, completed in 1956 reusing the funds for the cancelled expressway.

== Route description ==
=== Southern segment: Freeport to Baldwin ===
The section of the expressway between Freeport and Baldwin would have been located parallel (and adjacent) to Milburn Creek. Its southern terminus would be located at Atlantic Avenue. It would follow the creek and Brookside Avenue, traverse the former Milburn Golf Club, and go along the Baldwin side of the Milburn Reservoir.

In addition to running adjacent to Milburn Creek, this routing would have also straddled the school district boundaries, meaning students would not need to cross to the other side of the expressway to get to and/or from school.

=== Middle segment ===
The middle segment would have brought the expressway through the heart of Nassau County, providing access to places such as Hempstead, Garden City, Roosevelt Field, and Mineola.

=== Northern segment ===
The northern segment would have followed (or paralleled) the alignment of Glen Cove Road, connecting to the Long Island Expressway (its parent route) in East Hills, in the vicinity of Roslyn.

== See also ==
- Western Nassau Expressway
- County Route 7 (Nassau County, New York)
- Seaford-Oyster Bay Expressway
- Highway revolts in the United States
