= Hesta Prynn =

American rapper

- Born: Julie Potash
- Origin: New York City
- Genres: Alternative hip hop, Indie rock
- Years active: 2010–present
- Formerly of: Northern State
- Members: Hesta Prynn
- Past members: Chuck Brody
- Website: hestaprynn.com

Julie Potash, also known as Hesta Prynn, is an American musician, singer, and rapper from Long Island, New York. She began her career in music as one-third of the all-female hip hop group Northern State. After the band broke up she started focusing on solo material. In July 2010 she released an EP titled Can We Go Wrong and followed it with a second EP, We Could Fall in Love, in August 2012. As of 2012, she lives in New York City and travels the world as a DJ and pop music ghostwriter.

== Biography ==
=== Northern State ===
Hesta Prynn is a founding member of Northern State, along with Correne "Spero" Spero and Robyn "Sprout" Goodmark, who all met while attending high school in the 1990s. In this group she took her moniker from Hester Prynne, the protagonist of The Scarlet Letter. The group was initially formed as a joke, but eventually became fairly successful, receiving critical acclaim from Rolling Stone magazine and touring with artists such as Tegan and Sara. They have released three albums. After the last Northern State album was completed, all three members started working on their own material. There are no definite plans yet for Northern State to record another album.

=== Can We Go Wrong ===
Prynn's first solo EP, called Can We Go Wrong, was released in July 2010 and has received positive reviews from Time Out New York and NME. The six-track EP was produced and co-written by Chuck Brody, who, at the time, also served as her live guitarist. The sound of her solo material is more electronic-based than her work with Northern State, utilizing dance beats in combination with 90's-style electric guitars. When describing Hesta Prynn's solo musical style, the New York Post referred to her as "MIA and Miike Snow's lovechild" and named her the #4 Artist to Watch in 2010.

September 2010 marked the release of a stop-motion video for the song "Can We Go Wrong" composed of 13,000 still images. The video was directed by NYC indie director Randy Scott Slavin (videethis.com) and received much attention including a feature on MTV's "The Seven". Jared Leto of Thirty Seconds to Mars was intrigued by the video and took Hesta Prynn on tour in late 2010.

Following the release of the Can We Go Wrong EP, Prynn has played with Andrew WK, Jay-Z and Avi Buffalo and has collaborated with Neon Indian, Bear Hands, Les Savy Fav's Tim Harrington and remixer RAC. The title track "Can We Go Wrong" has been featured in ads for Ray-Ban and Nylon Fashion TV. Hesta Prynn toured Europe with Tegan and Sara in the summer of 2010 and played Wireless Festival in London's Hyde Park on July 4, 2010.

In August 2010, Hesta Prynn launched the first part in a series of webisodes titled Hesta Prynn & Friends, which features backstage footage with Tegan and Sara, Chuck Brody, photographer Lindsey Byrnes, and UK grime rapper Scorcher. In a similar fashion, Hesta Prynn (along with Sara Quin) appeared in Kaki King's video for "Pull Me Out Alive".

=== Pepper ===
In September 2010, relatively shortly after the release of the Can We Go Wrong EP, Hesta Prynn released a 7" vinyl single titled Pepper with two previously unreleased tracks. The A-side is a cover of the Butthole Surfers' song "Pepper" and is a collaboration with Shawn Crahan, aka "Clown", from Slipknot. The B-side is a song called "Seven Sisters", the song that started off her solo project with Chuck Brody. Following the release, Clown invited Prynn and Slavin to Iowa to film the video for "Seven Sisters," which AOL called "a dark, sexy precursor to the slasher thriller The Strangers.

As of December 2010 Hesta Prynn shared some of her personal interests outside of music with the world. Hesta is an avid fan of horror movies which, as she has explained in interviews, often inspire her lyrics. Because of this particular interest, she has been given her own column on Artist Direct titled "Oh the Horror with Hesta Prynn", in which she writes film reviews in the horror genre.

=== Turn It Gold ===
In February 2011 UK record label Too Pure, which is part of Beggars Banquet, released Turn It Gold on vinyl. Turn It Gold is being played on BBC Radio 6 Music including Steve Lamacq's show. A provocative video also directed by Slavin depicting Hesta Prynn in various states of undress was released in conjunction with the single. She subsequently went on a European tour to promote this release.

A remix of Turn It Gold was featured in a Verizon Super Bowl commercial in Feb 2012.

=== We Could Fall in Love ===
On August 28, 2012, Hesta Prynn both announced and released her second EP We Could Fall in Love which features a dance-based club sound and features production by Mad Decent's Derek "DJA" Allen, DJ Teenwolf formerly of Ninjasonik, and newcomer Ido vs the World. Prynn teamed up with Slavin for the video which features neon colors, x-ray images and a VHS aesthetic. Of the new sound, Prynn says, "I'm a child of the '90s. I'm a New York City hip-hop kid inspired by LA dance music. I like to put it all together."

=== DJ career ===
In 2011 Hesta Prynn's DJ set from the Bonnaroo Festival was featured in The New York Times. Since then she has developed a successful DJ career and performed at events for clients including Vogue magazine. She can also be seen as a host on Michael Hirschorn's YouTube Channel and for Logo TV interviewing artists like Robyn and The Strokes.

She also appeared as a guest model for designer Daryl K's spring 2011 line and walked in her runway show during Fashion Week in Feb 2011.

== Discography ==
=== Solo releases ===
EPs

- Can We Go Wrong (2010)
- We Could Fall in Love (2012)

Singles

- "Pepper" 7" vinyl (2010)
- "You Winding Me Up" 7" vinyl (2010)
- "Turn It Gold" 7" vinyl (2011)

=== With Northern State ===
Albums

- Dying in Stereo (2002, Star Time/Wichita)
- All City (2004, Sony)
- Can I Keep This Pen? (2007, Ipecac)

EPs

- Hip Hop You Haven't Heard (2002)
- At the Party (2005, Wichita)
- Better Already (2007, Kanine)
