= Northern State =

Northern State(s) may refer to:

- Northern State (band), an American hip-hop group
- Northern State Parkway, Long Island, New York
- Northern State (Sudan)
- Northern State University, Aberdeen, South Dakota
- Northern United States
- Union (American Civil War), states that did not secede during the American Civil War

== See also ==
- Uttar Pradesh (lit. Northern State), India
