= Can We Go Wrong =

EP by Hesta Prynn
- Released: 6 July 2010
- Genres: Indie rock, Alternative hip hop
- Length: 18:15
- Label: Reynolds Recording Co./For Fire Music
- Producer: Chuck Brody

Hesta Prynn chronology
Can We Go Wrong (2010)	Pepper (2010)

Singles from Can We Go Wrong
- 1. "Can We Go Wrong" Released: September 2010; 2. "You Winding Me Up" Released: 8 December 2010

Alternative cover

Can We Go Wrong is the first solo EP by Hesta Prynn, formerly of the band Northern State. It was officially released on July 6, 2010, but was available weeks earlier through her own website and at her live concerts as the support act for Tegan and Sara. Even before its official release, the album received a positive review from Time Out New York.

In September 2010 Hesta Prynn released a video for the song "Can We Go Wrong". The video is a stop-motion video composed of 13,000 still images. The video was directed by NYC indie director Randy Scott Slavin (videethis.com) and received much attention including a feature on MTV's "The Seven". Jared Leto of Thirty Seconds to Mars was intrigued by the video and took Hesta Prynn on tour in late 2010.

On December 8, 2010 the song "You Winding Me Up" was releases as a special 7" vinyl single containing two remixed versions of the song. The first is a mash-up with Blondie's Heart of Glass and the second is a remix by Bear Hands.

== Track listing ==
All tracks are written by Hesta Prynn & Chuck Brody, except where noted.

No.	Title	Length
1.	"You Winding Me Up" (Prynn, Brody, Jon Siebels)	2:22
2.	"Motive"	3:02
3.	"Le Coq Aux Folles"	3:05
4.	"Can We Go Wrong" (Prynn, Brody, Siebels)	3:10
5.	"Whoa Whoa" (Prynn, Brody, Siebels)	3:37
6.	"Recall"	2:59
Total length:		18:15

== Personnel ==
- Hesta Prynn – vocals, keyboards
- All other instrumentation by Chuck Brody and Jon Siebels

== Additional personnel ==
- Eric Gardner – drums
- Nate Smith – drums
- Randy Schrager – drums
- Ainsley Powell – drums
- Peter Vartan – guitar
- Jack Dolgen – bass

== Reception ==
Professional ratings
Review scores
Source	Rating
PopMatters	8/10 stars
AudioSuede	(80%)

PopMatters commented on her change in style orientation from hip-hop to dance and an increase in seriousness saying: "Compared to the verbose rhymes of her jokey Northern State work, Prynn is downright laconic here. She’s crafty with hooks, too, and the half-wordless chorus of “Whoa Whoa” owes its amorphousness not to nonchalance, but necessity; after a certain point in the night, words are irrelevant."
