= Hip Hop You Haven't Heard =

EP by Northern State
- Released: 2002
- Genres: Hip-hop, pop rap
- Length: 17:16
- Label: Self-released

Northern State chronology
Hip Hop You Haven't Heard (2002)	Dying in Stereo (2002)

Hip Hop You Haven't Heard is the debut EP by New York City-based rap group Northern State. It was self-released in 2002, and was originally intended to be a demo. As of 2003, it had gone out of print.

== Reception and impact ==
Hip Hop You Haven't Heard ended up getting Northern State a considerable amount of exposure, with some critics comparing its sound to early Beastie Boys music. Pitchfork also noted the sincere sound of their rapping on the EP. One favorable review the album received was written by Robert Christgau, who gave it a four star (out of five) review in Rolling Stone. This review, in which Christgau praised Northern State as "everything you want underground hip-hop to be", sparked criticism from other rap critics, who argued that the band was guilty of cultural appropriation. The review has also been credited with helping the EP, and by extension Northern State themselves, get more publicity.

== Track listing ==
No.	Title	Length
1.	"The Man's Dollar"	3:29
2.	"Dying In Stereo"	4:46
3.	"A Thousand Words"	3:36
4.	"Rewind"	5:25
