= Police Officer Joseph P. Olivieri Jr. Memorial Bridge =

Bridge in New York, United States

Joseph P. Olivieri Memorial Bridge
- Coordinates: 40°46′07.1″N 73°41′30.2″W
- Carries: New Hyde Park Road
- Crosses: Long Island Expressway
- Locale: North Hills, New York, United States
- Named for: Joseph P. Olivieri
- Owner: NYSDOT
- Maintained by: NYSDOT

Characteristics
- Design: box girder
- Material: Prestressed concrete
- Total length: 138 feet (42 m)

History
- Built: 2000

Location
- Interactive map of Joseph P. Olivieri Memorial Bridge

The Police Officer Joseph P. Olivieri Jr. Memorial Bridge is a highway overpass in North Hills in the Town of North Hempstead in Nassau County, on Long Island, in New York, United States. It carries New Hyde Park Road over the Long Island Expressway (Interstate 495). It is named in honor of Joseph P. Olivieri Jr., a police officer who was killed nearby on the line of duty.

== Description ==
The bridge was built in 2000, replacing an older span. It is of a box beam/girder design and is made of prestressed concrete. It is 138 feet (42 m) long, and is owned and maintained by the New York State Department of Transportation.

In 2013, the bridge was named the Joseph P. Olivieri Memorial Bridge in honor of Officer Joseph P. Olivieri, who was killed on the line of duty nearby when a truck crashed into his vehicle. The bill which proposed naming the bridge was signed and ultimately approved by Governor Andrew M. Cuomo.

The bridge is located at 40°46'07.1"N 73°41'30.2"W.

The bridge's New York State bridge identification number is 1049019.

== See also ==
- Police Officer Michael J. Califano Memorial Bridge – Another bridge spanning the Long Island Expressway within Nassau County.
