= All City (Northern State album) =

Studio album by Northern State
- Released: August 17, 2004
- Genre: Pop rap
- Length: 41:34
- Label: Columbia

Northern State chronology
Dying in Stereo (2002)	All City (2004)	Can I Keep This Pen? (2007)

All City is the second full-length album by New York City-based hip-hop group Northern State, released on August 17, 2004, on Columbia Records. It is also their major-label debut, as it was their first album released for Columbia. It has also been described as their first "real record", because some do not consider their debut album Dying in Stereo to be a full-length album, but an EP. The album's first single was "Girl for All Seasons", for which a music video was made at the Siberia club in New York City.

== Recording ==
All City was recorded in Philadelphia with a handful of guest artists, including Martin Luther McCoy (on "Siren Song"), Har Mar Superstar (on "Summer Never Ends"), and the High & Mighty (on "Think Twice"). Also contributing to the album's recording were ?uestlove, as well as DJ Muggs of Cypress Hill, and Pete Rock, both of whom helped produce the album.

== Critical reception ==
Professional ratings
Aggregate scores
Source	Rating
Metacritic	69/100
Review scores
Source	Rating
AllMusic	3/5 stars
Elle Girl	3.5/4
The New York Times	mixed
Rolling Stone	3/5 stars
Spin	C+
Stylus Magazine	A
The Village Voice	A

All City received generally favorable reviews from music critics and was named one of the 50 best albums of 2004 by Rolling Stone.

== Track listing ==
No.	Title	Length
1.	"Ignite"	3:51
2.	"Girl for All Seasons"	2:56
3.	"Nice With It"	3:45
4.	"Last Night"	3:28
5.	"Think Twice"	4:13
6.	"Don't Look Down"	4:00
7.	"Siren Song"	3:39
8.	"Style I Bring"	3:58
9.	"Time To Rhyme"	4:30
10.	"Speaking for Me"	3:33
11.	"Summer Never Ends"	3:38

== Personnel ==
- Jim Bottari – engineer, mixing
- Chuck Brody – engineer
- Katie Cassidy – additional personnel, guitar, harp, photography
- Thera L. Choice – beat box, drum programming, organ, piano
- Fusako Chubachi – design
- Chris Conway – engineer
- DJ Drez – additional personnel, cut
- DJ Mighty Mi – audio production, producer
- Chris Fargo – additional personnel, guitar
- John Fields – acoustic bass guitar, additional personnel, bass, beats, guitar (electric), producer, synthesizer, wurlitzer, wurlitzer piano
- Mark Grant – engineer
- Mike Halpern – additional personnel, drums, percussion
- Steven Halpern – additional personnel, bass, drum programming, guitar, guitar (bass), keyboards, organ, piano, programming
- Michael Halsband – cover photo, photography
- Har Mar Superstar – additional personnel, featured artist, guest artist, primary artist, vocals
- The High & Mighty – additional personnel, featured artist, guest artist, vocals
- Rob Hill – additional personnel, bass, engineer, guitar, keyboards, mixing, programming, strings, synthesizer
- Dana Klein – additional personnel, vocals
- Thera L – additional personnel, drum programming, organ, piano
- Alice Lord – additional personnel, violin
- Rogelio Lozano – bass, guitar
- Colin Malley – interpretation
- Manifest – audio production, producer
- Mr. Eon – additional personnel, vocals
- Mister Wohlsen – engineer
- Muggs – audio production, producer
- Peter Phillips – mixing, producer
- Hesta Prynn – group member, member of attributed artist, piano, vocals
- Damian Quiñones – additional personnel, piano, reproduction, sound effects, vocals
- Geoffrey Rice – assistant engineer
- Pete Rock – additional personnel, audio production, vocals
- Johnny Rodeo – engineer
- Sami Ryan – assistant engineer
- Skotch Rockie – bass
- Spero – engineer, member of attributed artist, vocals
- Sprout – drum machine, drums, group member, member of attributed artist, photography, vocals
- Jamey Staub – engineer, mixing
- Yutakha – engineer
- Grover Zinn – engineer
