= Police Officer Michael J. Califano Memorial Bridge =

Bridge in New York, United States

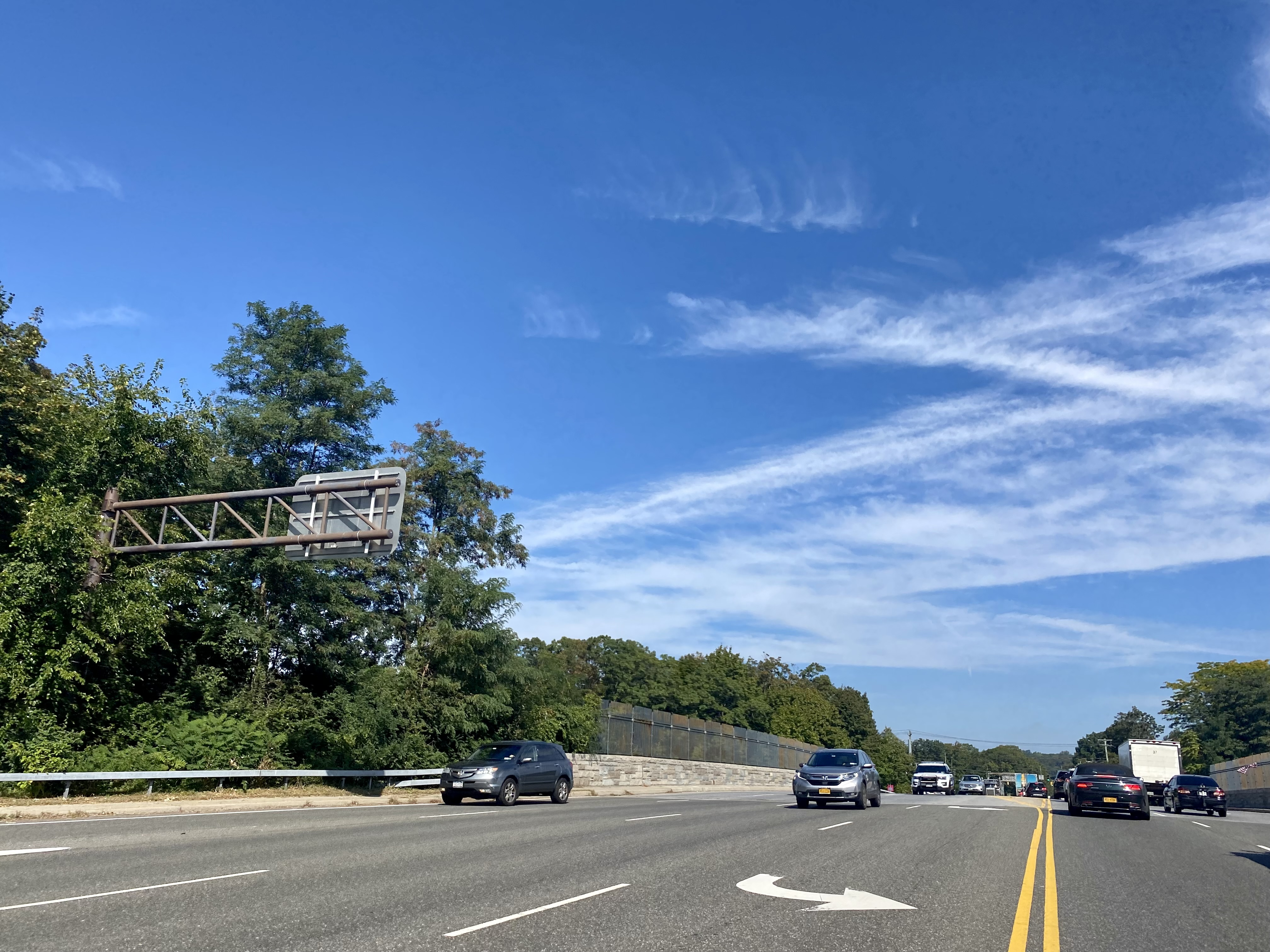
- The bridge in 2021, looking north
- Coordinates: 40°46′59.9″N 73°37′23″W
- Carries: Glen Cove Road
- Crosses: Long Island Expressway
- Locale: East Hills and Old Westbury, New York, United States
- Named for: Michael J. Califano
- Owner: NYSDOT
- Maintained by: NYSDOT

Characteristics
- Design: Steel stringer bridge
- Total length: 169 feet (52 m)

History
- Built: 2000

Location
- Interactive map of Police Officer Michael J. Califano Memorial Bridge

The Police Officer Michael J. Califano Memorial Bridge is a highway overpass in East Hills and Old Westbury in the Town of North Hempstead in Nassau County, on Long Island, in New York, United States. It carries Glen Cove Road (Nassau County Route 1) over the Long Island Expressway (Interstate 495). It is named in honor of Michael J. Califano, a police officer who was killed nearby in the line of duty.

== Description ==
The bridge is located at 40°46'59.9"N 73°37'23.0"W, along the border between the villages of East Hills and Old Westbury.

The bridge's New York State bridge identification number is 1049090.

== History ==
The bridge was built in 2000, replacing an older span. It is of a steel stringer design. It is 169 feet (52 m) long, and is owned and maintained by the New York State Department of Transportation.

In 2011, the bridge was named the Police Officer Michael J. Califano Memorial Bridge in honor of Officer Michael Califano, who was killed on the line of duty nearby when a truck crashed into his vehicle. The bill which proposed naming the bridge was drafted by New York State Senator Charles J. Fuschillo Jr. and New York State Assemblywoman Michelle Schimel. It was co-sponsored by Senators Kemp Hannon, Carl L. Marcellino, Jack M. Martins, and Dean G. Skelos. It was signed and ultimately approved by Governor Andrew M. Cuomo.

== See also ==
- Police Officer Joseph P. Olivieri Jr. Memorial Bridge – Another bridge spanning the Long Island Expressway within Nassau County.
- William Cullen Bryant Viaduct – A major bridge in nearby Flower Hill and Roslyn.
