= Westbury Interchange =

Highway interchange on Long Island, New York

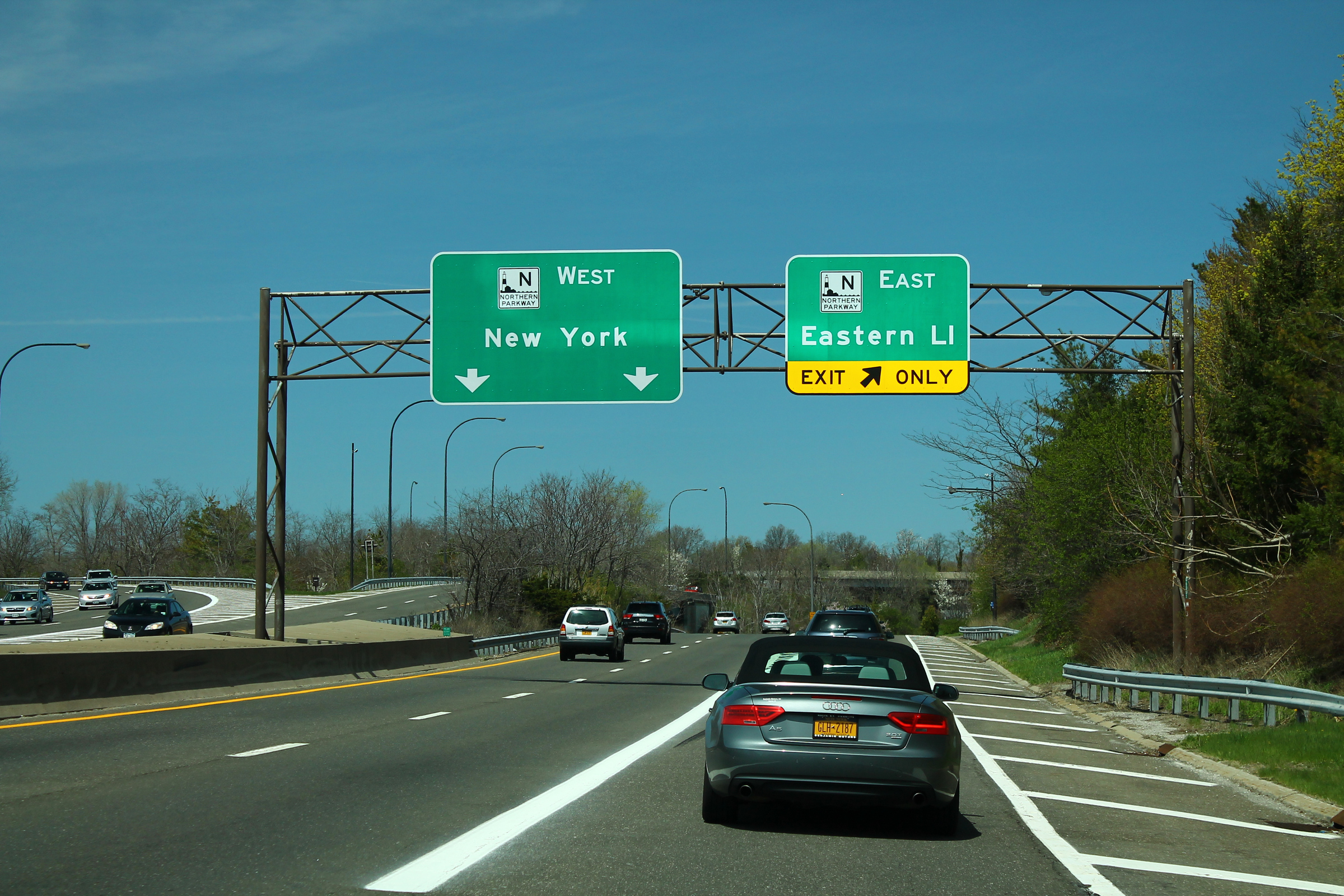
- Signage for the Northern State Parkway at the interchange, on the ramp from the northbound Meadowbrook Parkway
- Interactive map of Westbury Interchange

Location
- Westbury and Carle Place
- Coordinates: 40°45′18.1″N 73°37′01.3″W
- Roads at junction: Meadowbrook State Parkway; Northern State Parkway; Jericho Turnpike (NY 25); Glen Cove Road

Construction
- Type: Semi-directional T interchange
- Constructed: 1956
- Reconstructed: 1968, 1988–1991, 2022–2023
- Maintained by: NYSDOT

The Westbury Interchange is a highway interchange located in Carle Place and the Incorporated Village of Westbury in the Town of North Hempstead, in Nassau County, Long Island, New York, United States.

== Description ==
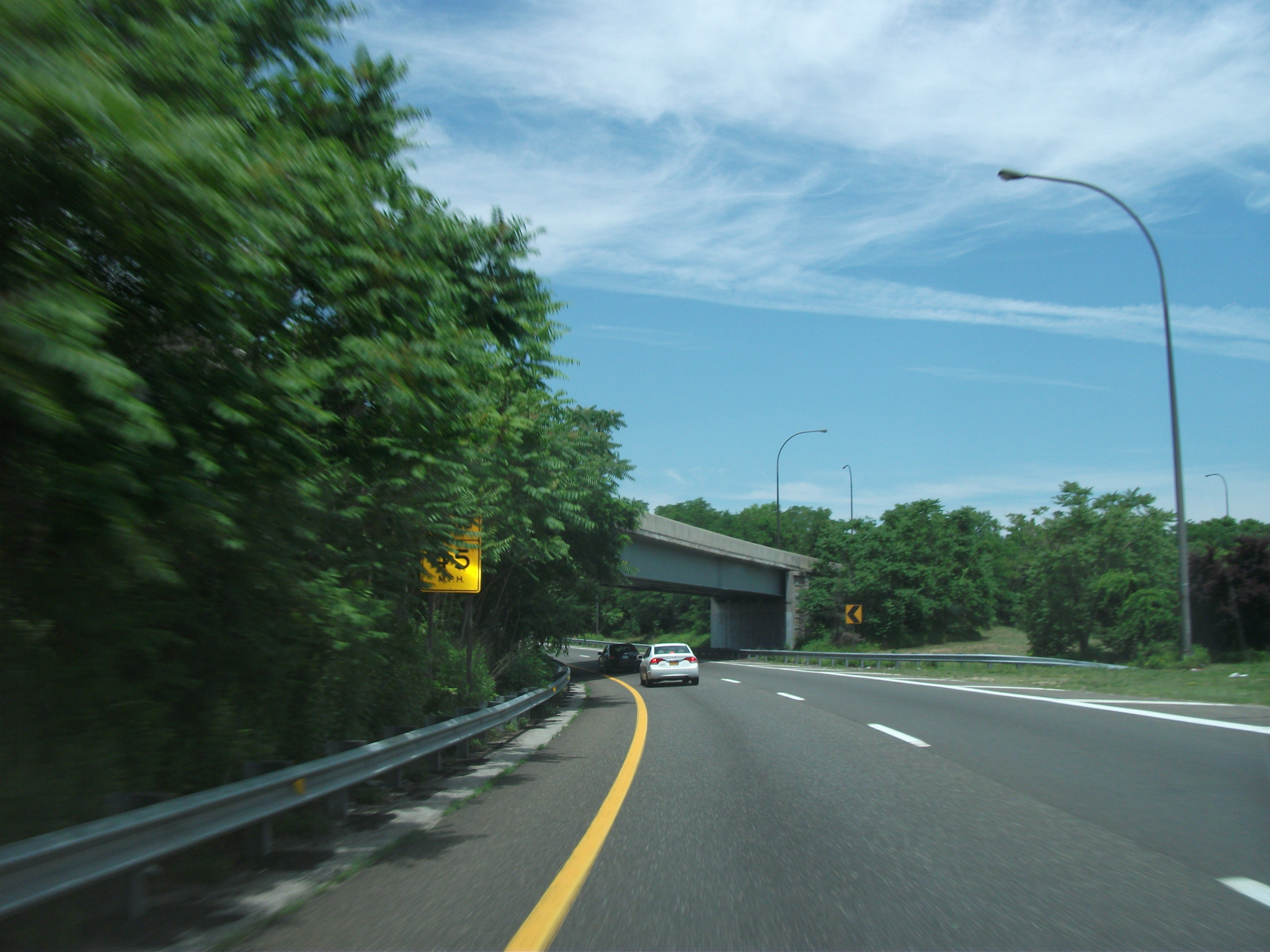
The interchange's ramp to the westbound Northern State Parkway.

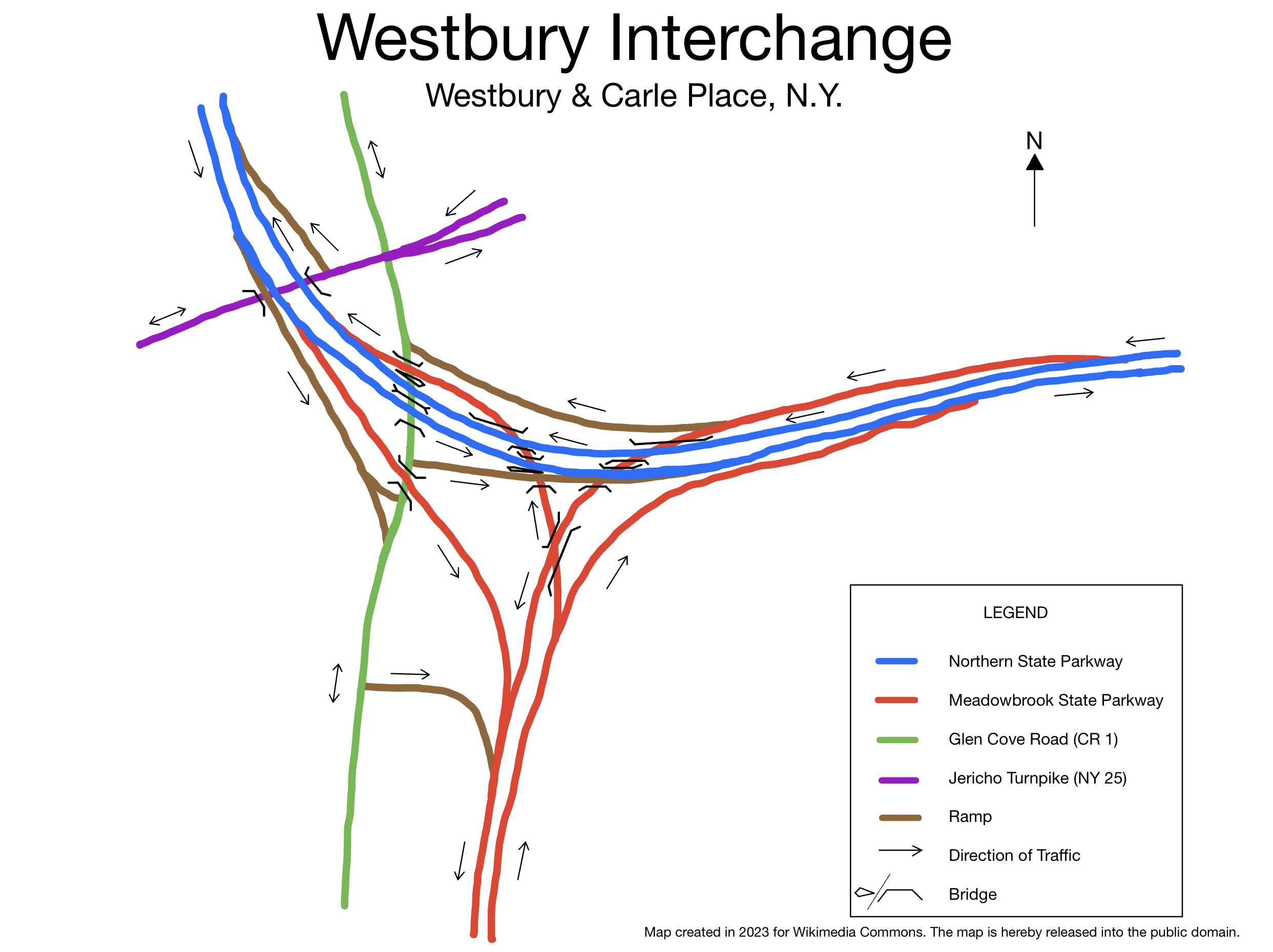
A diagram of the Westbury Interchange.

The interchange is a semi-directional T interchange, connecting two major, controlled-access parkways: the Meadowbrook State Parkway and the Northern State Parkway; it also connects the two parkways to two major surface arterial routes: Jericho Turnpike (NY 25) and Glen Cove Road (CR 1).

The interchange consists of three levels: Glen Cove Road and Jericho Turnpike are at ground level, the ramps connecting the Northern & Meadowbrook State Parkways are on the middle level, and the Northern State Parkway is on the top level. Ramps also connect the parkways to Glen Cove Road and Jericho Turnpike.

The majority of the interchange is within the Incorporated Village of Westbury, while the extreme southern portions are within the hamlet and CDP of Carle Place.

== History ==
The interchange was constructed between the Meadowbrook and Northern State Parkways in 1956, when the Meadowbrook Parkway was extended north to the Northern State Parkway. It underwent a reconfiguration in 1968. In the late 1980s, the interchange was again reconfigured, with the goal of improving the connectivity between the two parkways. The controversial project was completed in 1991.

In 2022, it was announced that another modernization project would be undertaken. The $3.8 million project would mitigate bottlenecks on Glen Cove Road and Jericho Turnpike. One such feature added as part of this project was a raised median barrier on Glen Cove Road to prevent illegal turns from being made. Construction was underway by December of that year, continuing into 2023. The project was completed in late December 2023.

=== 1980s reconstruction controversy ===
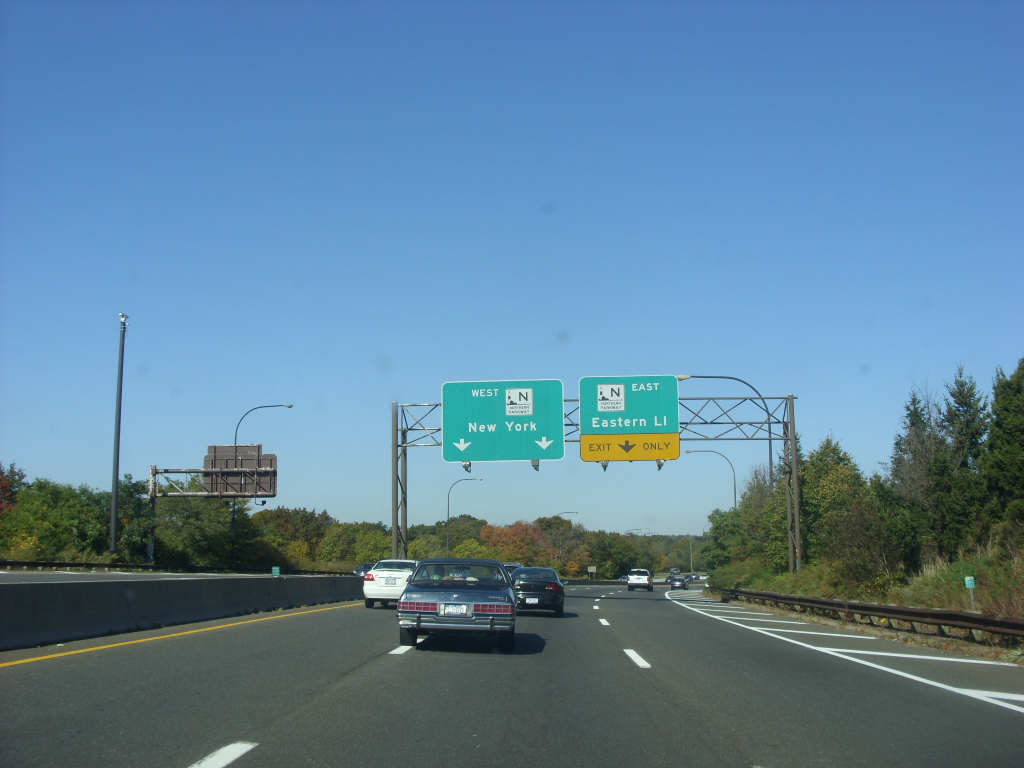
Approaching the interchange from the northbound Meadowbrook Parkway.

A major reconstruction project was carried out in the late 1980s, costing $61 million (1989 USD). Although it was previously redesigned in 1968, it was still the site of about 180 accidents per year—over six times the statewide average for accident frequency. The junction was to be rebuilt with three lanes in each direction for the Northern State Parkway in the middle of exit 31A, a direct ramp between the westbound Northern State Parkway and the southbound Meadowbrook, connections from Glen Cove Road to both parkways, and the relocation of exit and entrance ramps within the interchange. Construction began in May 1988, and the project was expected to be completed on October 31, 1991. It was proceeding on schedule until the Village of Westbury filed a suit against NYSDOT in February 1989. The lawsuit claimed that NYSDOT did not follow proper environmental guidelines while designing the project because their environmental impact report failed to consider the impacts of a nearby future widening project on the Northern State Parkway. This widening project, considered a second phase of the interchange reconstruction, had no intended date of construction.

The Appellate Division of the New York State Supreme Court ruled that NYSDOT had to provide a new environmental report by May 12, 1989 or face having the reconstruction shut down. The order by the court reversed a decision by the New York State Supreme Court that determined that a revised report was unnecessary. Residents of Westbury claimed that the project would bring noise concerns to the village, along with a spillover of diverted traffic to local roads. Concerns were also stated by then-mayor Ernest Strada about Westbury's water supply and potential impacts from the project. NYSDOT claimed that no disruption would be caused by the project, but Strada insisted there were still concerns. Strada also stated that the village had no interest in shutting down the project; rather, they wanted to ensure that their community would be protected from any disruptions caused by the reconstruction. On April 24, NYSDOT announced they had appealed the stoppage of work on the interchange, which had been suspended pending a ruling by the Court of Appeals, the highest court in the state.

On December 19, 1989, the Court of Appeals announced their decision on the case of Village of Westbury v. Department of Transportation of the State of New York, et al., ruling in favor of Westbury. In its decision, the court stated NYSDOT should have issued a joint report for the interchange and widening projects because both projects improved the flow of traffic on the Northern State Parkway and thus were related. The ruling made by the previous court was affirmed, and NYSDOT was advised to consider the environmental impacts of projects on other nearby projects in the future. While the village of Westbury was praising Ernest Strada for taking on the state, residents of the hamlet of Carle Place felt they were being taken hostage by his actions and that the stoppage of work was hurting their community more than Westbury. Editorials in Newsday also called the mayor "parochial and overzealous".

While Carle Place was complaining about the inability to access their section of town, a January 1990 article in The New York Times mentioned that the Court's decision put Westbury alone against the state, then-Governor Mario Cuomo and regional planners, who were worried about the safety of the roughly 140,000 drivers who used the interchange daily. Local business leaders claimed that Westbury was being selfish in opposing inconvenient construction. Even after the ruling, Strada continued to claim that they wanted to be informed on the impacts of a nearby widening project on the Northern State. NYSDOT officials worried that this would add more bureaucratic levels to getting approval for local road projects and that it could set the project back three years. Officials also went out of their way to call this a simple "not in my backyard" case. NYSDOT continued to claim that the projects were separate, and filed three years apart, despite the court's ruling that they were similar projects. Cuomo, worried about the safety of drivers, invited Strada to come to Albany to meet with NYSDOT Commissioner Franklin White and State Senator Norman J. Levy to make an agreement. Strada, however, felt that in order to compromise, they would have to continue the original "violation" of not giving a report.

Westbury and NYSDOT came to a deal allowing construction to resume in February 1990, with lane changes and other modifications being made by the end of the month. This truce, made by Governor Cuomo, allowed work to resume at a normal pace, with nearly 200 workers doing daily work on the project by April 1990. The speed of progress on the reconstruction put the project back on track to meet the original October 1991 deadline. Mayor Strada, however, stated that he thought NYSDOT would not advance any work that would "need to be ripped up". The interchange reconstruction project was ultimately completed in 1991 as expected.

== See also ==
- Kew Gardens Interchange – another interchange on Long Island, in the New York City borough of Queens.
- Long Island State Park Commission
- Robert Moses
