= Northern State (band) =

American hip-hop group

- Origin: Long Island, New York, U.S.
- Genres: Alternative hip-hop, indie rock
- Years active: 2002–present
- Labels: Wichita Recordings, Ipecac Recordings, Columbia/SME Records
- Members: Spero, Sprout, Hesta Prynn
- Website: NorthernState.net

Northern State is an American female hip-hop/indie rock group from New York. The group consists of members Julie "Hesta Prynn" Potash, Correne "Spero" (previously "Guinea Love", due to her Italian heritage) Spero, and Robyn "Sprout" Goodmark. The group is named after the Northern State Parkway, one of the highways on Long Island.

== Biography ==
Sprout, Spero and Hesta Prynn attended Half Hollow Hills High School West and graduated in the 1990s. The group was first formed as a joke; Spero stated in 2003, "It was hilarious. Could you imagine three white girls from Long Island opening up their mouths and acting like they could rap?"

In 2002, the group released Hip Hop You Haven't Heard, a four-song collection, the songs from which ended up in remixed form on the 2003 EP Dying in Stereo, which was given a scathing review by Michael Idov in Pitchfork magazine. For their second album, All City, the group worked with Pete Rock, Questlove from the Roots, Har Mar Superstar, and DJ Muggs of Cypress Hill. It was released on Columbia/SME Records, but because of disagreements, the group left the label thereafter.

Northern State collaborated with producer Chuck Brody of Shitake Monkey (Wu-Tang Clan, Yoko Ono, etc.) and Ad-Rock from the Beastie Boys, among others, on their most recent album, Can I Keep This Pen?, which was released on Ipecac Recordings on August 28, 2007.

They have shared the stage in North America and Europe with The Roots, Le Tigre, Talib Kweli, De La Soul, The Gossip, Gym Class Heroes, Tegan and Sara, and Cake. Their songs "Better Already" and "Iluvitwhenya" were featured in season 4 episodes of the hit show Grey's Anatomy. Their song "Good Distance" was featured in the fifth episode of the show Damages.

The band appeared on an episode of Washington-based television show Pancake Mountain alongside Tegan and Sara.

Northern State covered "No Surprises" for Stereogum Presents... OKX: A Tribute to OK Computer, a tribute album to OK Computer by Radiohead.

== Discography ==
=== Albums ===
- Dying in Stereo (2002) Star Time/Wichita
- All City (2004) Columbia/SME Records
- Can I Keep This Pen? (2007) Ipecac

=== EPs ===
- Hip Hop You Haven't Heard (2002, self-released)
- At the Party (2005, Wichita)
- Better Already (2007, Kanine)
