= Can I Keep This Pen? =

Studio album by Northern State
- Released: August 28, 2007
- Genres: Alternative hip-hop, indie rock
- Label: Ipecac
- Producer: Chuck Brody

Northern State chronology
All City (2004)	Can I Keep This Pen? (2007)

Professional ratings
Aggregate scores
Source	Rating
Metacritic	67/100
Review scores
Source	Rating
AllMusic	3.5/5 stars
The A.V. Club	B+
Entertainment Weekly	A−
LAS Magazine	6/10
Now	NN
Pitchfork	5/10
PopMatters	6/10
Rolling Stone	2.5/5 stars
Spin	6/10
Sputnikmusic	3.5/5

Can I Keep This Pen? is the third album from New York-based rap trio Northern State. The album saw a slight departure in song styling, with some obvious pop/indie influences, and as many pop songs as traditional rap songs.

== Track listing ==
No.	Title	Length
1.	"Mic Tester"	1:47
2.	"Better Already"	2:57
3.	"Oooh Girl"	2:57
4.	"Mother May I?" (feat. Chuck Brody)	3:15
5.	"Away Away"	3:35
6.	"Good Distance"	3:25
7.	"Iluvitwhenya"	3:16
8.	"Sucka Mofo"	3:12
9.	"Cold War"	2:26
10.	"Run Off the Road"	2:33
11.	"Things I'll Do"	3:26
12.	"Cowboy Man"	3:41
13.	"Three Amigas" (feat. Murray Hill)	3:41
14.	"Fall Apart" (feat. Kaki King)	3:51
