= Dying in Stereo =

Studio album by Northern State
- Released: June 3, 2002
- Genre: Hip-hop
- Length: 32:37
- Labels: Startime International, Columbia

Northern State chronology
Hip Hop You Haven't Heard (2002)	Dying in Stereo (2002)	All City (2004)

Dying in Stereo is the second release by New York City-based alternative hip-hop group Northern State. It was first released on June 3, 2002, on Startime International, and then re-released in May 2003 by Columbia Records. It has been described variously as an EP and a "mini-album". Nevertheless, it is usually described as their official debut album, since their only previous release (Hip Hop You Haven't Heard) was a self-released four-song demo. This led PopMatters to describe it as a "litmus test" that will determine "what will happen to white, female, feminist rappers, who aren’t pencil-thin or supermodel pretty."

== Reception ==
The album received generally favorable reviews from critics. The exceptions to this trend included Pitchfork, which gave it a scathing review in which the reviewer, Michael Idov, described the album as "the most heinous hip-hop release since MC Skat Kat went solo", and Drowned in Sound, which described Northern State as "a pointless hybrid of the Beastie Boys and *N-tyce (from the female wing of the Wu)." Many other critics also compared Dying in Stereo's music to that of the Beastie Boys.

Professional ratings
Aggregate scores
Source	Rating
Metacritic	77/100
Review scores
Source	Rating
AllMusic	4/5 stars
Robert Christgau	A
Drowned in Sound	1/10
Entertainment Weekly	B+
NME	6/10
Pitchfork	0.8/10
PopMatters	(mixed)
Rolling Stone	4/5 stars
Spin	B

== Track listing ==
No.	Title	Length
1.	"A Thousand Words"	3:37
2.	"Trinity"	4:11
3.	"At the Party"	3:42
4.	"The Man's Dollar"	3:28
5.	"Vicious Cycle"	4:39
6.	"Signal Flow (You Can't Fade Me)"	4:07
7.	"All the Same"	4:05
8.	"Dying in Stereo"	4:47
