= Glen Cove Road =

Road on Long Island, New York

- Glen Cove Road and highlighted in red (Section maintained as NY 900B backed in blue)

Route information
- Maintained by NCDPW, NYSDOT, City of Glen Cove
- Length: 11.7 mi (18.8 km)
- Component highways: NY 900B (unsigned) from Greenvale to Glen Head; NY 107 from Glen Head to Glen Cove

Major junctions
- South end: Peninsula Boulevard in Hempstead
- NY 24 in Hempstead; Meadowbrook State Parkway in Carle Place; NY 25 / Northern State Parkway in Carle Place; NY 25B in Old Westbury; Northern State Parkway in Old Westbury; I-495 in Old Westbury; NY 25A in Greenvale; NY 107 in Glen Head
- North end: Glen Cove Avenue in Glen Cove

Location
- Country: United States
- State: New York
- Counties: Nassau

Highway system
- New York Highways; Interstate; US; State; Reference; Parkways

Glen Cove Road (also known as Cedar Swamp Road, Clinton Road, Clinton Street, Glen Cove Arterial Highway, Greenvale Glen Cove Road, Guinea Woods Road, and Pratt Boulevard) is a major, 11.7-mile-long (18.8 km) north–south thoroughfare running through north-central Nassau County on Long Island, New York, in the United States.

It is the main road leading to the communities on the east shore of Hempstead Harbor.

The portion from the North Hempstead–Oyster Bay town line to the intersection with Cedar Swamp Road (NY 107) is New York State Route 900B (NY 900B) – an unsigned reference route.

From there to Pulaski Street, it is New York State Route 107 (NY 107). This segment includes the Glen Cove Arterial Highway (also known as part of Pratt Boulevard) – an expressway that was intended to connect to a proposed bridge across the Long Island Sound to Connecticut. The limited-access section of the road is ceremoniously named Sergeant Major Daniel Joseph Daly Memorial Highway, in honor of Glen Cove native Daniel Joseph Daly.

== Route description ==
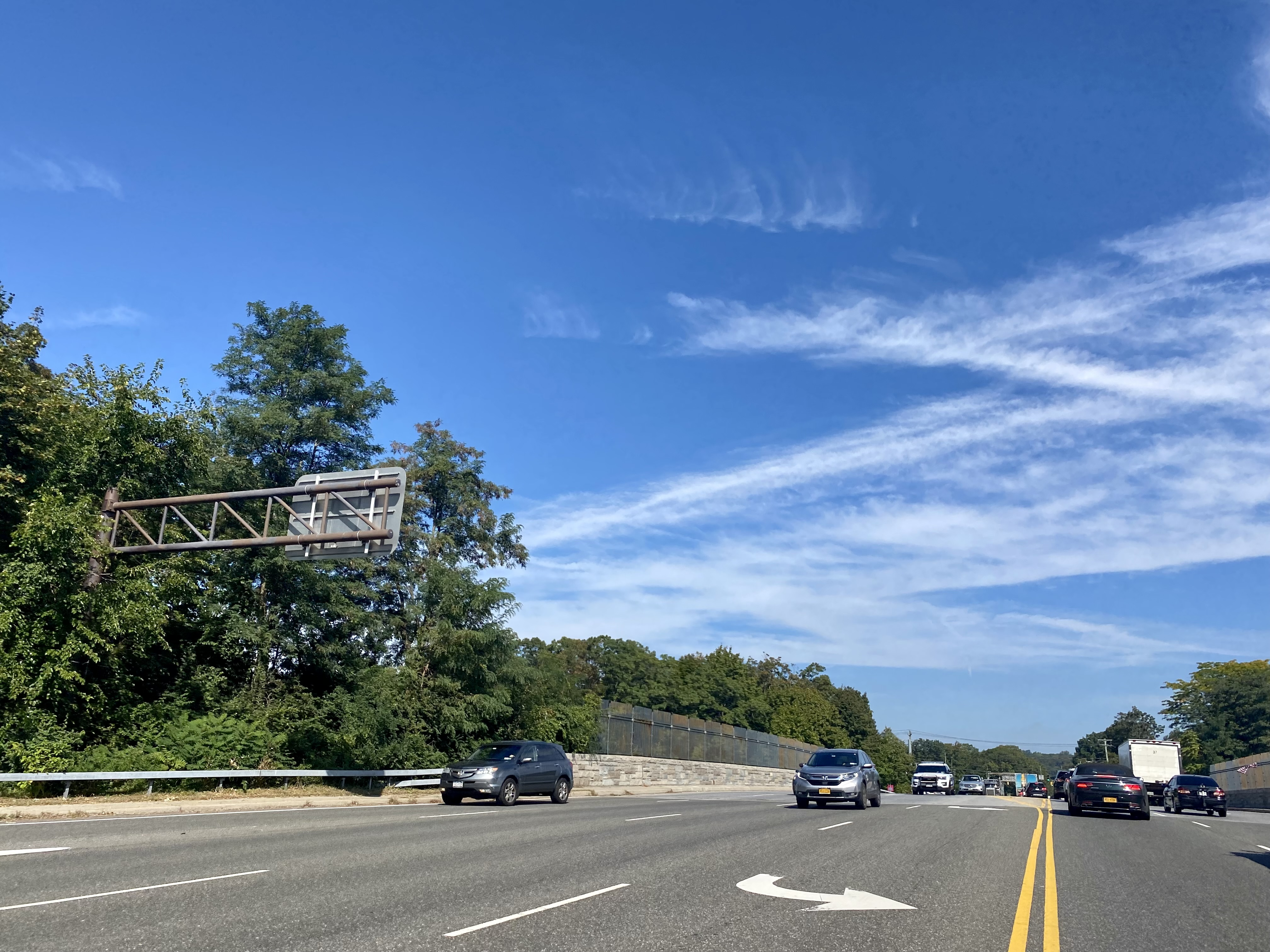
Glen Cove Road, at its crossing over the Long Island Expressway in 2021

=== Hempstead to Greenvale ===
The alignment of Glen Cove Road starts at Peninsula Boulevard in downtown Hempstead as Clinton Street. It travels north and northeast through Hempstead, eventually entering Garden City – at which point Clinton Street becomes Clinton Road. From there, Clinton Road continues north-northeast through Garden City until its intersection with Old Country Road – at which point it enters the Town of North Hempstead, in Carle Place, and becomes Glen Cove Road.

Glen Cove Road then continues north, crossing underneath the Main Line of the Long Island Rail Road. From there, it continues north for a distance, thence curving to the northwest to its intersection with Jericho Turnpike (NY 25), to steer clear of (and cross underneath) the Meadowbrook State Parkway and the Northern State Parkway.

From there, Glen Cove Road enters Old Westbury, where the road is concurrently signed as Guinea Woods Road. Continuing towards the north and northwest, the road soon intersects Hillside Avenue (NY 25B). It then continues north through Old Westbury, running parallel to (and serving as a frontage road for) the Northern State Parkway, intersecting I.U. Willets Road a short distance north of Hillside Avenue. From there, Glen Cove Road continues north-northeast, continuing to parallel the Northern State Parkway until the latter curves to the west; Glen Cove Road continues straight.

Continuing north-northeast, Glen Cove Road soon intersects eastbound Old Westbury Road, then immediately crosses over the Long Island Expressway (I-495), thence immediately intersecting westbound Old Westbury Road. It then enters East Hills, through which it continues to travel north, eventually reaching an intersection with Harbor Hill and Red Ground Roads. It then continues north through East Hills for a distance until reaching Town Path – at which point the road enters Greenvale. From Town Path, Glen Cove Road continues north through Greenvale, soon reaching Northern Boulevard (NY 25A), veering to the northeast on the north side of the intersection. From there, the road continues through Greenvale to Back Road and the North Hempstead–Oyster Bay town line – at which point the CR 1 designation ends and the road then continues as unsigned NY 900B.

This segment was once signed as part of Nassau County Route 1 until all county route numbers in Nassau County were removed in the 1970s.

=== Greenvale to Glen Cove ===
Soon after an intersection with NY 25A in Greenvale, Glen Cove Road becomes a four-lane boulevard and assumes the NY 900B designation – although the reference markers refer to it as NY 904. At an intersection with NY 107, the alignment assumes that route's number and name: Cedar Swamp Road. After another 1.4 miles (2.3 km) the alignment and the NY 107 designation forks to the left as a four-lane expressway known as Pratt Boulevard, while Cedar Swamp Road forks to the right as a surface street. A short distance later, NY 107 ends at an intersection with Pulaski Street, where Pratt Boulevard becomes a four-lane surface road. The road eventually ends at an intersection with Glen Cove Avenue near downtown Glen Cove.

== History ==
Glen Cove Road was once (as of 1959) part of an extended Nassau County Route 1, which reached as far south as Point Lookout and as far north as Centre Island. The current state designation for the route only includes the Clinton Road and Glen Cove Road alignment south of the North Hempstead/Oyster Bay town line, after which it becomes NY 900B and later NY 107 and CR 243. Route 900B had originally been NY 904 prior to the creation of the modern reference route system. The county route signage was removed in the mid-1970s because the county did not want to pay to replace the signs to conform to new federal standards.

The northernmost segment of NY 107, known as the Glen Cove Arterial Highway, was constructed in the mid-1960s. Built as a bypass of Glen Street, it would have served as the approach for the cancelled Rye-Glen Cove Bridge – one of two proposed bridges to connect Rye, New York with Long Island, via. the Long Island Sound.

The bridge carrying Glen Cove Road over the Long Island Expressway was named the Police Officer Michael J. Califano Memorial Bridge in 2011, in honor of a police officer who was killed nearby on the line of duty.

== Major intersections ==
The entire route is in Nassau County.

Location	mi	km	Destinations	Notes
Village of Hempstead	0.00	0.00	Peninsula Boulevard	Southern terminus
Village of Hempstead	0.06	0.097	Front Street	Former NY 102
Village of Hempstead	0.20	0.32	NY 24 (Fulton Avenue)	
Garden City	1.60	2.57	Stewart Avenue	
Carle Place	2.60	4.18	Old Country Road	
Carle Place	2.60	4.18	Transition between Clinton and Glen Cove Roads	
Carle Place	3.20	5.15	Meadowbrook State Parkway south – Jones Beach	
Westbury	3.40– 3.60	5.47– 5.79	Northern State Parkway east – Hauppauge	Access to and from Parkway east and from Parkway west; exit 31 on Northern State Parkway
Westbury–Old Westbury line	3.40– 3.60	5.47– 5.79	NY 25 (Jericho Turnpike) to Northern State Parkway west – Mineola, New York, Jericho	
Old Westbury	3.80	6.12	NY 25B (Hillside Avenue)	
Old Westbury	4.04	6.50	Northern State Parkway west	Access from Parkway west only; exit 31 on Northern State Parkway
Old Westbury	4.70	7.56	To Northern State Parkway east	Access via I.U. Willets Road
Old Westbury–East Hills line	5.40	8.69	I-495 – New York, Riverhead	Exit 39 on I-495
Greenvale	7.30	11.75	NY 25A (Northern Boulevard)	
Greenvale	7.70	12.39	Helen Street	
Greenvale	7.70	12.39	NY 900B begins	
Glen Head	9.40	15.13	Glen Head Road – Glen Head	
Glen Head	9.60	15.45	NY 107 south (Cedar Swamp Road); NY 900B ends	Southern end of NY 107 concurrency; northern terminus of NY 900B
Glen Head	10.40	16.74	Cedar Swamp Road – Sea Cliff	
Glen Head	10.40	16.74	Southern end of limited-access section Transition between Glen Cove Road and Pratt Boulevard	
Glen Cove	11.50	18.51	Pulaski Street NY 107 ends	Northern terminus of NY 107; at-grade intersection
Glen Cove	11.50	18.51	Northern end of limited-access section	
Glen Cove	11.70	18.83	Glen Cove Avenue	Northern terminus
1.000 mi = 1.609 km; 1.000 km = 0.621 mi: Concurrency terminus; Route transition

== See also ==
- List of county routes in Nassau County, New York
- Peninsula Boulevard
- New York State Route 107
