= Northern State Parkway =

Highway on Long Island, New York

Northern State Parkway
- Purple Heart Way
- Northern State Parkway highlighted in red

Route information
- Maintained by NYSDOT
- Length: 28.88 mi (46.48 km)
- Existed: July 15, 1933–present
- History: First section opened July 15, 1933; Full length opened June 9, 1965
- Restrictions: No commercial vehicles

Major junctions
- West end: Grand Central Parkway at the Little Neck–Lake Success line
- I-495 in Old Westbury; NY 25 / Meadowbrook State Parkway in Carle Place; Wantagh State Parkway in Westbury; NY 135 in Woodbury; I-495 in Woodbury; Sagtikos State Parkway / Sunken Meadow State Parkway in Commack
- East end: NY 347 / NY 454 in Hauppauge

Location
- Country: United States
- State: New York
- Counties: Nassau, Suffolk

Highway system
- New York Highways; Interstate; US; State; Reference; Parkways

The Northern State Parkway (also known as the Northern State or Northern Parkway) is a 28.88-mile (46.48 km) controlled-access parkway on Long Island in the U.S. state of New York. The western terminus is at the Queens–Nassau County line in Lake Success – west of which the parkway continues westward into New York City as the Grand Central Parkway. The eastern terminus is at New York State Route 347 (NY 347) and NY 454 in Hauppauge, in Suffolk County. As its name implies, the parkway services communities along the northern half of the island. The parkway is designated New York State Route 908G (NY 908G) – an unsigned reference route – and has been ceremoniously named Purple Heart Way since 2011.

In western Nassau County, the parkway features six lanes – three eastbound and three westbound, narrowing to four lanes in central Nassau at the Wantagh State Parkway (exit 33) and continuing east as such to its terminus in Hauppauge, Suffolk County. It was constructed in stages throughout the 1930s and again following World War II, in the late 1940s and early 1950s, until it reached its current terminus in Hauppauge in 1965. The Northern State Parkway is an eastern extension of the Grand Central Parkway. It was part of master planner Robert Moses' extensive road-building campaign and was built as a sister road to the Southern State Parkway. In recent years its design has quickly become dated due to an increase in commuter traffic using the roadway, and numerous improvements have been made (including the widening from four to six lanes in Central Nassau west to the Nassau–Queens line, where it becomes the Grand Central) or are still on paper.

== Route description ==
Like its siblings in the State Parkway system on Long Island, the Hudson Valley, and in New York City, commercial truck traffic is banned from the parkway due to low overpasses. The Long Island Expressway (Interstate 495) was built later on by Moses to handle truck traffic traveling between New York City and Long Island's famed East End. The Long Island Expressway runs directly alongside the Northern State in some parts of Nassau County.

=== Lake Success to Woodbury ===
The Northern State Parkway begins at the Queens–Nassau county line in front of the Towers Country Club in Little Neck, as an eastward continuation of the Grand Central Parkway. After crossing the county line, the Northern State proceeds east through Lake Success as a six-lane parkway, passing the northern end of the campus of Long Island Jewish Medical Center. A short distance east of the medical center, the parkway crosses under Lakeville Road and enters exit 25, which connects to Lakeville Road via Marcus Avenue. The parkway proceeds northeast through Lake Success, entering exit 26 which serves New Hyde Park Road. At this junction, the parkway remains in close distance of the Long Island Expressway (I-495). The parkway winds northeast through North Hills, approaching the eastbound lanes of the Long Island Expressway, but entering exit 27, which connects to Shelter Rock Road (County Route 8).

The Northern State and the Long Island Expressway begin paralleling each other in both directions, passing north of Searingtown. Just east of exit 36 on the expressway, the Northern State breaks away to the east for a short distance through Albertson, entering exit 28, which connects to Willis Avenue. The six-lane parkway continues eastward through Albertson, crossing under a railroad line and entering exit 29, which connects to Roslyn Road. The Northern State then enters Old Westbury, passing a large set of baseball fields. Now paralleling Glen Cove Road, the Northern State proceeds south into exit 30, I.U. Willets Road. A short distance to the south, the parkway enters Wheatley Hills Golf Club and into Carle Place.

Through Carle Place, the Northern State enters exit 31, which connects to NY 25, crossing under NY 25B (Hillside Avenue). Bending east, the parkway crosses over NY 25 (Jericho Turnpike), entering exit 31A, which serves the northern terminus of the Meadowbrook State Parkway in Westbury. After the interchange, the parkway proceeds northeast, passing under Carle Road in Westbury, entering The Hedges section, where exit 32, serving Post Road, interchanges. The Northern State then crosses through Birchwood Knolls and West Jericho as a six-lane parkway, where it enters exit 33, the northern terminus of the Wantagh State Parkway. After crossing under the southbound lane access ramp, the Northern State crosses under a flyover from the Wantagh northbound, then entering exit 34 in the town of Oyster Bay, which serves Brush Hollow Road.

Continuing east through Jericho Gardens, the Northern State Parkway proceeds northeast as a four-lane roadway, passing north of Cantiauge Park as it enters West Birchwood. In West Birchwood, the Northern State bends northeast, beginning a new parallel with the Long Island Expressway. Like at exit 27, approaching the expressway, the Northern State enters interchange 35, which serves the concurrency of NY 106 and NY 107 (North Broadway). After the cloverleaf interchange, the parkway enters East Birchwood on a parallel of the Long Island Expressway, which connects to the Northern State via exit 42. Like the previous parallel, the Northern State forks east away from the expressway, crossing over a one-track railroad line through Birchwood. A short distance after, the parkway enters exit 36, a cloverleaf interchange with South Oyster Bay Road (CR 9) before entering Woodbury.

=== Woodbury to Commack ===
In Woodbury, the Northern State Parkway continues east, crossing under Woodbury Road before entering a partial cloverleaf interchange with NY 135 (the Seaford–Oyster Bay Expressway). After NY 135, the parkway bends northeast, entering exit 37, which connects to Manetto Hill Road. A short distance after, the parkway enters another interchange with the Long Island Expressway (exit 37A) and an interchange with Sunnyside Boulevard (exit 38). Here, the route enters Trail View State Park before becoming a divided four-lane parkway through dense woods. The parkway makes a gradual bend to the east, then southeast, crossing the county line into Suffolk County just west of exit 39. Now in the town of Huntington, the Northern State enters exit 39, which serves Round Swamp Road.

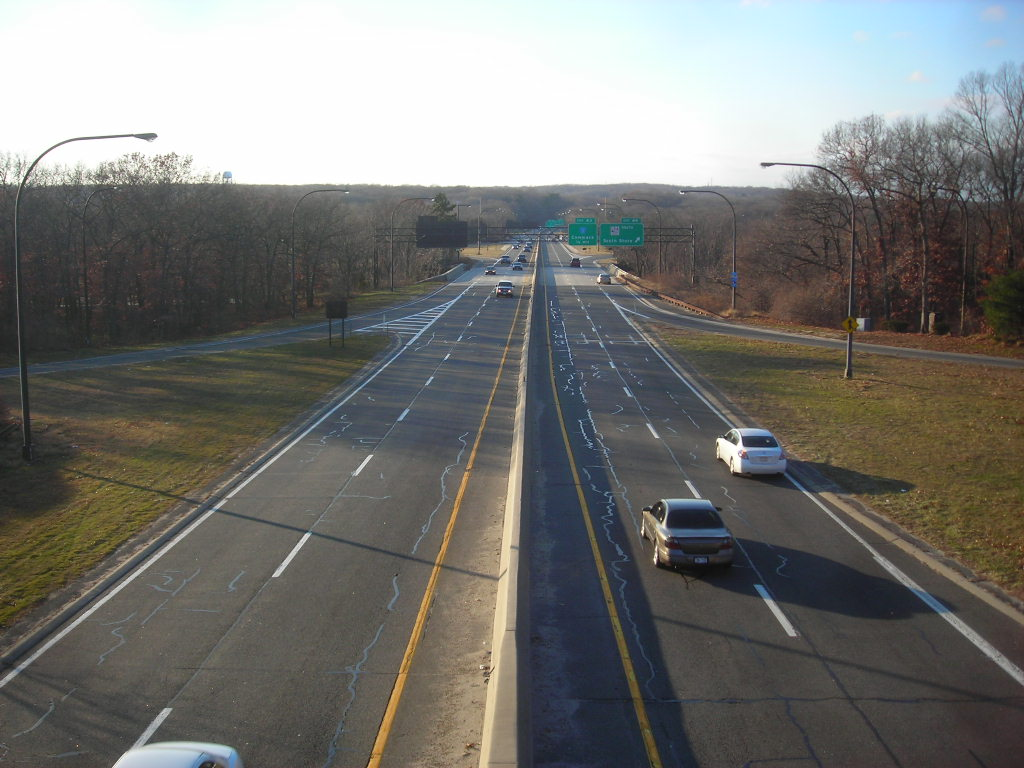
The Northern State as seen from the bridge from exit 45 in Commack

After exit 39, the Northern State Parkway proceeds eastward as a four-lane freeway, crossing through West Hills County Park, where it winds through dense woods east and southeast through Huntington. Passing north of a cemetery, the parkway enters exit 40, which was formerly a cloverleaf interchange with NY 110 (Walt Whitman Road). After exit 40, the Northern State proceeds northeast, passing south of Whitman Park before bending east once again near Old Country Road. The four-lane parkway becomes divided once again, crossing northeast through Huntington into exit 41, a diamond interchange with Wolf Hill Road. The parkway soon enters the Caledonia section of town, bending eastward under Dix Hills Road as it enters the Arista section of town. The parkway crosses back into Caledonia, entering a partial cloverleaf interchange with Deer Park Road (NY 231 and CR 35). This interchange serves as the northern terminus of NY 231.

After Deer Park Road, the Northern State Parkway bends northeast once again, leaving the Caledonia area before bending southeast as a four-lane parkway. A short distance later, the route enters the Vanderbilt section of Huntington, paralleling north of CR 67 (Vanderbilt Parkway). In Vanderbilt, the parkway enters exit 43, a junction with CR 4 (Commack Road). Immediately after crossing over Commack Road, the large cloverleaf interchange that is Exits 44 and 45 comes in. Exit 44 serves the Sagtikos State Parkway and exit 45 serves the Sunken Meadow State Parkway, which share the same right-of-way. Now in the town of Smithtown, the Northern State enters the hamlet of Commack. Through Commack, the parkway becomes a divided four-lane roadway once again, entering exit 46 eastbound, which connects to New Highway via a service road.

After exit 46, the Northern State Parkway bends northeast, crossing through Mayfair and east of Hoyt Farm Park. The parkway soon crosses under New Highway in Commack, before entering a large interchange with New York State Route 347 and New York State Route 454 (Veterans Memorial Highway). This unnumbered interchange serves as the eastern terminus of the Northern State Parkway, whose northbound lanes merge into NY 347/NY 454 east.

== History ==
=== Design ===
==== Wheatley Hills opposition ====
Designs for the Long Island Parkway system were first brought up in 1925 by Long Island State Park Commission chairman Robert Moses. These designs included a new highway, designated as the "North Parkway"; this new highway was to be a scenic roadway through Wheatley Hills, which was congested during the holiday seasons. Almost immediately, several wealthy residents of the neighborhood wanted the parkway realigned out of their neighborhood. The residents suggested that the North Parkway would damage home values through the Wheatley Hills area, a more centered parkway, designated the "Middle Parkway" would be better to develop, since most of the right-of-way would be along "wasted lands". The new parkway would soon reach the North Shore and Smithtown and would eventually improve the land along it.

Although they opposed the project, the committee developed by Wheatley Hills admitted that local property owners should ignore the case for the good of the general public. On March 6, 1925, the State of New York approved that the land for parks and parkways would not require the consent of the State Land Board, which would help Moses and the commission get land and start clearing the opposition of Wheatley Hills. On May 8, the LISPC held a public announcement of the system for parkways through Long Island, including a Northern State Parkway, connecting from Nassau Boulevard, and the Southern State Parkway, a new parkway from Central Avenue in Valley Stream. Both roads would have 160 feet (49 m) right-of-way. The decision to expand the system was brought up by Governor Alfred E. Smith; the roads coming out of Queens are not capable of handling traffic from New York City.

The right-of-way would be bought by Nassau County authorities and the state disapproved the "Middle Parkway" proposal that would bypass Wheatley Hills. The middle alignment would be much more expensive and cross through several larger settlements through the county. Grade crossings could not be eliminated either in design of the new parkway and in general the proposed alignment was not feasible. The route preferred would parallel the former Long Island Motor Parkway through western Nassau County, which turned south near East Williston. The parkway would start paralleling the Motor Parkway again in Suffolk County as the route approached Hauppauge. However, the problems with Wheatley Hills persisted into May 1925, with the Regional Plan Association getting involved in the debates. Smith and the LISPC toured the right-of-way to inspect the new alignment through Wheatley Hills – along with an estate in East Islip that would affect the Northern State; the case had already been brought to courts to prevent the LISPC from taking the estate. Smith stated that the opponents of the new highway should prove to have a serious argument. While Wheatley Hills opposed the project, it was admitted that they had offered to give land for use. An editorial written in the New York Times stated that the circular route that the Northern State Parkway would bring would be stronger in handling traffic than the Middle Parkway.

In June 1925, Smith corresponded with Henry Earle, a resident of Wheatley Hills with whom there were parkway-related disputes. Smith responded to the letter and submitted it to the New York Times that detailed that he was happy to hear that some of the objectors in the region were beginning to lighten their view on the Northern State Parkway. Smith outlined that he supported the designs made by the LISPC and engineers. Smith mentioned he did not know who recently stated that the Wheatley Hills residents were going to be taught a "lesson" by the state and mentioned that no one had done so. Smith continued to show his support for the looped parkway system developed for Long Island and that having only one parkway (the Middle Island Parkway) would not be advantageous towards the goal. Earle mentioned in his letter than one cannot see the Atlantic Ocean and the Long Island Sound could not be seen from the proposed alignment and Smith responded that the Manetto Hills would go to High Hill, where magnificent views of the water could be seen. Earle also argued that the new parkway would destroy property values throughout Wheatley Hills – despite evidence supporting Smith's claims to the contrary. Smith also took a case with the parkway crossing through 'uninteresting farmland" that would be destroyed: if the land does not exist according to Earle, Smith questioned what would be destroyed. The final argument pertained to whether Smith was selfish in the parkway's design – a claim which had been refuted by arguing that the new parkway had help from many Nassau County residents, and that those opposed to the parkway were overreacting. Smith completed the letter that he would forward the info to the LISPC that some residents were ready to cooperate.

==== Political opposition ====
In August 1928, Smith, now running for President of the United States, attacked Republican Party leaders in the New York State Legislature for being "ignorant" and for obstructing "every single park and parkway project on Long Island since 1924". Senator Charles Hewitt and Assemblyman Eberly Hutchinson – both the financial chairs for their respective congressional departments – would not allow $50,000 (1928 USD) for surveys of the Northern State Parkway (for a cost of $15,000) or for purchasing the right-of-way (for a cost of $35,000). Smith argued that by withholding the $50,000, the state would lose valuable options of land for the roadway already acquired and ones proposed to be acquired. Smith instead hoped that locals would help pay for the surveys, similar to August Heckscher saving Deer Range State Park and that people would come forward.

Despite running for president, Smith refused to leave without starting the skeleton of a new park and parkway system for Long Island and making sure that the needed land would be in the state's possession. Smith continued attacking the politicians, charging that they were on Wheatley Hills' side and pledged to keep the parkway out of their neighborhood – although he also argued that the sentiment had changed in Wheatley Hills, and that most of its residents supported the project. However, Hewitt and Hutchinson still refused to permit the expenditures, as they did not want to touch any funds until the Southern State Parkway was completed. Smith denied that the agreement ever took place; the funds that was supposed to be used were from unappropriated state land in New York City. The money for purchasing land would go to either those who agreed with the LISPC on prices – or those who could not afford to give away the land.

Smith argued that Hutchison had approved to make the $50,000 expenditure, but wanted to talk to Hewitt first in July 1928. Hewitt stated that the entire parkway would cost $50 million (1928 USD). Smith dismissed Hewitt's statements, explaining that the parkway's construction would be spread out over a period of at least six years – with the first segment costing $5 million. Smith labeled the reasonings given by the Hutchinson and Hewitt as "absurd" – although Smith admitted to saying that no funds would be requested until the Southern State Parkway and the causeway to Jones Beach State Park were completed. Smith said that the money would have been requested that year, had Albany not made it harder to extend the Southern State Parkway to Wantagh by reducing those project's funds.

The following day, Hewitt and Hutchinson responded to Smith's attacks, calling them "unqualified falsehoods". Both men accused Smith of using this to divert attention from his struggling campaign against Herbert Hoover. Both Hewitt and Hutchinson determined that they refuse to meet ground with Smith, and that they would not make effort to contact Smith. Hutchinson accused Smith of only having one sentence that was true in his rant. Hutchinson also denied that he and Hewitt were obstructors in the park program for Long Island. Hewitt responded that the $50 million statement was untrue and both stated that Smith was trying to rush them into supporting the money.

==== Continued arguments ====
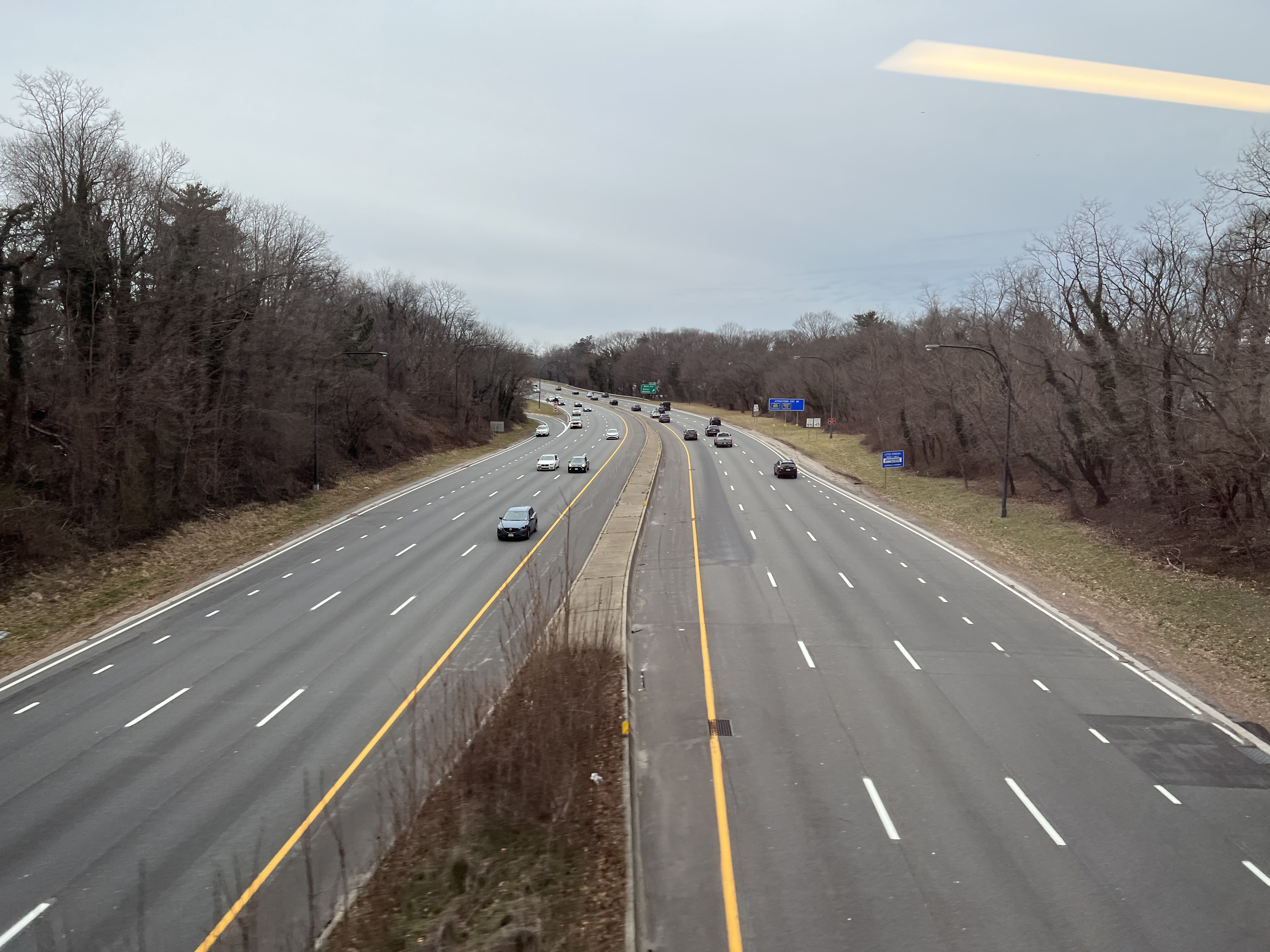
The Northern State Parkway in Roslyn Heights, as seen in 2023

Meanwhile, Robert Moses continued hawking the design of the Long Island parkway system and the benefits that these new parkways would bring about for residents. The Northern State Parkway, which would run 25 miles (40 km) from Nassau Boulevard to the Sagtikos Manor Parkway in Dix Hills, had most of its land obtained by August 26, 1928, and by the time, only gaps in the right-of-way acquisition had existed in Westbury and in Jericho.

In March 1929, it was reported by the LISPC that more than 60% of the right-of-way needed for the Northern State Parkway and its spur parkway to the Southern State were acquired. All this land had been given by gifts of individual residents that totaled in 15 miles (24 km) of right-of-way and 235 acres (95 ha) of land for the parkway. By that point, the opposition for the new parkway remained only in Wheatley Hills and the committee formed in 1925 to get the parkway moved out of Wheatley Hills was still affecting the process of acquiring the needed land. The Northern State Parkway would choose the best route without any prejudices. Moses also told the supervisor of the town of Oyster Bay that Wheatley Hills estates were assessed to cost $1,000 per acre (1929 USD) and land near Hempstead were doubled that over Wheatley Hills. The supervisor told the New York Times that they assessments were "grossly unfair" and "ridiculously low" compared to the estates within the same town, who were supporting giving land to the state. Major William Kennedy, who had recently toured the route of the entire proposed system, spoke to the New York Times that same month, regarding the opposition in Wheatley Hills. He argued that the residents of Wheatley Hills were overlooking the fact that New York City had brought the traffic to the area, with construction of the Union Turnpike and the Grand Central Parkway – two projects which established direct vehicular access to Wheatley Hills from points west. Kennedy stated only the city line cuts off the parkways from the same high ridges that would be involved. Kennedy went on to say that the Wheatley Hills opposed based on the idea that they would be opened to the state for automobile traffic.

Even into 1929, the residents of Wheatley Hills wanted the parkway's alignment to be 5 miles (8.0 km) south – but the public had shown preference for the northern alignment, and the LISPC would not back down from using it. Kennedy stated that the residents of eastern Nassau and western Suffolk Counties were more in-favor of building the parkway using the designed route than those in the Wheatley Hills. He also stated that the cost of the project would be between $5 million and $6 million, and that it would protect the area's landscape while also eliminating all grade crossings.

In early April 1929, the newly elected governor, Franklin Delano Roosevelt, supported the Long Island State Park Commission over the Wheatley Hills residents, who were represented now by attorney Grenville Clark. Clark stated that only 53.5% of the right-of-way for the Northern State Parkway had been acquired – not the 60% originally reported by the LISPC. Some local sources insisted that 80% right-of-way had been acquired, but this was deemed erroneous. Clark further argued that there had been misleading statements about the Wheatley Hills residents and their attitudes on the project. Roosevelt called Clark's April 9 statements as "misleading propaganda", and that the differing numbers were too small for Clark to effectively use for an argument. Roosevelt also stated that he had experience in acquiring rights-of-way, calling it a difficult procedure, and that it was extraordinary that so much land was acquired for the project despite the heavy opposition.

Roosevelt called the accusations of the LISPC issuing misleading propaganda as "absurd", arguing that controversies always arise when it comes to right-of-way acquisition. He also stated that it would be "simply absurd" to imagine that acres of land with high values would be taken without knowledge of who did what. Roosevelt further stated that the opposition outside of Wheatley Hills had evaporated so much, that local communities were even forwarding their own money to help buy land for the parkway.

==== Solutions ====
In May 1929, the remaining opposition in Nassau County (Wheatley Hills) released a statement, stating that the Nassau County Citizens Committee had been organized to cooperate with the Town of Oyster Bay, Nassau County, and New York for the development of the county; the committee also stated that it would oppose any projects which would damage part of the county. The NCCC announced that they would fight the Northern State Parkway alignment, due to it being "uneconomic, unnecessarily destructive and contrary to the public interest." The committee also stated that the LISPC had given propaganda overstating the amount of land acquired, and that less than 20% of it was in Nassau County. The disputed documents also stated that the majority of landowners in Nassau County actually supported the project, which they claimed was false. On June 9, the committee hired C. F. Stewart, of Woodmere, as its executive secretary, to help fight the project and help design other civic activities.

Behind the scenes, Clark had discovered that Moses had made a deal with Otto Hermann Kahn to realign the Northern State Parkway around his private golf course. Clark forwarded his discovery to Hutchinson and Hewitt, who in turn, demanded the payment sources for all purchases of private property. They also requested the information if any alignment was to cross through the route of a donor and was it changed after the gift. Moses denied the accusations made by Hewitt and Hutchinson, but soon admitted to Roosevelt that he had accepted $10,000 (1929 USD) to shift the route but said the shift was to satisfy the objections of local landowners who refused to accept the alignment in Dix Hills. Roosevelt originally wanted to support the alignment through Wheatley Hills, but once Clark threatened to expose the disclosure to the public, he relented. On October 23, 1929, Clark told Roosevelt that the citizens were sick of Moses, who they claimed "refused to compromise" and was "highly insulting". Roosevelt wasted no time coming up with a compromise to make the route have an abrupt turn at Glen Cove Road in Wheatley Hills.

In November 1929, the NCCC met at the Harvard Club and adopted unanimous resolutions to criticize Robert Moses for "unfounded assertions" that he misrepresented the attitude of the NCCC. The board also approved a plan sent in July to convert the Long Island Motor Parkway into a state parkway. The NCCC officially preferred using the Motor parkway over the Northern State Parkway alignment. The Motor Parkway, at 100 feet (30 m) wide and heading for 45 miles (72 km) from Queens to Lake Ronkonkoma, was argued to be a viable alternative which would eliminate the need to acquire more right-of-way for the new parkway. Rather than get the project involved in further politics, the NCCC preferred getting a solution based on expert opinion. Robert Moses sent a letter to Ernest Buckland explaining why the LISPC had done so much for the South Shore of Long Island and not enough for the North Shore. Moses accused the residents of Wheatley Hills – and now the residents of West Hills – of blocking a new parkway through the North Shore. The letter, however, made no reference to accusations made by the NCCC and it was questioned if Moses had heard about it. Moses stated that there had never been more opposition against a single project since 1924, and he denounced the NCCC and its views to prevent and/or postpone all state development in northern Nassau County. Moses backed his right-of-way choice, stating that the Motor Parkway would have no value for state parkway design, being too narrow and poorly constructed through the center of Nassau County; he decried the idea as a "ridiculous suggestion" and argued that it would funnel all the traffic towards the center of the island.

Moses argued that traffic congestion in northern Nassau County required urgent efforts to get a parkway built and to get other roads widened. He decried that the traffic would not go through the southern or central parts of the county, but would use local roads instead, such as the North Hempstead Turnpike – the North Shore's only west–east artery. Compared to the southern half of the county, where four arteries were being widened or constructed, the LISPC was not to blame for these problems, but the estate owners in Wheatley Hills and the local politicians representing them over the general public.

===== 1929 compromise =====
In December 1929, Moses and Clark reached an agreement with Smith to solve the property questions for the residents of Wheatley Hills. Smith, August Heckscher, and Henry Winthrop acted as counselors in settling the dispute. The settlement saw the Northern State Parkway's alignment be moved south to appease the Wheatley Hills residents. The LISPC would give $175,000 for property acquisition, while Heckscher gave $25,000 and Nassau County gave $700,000. The original parkway would have a minimum width of 160 feet (49 m), but the deal widened that to 250 feet (76 m). It was also announced that Governor Roosevelt had approved the change and that the rest of the alignment across Long Island would remain the same as originally proposed in 1925. This agreement ended the four-year fight with the residents of Wheatley Hills, West Hills, and Old Westbury who were objected to the original alignment.

While the compromise was a success for the residents of Wheatley Hills, according to Robert Caro in The Power Broker, the $175,000 was a smokescreen for the fact that the land purchasing would cost $2.25 million (1929 USD) and rather than the locals, the taxpayers would be stuck with the majority (over 90%) of the bill from the acquisition. The $175,000 also was claimed by Moses to have been spending for the entire cost of the detour, rather than the land acquisition. Caro goes on to explain that the accommodations made for the citizens of Wheatley Hills denied Long Islanders some of the parks on the North Shore that had been proposed by Moses, pardoning Caumsett State Park. Caro also explained that along with the $10,000 bribe that Moses had accepted, the illegal purchases of the Taylor Estate would turn him into a beating stick for the politicians of New York to get him to stop fighting.

=== Funding and construction ===
==== First segment ====
In March 1931, over a year removed from the Wheatley Hills debacle, Moses announced the start of the Northern State Parkway's construction in Nassau County. The groundbreaking ceremony for this segment was held on March 9, with Moses at the controls of a steam shovel on Nicholas Brady's estate in North Hills. The project saw a small segment be constructed from the New York City line – where it would eventually meet the Grand Central Parkway – and east to Searington Road and Willis Avenue. Five bridges would be constructed in the original contract: Willis Avenue in Roslyn Heights, Searington Road & Shelter Rock Road in North Hills, and the Long Island Motor Parkway & Lakeville Road in Lake Success. This first project cost roughly $350,000 (1931 USD).

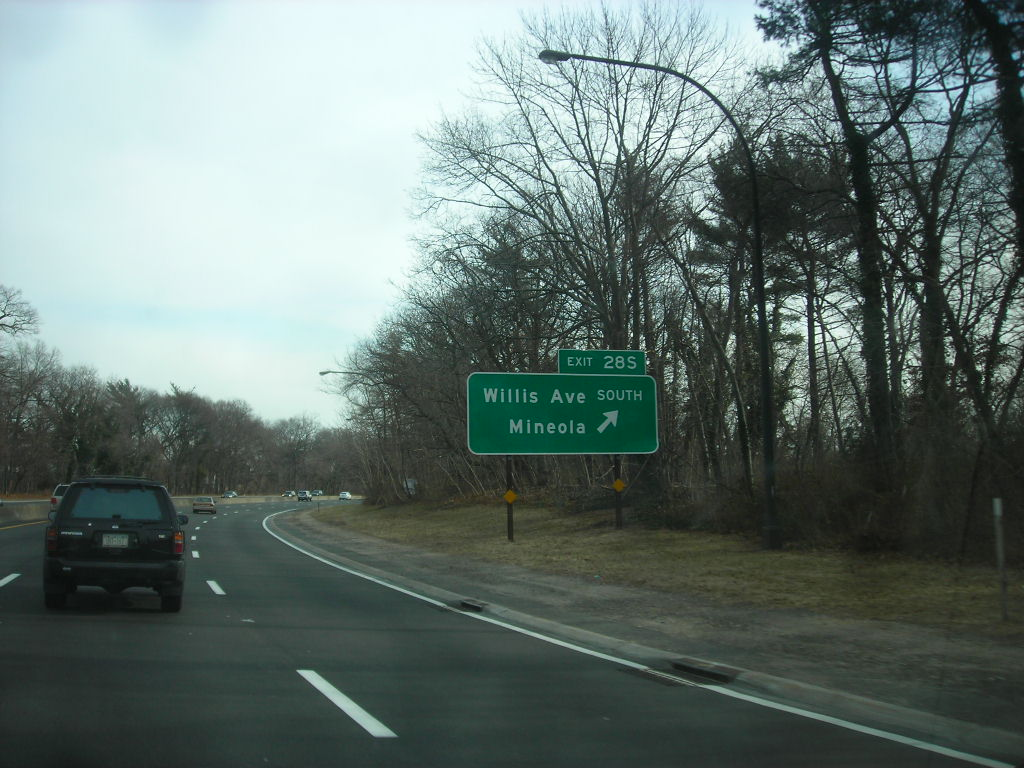
Exit 28 in Roslyn Heights – the original eastern terminus of the Northern State Parkway

On June 6, New York City voted to approve the beginning of construction of the Grand Central Parkway, which would connect from the Interborough Parkway to the Northern State at Lake Success. Construction of the project would begin in 1932 with paving and landscaping. Governor Roosevelt announced on July 22 that he would come to the site where the Northern State and the Grand Central would eventually meet and lay a new cornerstone to mark the spot on July 26. The governor, who was touring throughout Nassau and Suffolk County, called the project a significant upgrade to provide the city with proper traffic outlets. Roosevelt laid mortar on the previously placed cornerstone, while Robert Moses announced that state aid would be requested. The day prior, the contract for grading of the new parkway from the city line to Lakeville Road – along with the construction of the Long Island Motor Parkway and Lakeville Road bridges – was awarded. The LISPC requested over $5.5 million in funds for the projects to be completed in 1932. All the land for it had been accepted to the commission, and a majority of the money went to paying for the Northern State Parkway.

In January 1932, the budget submitted by Roosevelt would start moving money towards fast tracking construction of parkways on Long Island, as the Westchester parkway system was in full force. $1.08 million was appropriated for the Northern State Parkway construction along with $92,000 for landscaping work out of the $9.5 million requested for Long Island in total. However, in February, the state legislature cut down the amount of money on the budget that Roosevelt had submitted. Instead of the $1.08 million, which was cut from the budget, $200,000 was instead given to the Grand Central Parkway. Roosevelt slammed the decision by the Republican leaders in the Legislature as a "cleverly disguised salary reduction program." The cuts also included $15,000,000 for parkways and highways, which would break an agreement in 1929 that would go to the construction of facilities for motorists. In response, Moses and the LISPC went and applied for federal grants on July 18 to pay for the Northern State, along with other projects slashed in the budget. $1 million was requested to pave both the Grand Central and Northern State.

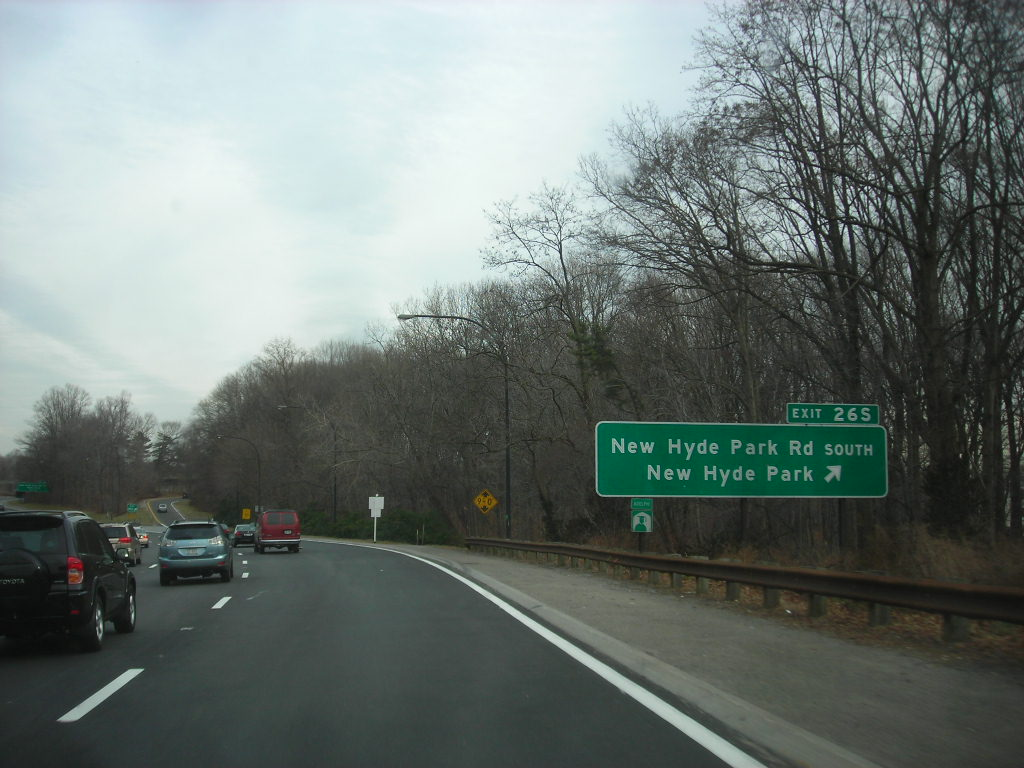
The Northern State Parkway at exit 26S in Lake Success – a portion of the original, 1933 highway segment

Two weeks after Moses requested the money, it was approved by the Federal government to get $1.5 million (1932 USD) to pave the Grand Central and Northern State, the latter of which had been constructed from the Queens line to Willis Avenue. It was also stated that Moses hoped the construction projects would be finished by January 1, 1933, rather than the 1932 completion date for the Northern State originally proposed.

On July 8, 1933, the state of New York announced that the Grand Central Parkway from Queens Boulevard in Kew Gardens to the city line and the Northern State Parkway up to Willis Avenue in Roslyn Heights would be opened to traffic on July 15. The new parkways, both 44 feet (13 m) wide, would have twenty access points along the alignment with a system of frontage roads to benefit access. The LISPC stated that the new roadway would be able to handle three and half times the amount of traffic that local roads could handle and would find it much easier to get to the North Shore. The new governor of New York, Herbert Lehman would open the new project and it cost the LISPC $6 million, including $3 million on land acquisition for the Grand Central.

Governor Lehman opened the alignments at the entrance to the Grand Central Parkway in Kew Gardens. When completed with the speech, Lehman removed the flagpole that had blocked entrance to the roadway in front of 2,000 people, including 500 guests from the LISPC. Flags were raised and the Star-Spangled Banner was played by a band. Lehman noted that this is the end of isolation for Long Island, but concerned if the city could afford maintenance as control of the Grand Central would be turned over from the LISPC to the city. The governor and state officials moved out to Mineola after the ceremony, where Lehman headed off for Albany, the rest went for a dinner. However, the first segment of the Northern State was opened, nine years after first proposed.

==== Extension to Wantagh State Parkway ====
In October 1933, shortly after the Northern State Parkway was completed from the Grand Central Parkway at the Queens–Nassau border to Willis Avenue in Roslyn Heights, Moses announced the contracts for an extension. This new extension would bring the Northern State from Willis Avenue out to Jericho Turnpike (NY 25) in Old Westbury. The new alignment was constructed rapidly, with the project being finished in August 1934. The new 3 miles (4.8 km) extension of the parkway cost $748,000 (1934 USD) and expected to relieve congestion along the Jericho Turnpike. Brand new interchanges were built at Roslyn Road in Albertson, I.U. Willets Road and Guinea Woods/Glen Cove Road in Carle Place and Old Westbury, while new stone faced bridges were constructed over the Oyster Bay Branch of the Long Island Rail Road, Roslyn Road, Albertson Station Road, Hillside Avenue, and the Jericho Turnpike. The new alignment, like the original piece, was also 250 feet (76 m) wide with its right-of-way, and built with four lanes of concrete.

The ceremony to open the new extension would be held on August 29, 1934, with a ceremony led by Moses, who would cut a ribbon crossed at the Roslyn Road interchange. Moses – along with Nassau County Supervisor J. Russell Sprague and State Highway Commissioner Arthur Brandt – would speak, following a meeting of the State Council of Parks at the Queens line. The ceremony would be held at 2:30 pm with less of a fanfare than the previous opening of the first segment. 500 people were present at the ceremony, including representatives from the State Council of Parks, the LISPC, along with Nassau County and New York City officials. Brandt's wife held the scissors that cut the ribbon blocking entrance to the new roadway. The announcement was mentioned that the right-of-way for an extension out to Commack. After the ceremony, officials went to dinner and then inspected work on the Meadowbrook Causeway, which was in construction at the time.

In August 1936, Moses and the LISPC announced the extension of the Northern State Parkway, along with a new north–south parkway to connect the two west–east parkways on Long Island. Moses stated, with money being requested that would cost $2 million (1936 USD) that Moses would request next year. In January 1937, the money was requested by the LISPC at the Nassau County Board of Supervisors. The county would supervise the acquisition of land for the new roadways, but the state of New York would handle paying for construction and maintenance of the new road. The new pieces of road, unlike the rest of the Northern State, would be 200 feet (61 m) wide, rather than the 250 feet (76 m) on the previous portions. It was expected in request that contracts for the new road could be announced in April.

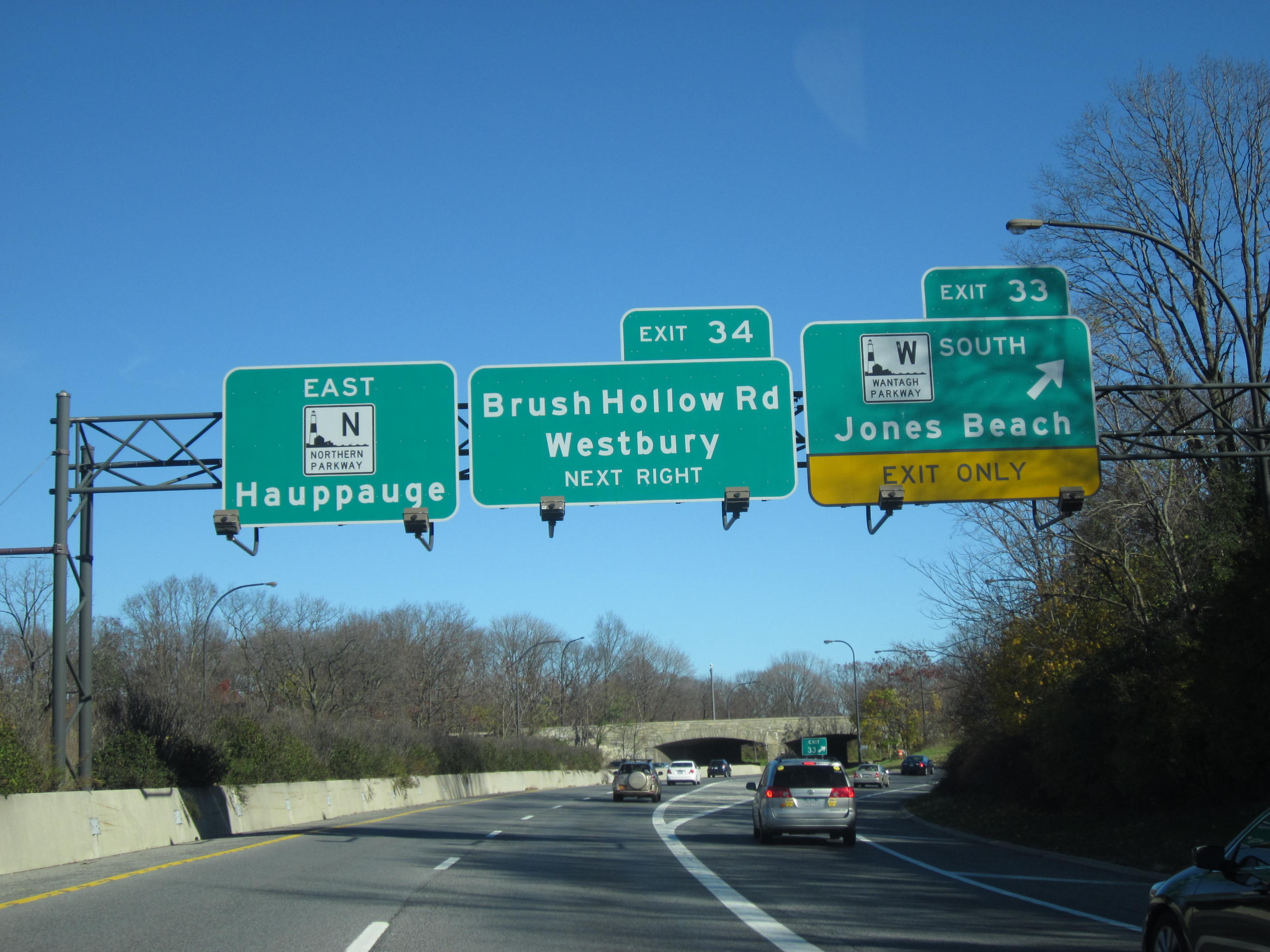
The Northern State Parkway eastbound at the junction with the Wantagh State Parkway at exit 33

In February 1937, the LISPC announced the design of the extension of the Northern State Parkway along with an extension of the Wantagh State Parkway. This new 9.5 miles (15.3 km) set of roadway, designated the "Northern–Wantagh State Parkway Extension", would extend the Wantagh from the Southern State to the Northern State and the Northern State to the interchange with the Wantagh in Wheatley Hills. The plans for the new road would be opened by 1939 so drivers would have easier access to Jones Beach State Park from the 1939 World's Fair at Flushing, Queens. The new roadways would have eighteen stone faced bridges combined between sections, with construction beginning in 1937. The new project would start being landscaped and paved by 1938. On April 7, the LISPC announced that bids on the new extensions would open on April 20 for the new project with the expectation that all at-grade structures would be completed by the end of the year.

On November 20, 1938, the LISPC announced at their headquarters in Babylon that the extension of the Northern State would open to traffic a month later. Although originally at the cost of $2 million in 1936–7, by the time the road would be completed, the cost would come at $4.4 million (1938 USD). However, the new roadway was three months ahead of its slated 1939 completion date. The new roadway would be opened on December 17, with attendance by Governor Lehman, Sprague, Brandt and Moses. It was also announced that the differences in the Northern State alignment also included use of asphalt over concrete and had a 9 feet (2.7 m) median. The new parkway extension would connect Carle Place, Old Westbury, Westbury, Hicksville, Farmingdale, and Hempstead to the city via the parkway system. Six new interchanges were also constructed, including more of the Glen Cove Road interchange.

The ceremony was held on December 17, with attendance of Moses and company, along with Alfred Smith. 300 cars were lined up on the asphalt, which was designed to make night driving much easier over the concrete. Smith cut the ribbon on the new extension in Westbury, about 500 yards (460 m) east of Glen Cove Road. A tour of the new parkway extensions was held, but not over the entire thing. The group went from Westbury along the new alignment of the Northern State, and south on the Wantagh to the Southern State. New lights were installed on the median of the parkways to help with lighting of the parkway. Before a luncheon for the officials, over 600 people were presented the new parkways. The new parkway opened to traffic, connecting drivers to various places along Long Island and New York City.

==== Extensions to the Sagtikos State Parkway ====
With the Northern State Parkway now constructed up to Union Avenue in Westbury, the plans of the LISPC shifted towards extending the highway into Suffolk County. In late July 1940, the State Council of Parks approved $30 million out of $60 million for grade crossing eliminations, which included getting the Northern State from Union Avenue to the "Huntington–Amityville Highway" (current-day NY 110). However, by January 1941, the money had not yet been approved by the Legislature, which caused controversy over whether the money should be allotted. In late 1940, an amendment to the New York State Constitution had been passed so that the money could be shifted for use in parkway construction. Party lines had not formed yet in terms of opposing it, although Moses was appealing to the Republicans in the Legislature to get the money passed, which included $5.5 million to the Northern State extension.

In April 1941, Governor Lehman passed the bill that would transfer the $30 million from the unspent grade crossing funds to the construction of parkways through Long Island and Westchester. The money was set aside for construction of the Northern State extension, which was advertised to benefit traffic on the North Hempstead Turnpike (NY 25A) and the Jericho Turnpike, as well as bring several central Long Island municipalities into the parkway system. The new, 9.5-mile (15.3 km) extension would end at NY 110, less than a mile from the birthplace of poet Walt Whitman.

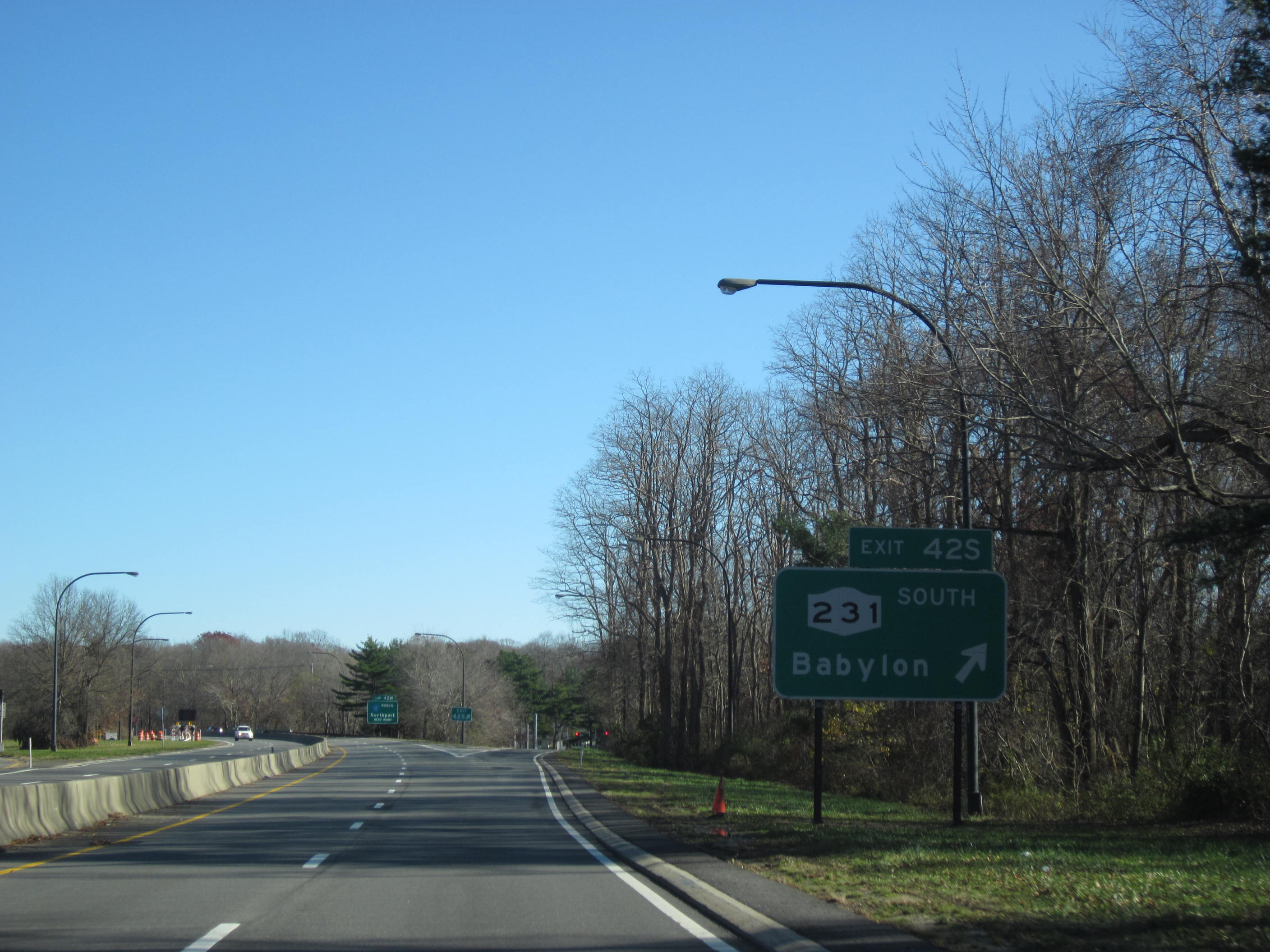
The Northern State Parkway at exit 42S – the northern terminus of NY 231

While funds were ready for the new extension in 1941, construction of the new extension did not begin until after World War II, with extra money coming to the project in 1946 courtesy of the Post-War Reconstruction Fund. $22,067,590 (1946 USD) was approved for use by the LISPC, with over $19 million going to state parkway construction on the island. Some of the money was sent to construct the Captree State Parkway, while $4.175 million was sent to construct the extension of the Northern State Parkway out to NY 110 along with extra money for some dividers on the parkway. By the time money was announced, construction had begun on the Northern State. By April 1946, it was announced that another 4 miles (6.4 km) extension from NY 110 to Deer Park Avenue (CR 35) had been approved, bumping the total project up to $6.225 million.

In November 1947, the New York State Department of Public Works announced that bids were closed on paving the 5 miles (8.0 km) section of the Northern State from Union Avenue to Plainview Road. The MacAsphalt Company won the job, posting a low bid of $1,066,954 (1947 USD). By that point, thirteen bridges on the new Northern State alignment had been approaching completion and grading had finished. In December 1948, construction was announced on the piece of the Northern State between Plainview Road and Deer Park Avenue, with a proposed extension through Commack to the Sagtikos State Parkway and a spur road to Sunken Meadow State Park. The new contract was announced at a total of $1,372,538 (1948 USD) with a slated completion date of December 31, 1949.

In April 1949, it was announced that the first piece of the Northern State Parkway extension would open to commuter traffic on April 11, 1949. The section started in 1947, extending the road from Union Avenue to Plainview Road in the Woodbury area. Moses mentioned in a public statement that the entire alignment would open in the spring of 1950. Unlike the previous extensions, this one would not have a public ceremony. That December 19, another extension opened – again without public fanfare – from Plainview Road to NY 110, bringing it into Suffolk County; the cost of this extension totaled $3 million (1949 USD).

Following the opening of the segment to NY 110, Moses announced that the next segment of the Northern State Parkway – an extension from NY 110 to Deer Park Avenue (NY 231) – would open within the following 90 days. The extension to Deer Park Avenue opened to traffic on May 22, 1950 – longer than Moses' 90-day promise. Moses called this segment of the Northern State "a far cry" from the original piece of parkway on Long Island – the Southern State's first section, which opened on November 6, 1927. It was also announced that contracts would begin soon for the parkway's next extension, between Deer Park Avenue and the Sagtikos State Parkway.

On March 28, 1950, the State of New York made appropriations to begin construction on the Sagtikos State Parkway, which would mark the eastern end of the Northern State Parkway in Commack, with the spur to Sunken Meadow State Park. At the same time, money was funded to upgrade the curbing in the median for both the Northern State and Southern State at the cost of $1.75 million (1950 USD). On October 4, 1950, the state awarded a contract to Hendrickson Brothers, Inc of Valley Stream to construct the Northern State extension from Deer Park Avenue to the point east of Commack Road that would mark the Sagtikos junction at the cost $1,343,707. Bids on the Sagtikos State Parkway paving were held on June 6, 1951, with the Hudson Contracting Corporation in Kew Gardens bidding $1,407,037 (1951 USD). The new parkway landscaping contract for both parkways was bid on July 12, 1951, along with paving the newly constructed section of the Northern State.

On September 29, 1952, the extension of the Northern State Parkway from Deer Park to Commack was completed and opened alongside the new Sagtikos State Parkway. In similar fashion to the other Northern State extensions east of Westbury, there was no ceremony or fanfare held for the opening of these new roads.

==== Changes since completion ====
Reconstruction began in 1950 on improving the right-of-way for the Northern State Parkway. This saw a new divider in the center median of the roadway, installed, along with improvement of service roads in the area. Work was competed in 1951.

In 1953, the LISPC widened the road to 3.5 feet (1.1 m) so the two lanes in each direction could go to 12 feet (3.7 m) wide for cars. The LISPC also overlaid the original concrete surface with asphalt. New shoulders were created for disabled vehicles, which would reduce accidents. Finally, the route was also 100% re-landscaped with the old trees torn out and new ones planted.

Although proposed in 1939 during opening of the Bethpage State Parkway, construction began in December 1953 on an extension of the Meadowbrook State Parkway north from the Southern State Parkway to the Northern State Parkway. This new parkway would become a traffic reliever for north–south roads through Nassau County, including a new interchange in Westbury that would mark the northern terminus of the Meadowbrook. The $10 million (1956 USD) project was completed in 1956, with the parkway being opened to traffic on October 13, 1956, with a ceremony attended by the new governor, W. Averell Harriman, along with Moses and Edward Larkin, the supervisor for the town of Hempstead. All three spoke on behalf of their entities, and after, traveled the new alignment north to the Northern State and back south. The group then went to Roosevelt Field and was praised by William Zeckendorf in honor of completion of the extension.

Construction had already begun in the early 1950s on the Sunken Meadow State Parkway, another spur of the Northern State Parkway to Sunken Meadow State Park. Originally, this was one of the last three pieces of the Long Island parkway system originally proposed, with the Captree and the Heckscher State Parkways being constructed or proposed at the same time. On November 28, 1954, the first section of the new parkway was opened to traffic, opening the part from the Northern and Sagtikos State Parkways to NY 25. Construction also had begun on the extension to the park. On April 1, 1957, the new extension opened to traffic, pardoning the landscaping on the alignment north of NY 25. The $11 million (1957 USD) project was opened formally by Governor Harriman on June 21, 1957, after landscaping had been finished.

On April 11, 1962, the New York State Department of Public Works announced $410,679,000 (1962 USD) in money, a record at the time, to help fund projects throughout New York State, with $83.646 million going to the projects in Westchester, Nassau and Suffolk counties. Among the money is a project to create a spur to extend the Northern State Parkway from its terminus at the Sagtikos and Sunken Meadow State parkways to Veterans Highway (CR 76; future NY 454). In January 1965, Assemblyman Perry Duryea announced that New York's new governor, Nelson Rockefeller, set aside money in his state budget to fund LISPC programs. One of the projects included was the $12 million (1965 USD) extension. Also announced was a $7 million project to widen the original, 5-mile (8.0 km) segment of the Northern State Parkway, constructed in the 1930s, from the Queens–Nassau line to Westbury.

On June 9, 1965, the extension of the Northern State to Veterans Memorial Highway in Hauppauge opened to traffic, with the parkway's new eastern terminus being just northwest of the then-new Suffolk County government and police headquarters. The project cost $4 million and removed the automatic turns to the Sunken Meadow and Sagtikos.

The LISPC also announced in 1965 that a widening at the western end would start later in the year. On November 28, 1965, the LISPC announced widening of the congested sections of both the Grand Central and Northern State between the Clearview Expressway (I-295) and Old Westbury. While federal funding helped paid the Grand Central portion of the $20 million project, the $11.5 million for the Northern State came out of the New York State budget. The project would not cost any homes to be taken down, but would cost a lot of trees to be taken down along the roadway. The project would also reconstruct the interchange of the Clearview, Grand Central, and Hillside Avenue for a future extension of the Clearview to the Nassau Expressway. Robert Moses announced that the project would begin in Spring 1966. Construction of the widening project, however, did not being until 1967, with a cost that had ballooned to $16.7 million (1969 USD); the project saw the parkway be widened from four lanes to six as far east as Glen Cove Road. On January 2, 1969, the LISPC announced that the project would be completed later that year.

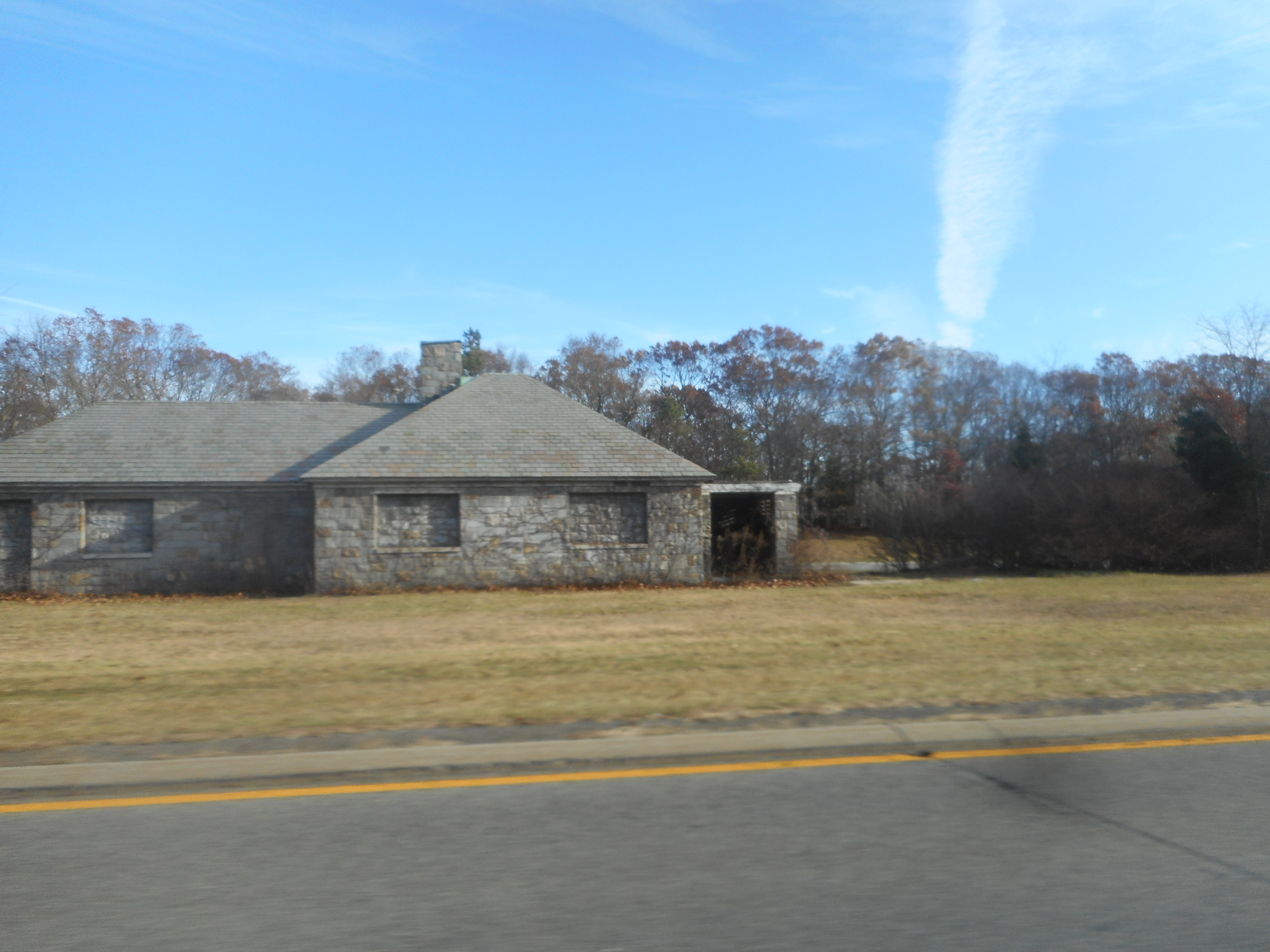
The former service station between Exits 42 and 43 in Commack, as seen in November 2019

While long after designing the Long Island parkway system, Robert Moses constructed multiple service stations along the Northern State Parkway. One was located east of the Meadowbrook State Parkway interchange (exit 31A) in Carle Place, which was closed in 1986. The second was located in Commack, located west of CR 4, which was abandoned in 1985. The Commack station, which still stands, was proposed in 1989 by the Huntington town historian Rufus Langhans to save the station, which was in danger of being demolished, suggesting the station be declared a town landmark and possibly be a welcome center for the Northern State Parkway. At the time, however, the New York State Department of Transportation was looking at all angles to what to do with the former gas stations.

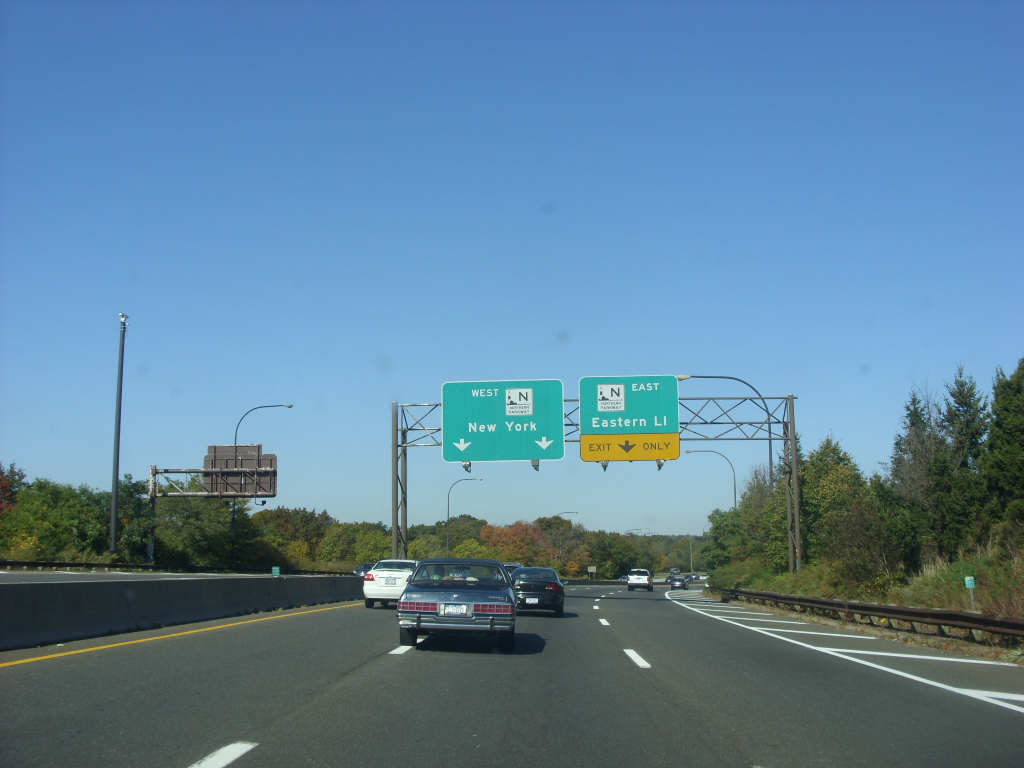
The Meadowbrook northbound approaching the interchange with the Northern State Parkway, scene of a lawsuit in 1989

In 1989, during a reconstruction project at the Westbury Interchange, a lawsuit was filed against NYSDOT by the Village of Westbury, regarding environmental impacts; the lawsuit claimed that NYSDOT did not follow proper environmental guidelines while designing the project because their environmental impact report failed to consider the impacts of a nearby future widening project on the Northern State Parkway. Construction began in May 1988, and the project was expected to be completed on October 31, 1991. It was proceeding on schedule until lawsuit was filed in February 1989. The Appellate Division of the New York State Supreme Court ruled on that NYSDOT had to provide a new environmental report by May 12 of that year or face having the reconstruction shut down. That December 19, the Court of Appeals announced their decision on the case of Village of Westbury v. Department of Transportation of the State of New York, et al., ruling in favor of Westbury. In its decision, the court stated NYSDOT should have issued a joint report for the interchange and widening projects because both projects improved the flow of traffic on the Northern State Parkway and were therefore related – although the widening portion of the project did not have a projected start date at the time the lawsuit was filed. The previous court's ruling was affirmed, and NYSDOT was advised to consider the environmental impacts of projects in the future on other, nearby projects. A settlement was eventually reached between NYSDOT and the Village of Westbury, allowing construction on the interchange to restart in February 1990; the reconstruction project was ultimately completed in 1991.

In 2011, the Northern State Parkway was ceremoniously designated by the State of New York as Purple Heart Way.

The interchange with New York State Route 110 was originally a split cloverleaf exit, signed as exit 40S for southbound NY 110 and exit 40N for the northbound direction. In 2011, reconstruction of the interchange began. The cloverleaf interchange has been replaced by a single exit 40 with longer acceleration lanes, and traffic lights on NY 110 to regulate on and off-ramp traffic. The original overpass carrying the parkway over NY 110 was replaced, reusing much of the old stonework of its predecessor. In addition, a third lane was added in each direction on NY 110 in order to reduce congestion in the area. The project was completed in late 2013.

In October 2018, work was competed that rebuilt the ramps at New York State Route 231 in an effort to increase safety.

In 2022, it was announced that a modernization project would be undertaken at the Westbury Interchange. The $3.8 million project would mitigate bottlenecks on Glen Cove Road and Jericho Turnpike. One such feature added as part of this project was a raised median barrier on Glen Cove Road to prevent illegal turns from being made. Construction was underway by December of that year, continuing into 2023. The project was completed in late December 2023.

In October 2023, a milling project began between the Meadowbrook and Wantagh Parkways. It was competed in May 2024.

With the eastern terminus of the Northern State currently at NY 347 and NY 454, proposals had existed in 1963 to extend the highway to the Wyandanch Preserve. This extension would extend the Northern State eastward through Smithtown to reach Caleb Smith State Park and an interchange with NY 25, near CR 108 (Old Willets Path). A new interchange would be constructed with the Veterans Memorial Highway, soon reaching NY 111 in Village of the Branch. The extension would turn southward near the NY 111 interchange, which would be located near Mount Pleasant Road. The new interchange would cross NY 347 (Neconset–Port Jefferson Highway) again. The new extension would continue south, crossing over CR 67 (the Long Island Motor Parkway) and entering a second interchange with the Long Island Expressway in the vicinity of exit 57 and exit 58. The highway would then continue south, crossing NY 454 a second time and passing a new entrance to Connetquot State Park, further south. The road would then continue south, reaching a new interchange with the Heckscher State Parkway located east of exit 43A. The Regional Plan Association and Suffolk County truncated these plans in the mid-1960s. This new proposal would eliminate the southern turn to the Heckscher, and instead, the county proposed that a new interchange would be constructed with NY 25 in the Village of the Branch, east of NY 111. However, the Regional Plan Association proposed that instead of NY 25, the new parkway would go 12 miles (19 km) further, terminating at the junction of NY 25 and NY 112 in Coram. However, during the 1970s, the New York State Department of Transportation did a study for the extension, but this was deemed unfeasible due to expansion of development in Suffolk County and the raised cost of acquiring land for rights-of-way.

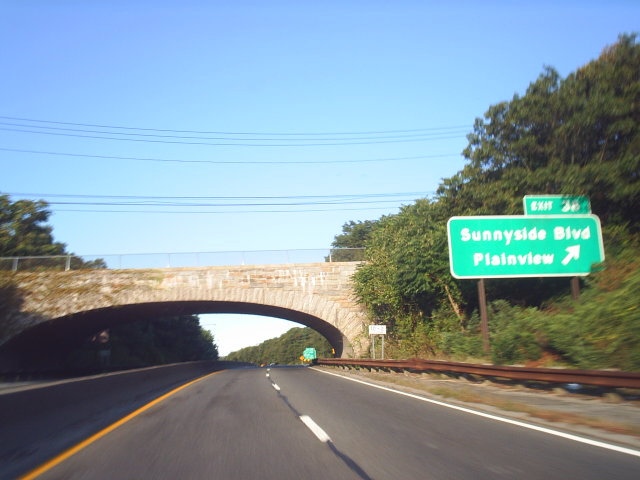
Exit 38, west of where the Bethpage and Caumsett state parkways were to meet

On May 20, 1961, the LISPC announced a new parkway would be constructed from the Northern State Parkway to Caumsett State Park on the North Shore of Long Island. This new parkway would be an extension of an extended Bethpage State Parkway, which would be brought from a traffic circle in Plainview to the Northern State, replacing a local two-lane road which connected drivers to the park. In 1965, the LISPC announced that the new roadway would be a four-lane access road (two lanes in each direction) that would be scenic and "well-landscaped". The parkway would also cross through Cold Spring Harbor and directly through the southern end of the village of Lloyd Harbor, at the cost of taking multiple homes in the area and a Standard Oil Company tank farm. In order to construct the new extension to the Caumsett, the Bethpage State Parkway would need to be extended north from its terminus in Plainview. The first new exit would become a new interchange with the Seaford–Oyster Bay Expressway, eliminating the traffic circle; a diamond interchange with Plainview Avenue and Bethpage State Park; a cloverleaf interchange with Old Country Road; a partial cloverleaf interchange with the Long Island Expressway (NY 495) along with a cloverleaf interchange with the Northern State Parkway. North of the Northern State, access points would be created at the junction with Jericho Turnpike (NY 25), and at the junction of NY 25A and NY 108 in Cold Spring Harbor. North of the NY 25A/NY 108 junction, the parkway would extend into Caumsett State Park and end at a traffic circle. The extension of the Bethpage Parkway was never constructed – although the proposal to extend it to the Northern State Parkway was revived in 1990. The Long Island Regional Planning Board proposed in February 1990 that the Bethpage Parkway be extended along with two other highways on Long Island, the Wantagh Parkway and the Seaford–Oyster Bay Expressway. The Bethpage would be extended northward to construct the connection to the Long Island Expressway and the Northern State Parkway, which would serve as a direct link between northeastern Nassau County and northwestern Suffolk County. The interchange with the Wantagh State Parkway would also be changed as the Board recommended that the parkway be extended northward to the Long Island Expressway from the Northern State, which serves as the northern end of the roadway. These projects were among the 30 new ideas proposed to expand Nassau County road capacity over the next 20 years, with $640 million (1990 USD).

== Exit list ==
Exit numbers continue sequentially from those of the Grand Central Parkway.

County	Location	mi	km	Exit	Destinations	Notes
Queens–Nassau county line	Little Neck–Lake Success line	0.00	0.00	–	Grand Central Parkway west – New York	Continuation west
Nassau	Lake Success	0.54	0.87	25	Lakeville Road – New Hyde Park, Great Neck	Signed as exits 25S (south) and 25N (north) westbound
Nassau	Lake Success	1.35	2.17	26	New Hyde Park Road – New Hyde Park, North Hills	Signed as exits 26S (south) and 26N (north)
Nassau	Searingtown	2.53	4.07	27	Shelter Rock Road – Searingtown, Manhasset	Signed as exits 27S (south) and 27N (north) eastbound
Nassau	Albertson–Roslyn Heights line	3.85	6.20	28	Willis Avenue – Roslyn, Mineola	Signed as exits 28S (south) and 28N (north) eastbound
Nassau	Roslyn Heights	4.40	7.08	29	Roslyn Road – East Hills, East Williston	
Nassau	Old Westbury	5.13	8.26	29A	I-495 west – New York	Westbound exit and eastbound entrance; exit 38 on I-495
Nassau	Old Westbury	5.60	9.01	30	I.U. Willets Road – Albertson, Old Westbury	Eastbound exit and entrance
Nassau	Old Westbury	6.20	9.98	31	Glen Cove Road – Glen Cove, Hempstead	Westbound exit only
Nassau	Carle Place	6.60	10.62	31	NY 25 / Glen Cove Road – Glen Cove, Hempstead	No westbound exit
Nassau	Carle Place	6.80– 7.10	10.94– 11.43	31A	NY 25 / Meadowbrook State Parkway south – Jones Beach	Access to NY 25 via Glen Cove Road; no eastbound access to NY 25; northern terminus of Meadowbrook State Parkway
Nassau	Westbury	8.65	13.92	32	Post Avenue – Westbury, Old Westbury	
Nassau	Westbury	9.77	15.72	33	Wantagh State Parkway south – Jones Beach	Northern terminus of Wantagh State Parkway
Nassau	Westbury	10.10	16.25	34	Brush Hollow Road – Westbury	
Nassau	Jericho	11.91	19.17	35	NY 106 / NY 107 – Hicksville, Oyster Bay	Signed as exits 35S (south) and 35N (north)
Nassau	Plainview	13.65	21.97	36	South Oyster Bay Road – Bethpage, Syosset	Signed as exits 36S (south) and 36N (north)
Nassau	Woodbury	14.53	23.38	36A	NY 135 – Seaford, Syosset	No westbound exit; signed as exits 36A (south) and 36B (north); exits 12E-W on NY 135
Nassau	Woodbury	14.92	24.01	37	Manetto Hill Road – Woodbury, Plainview	
Nassau	Woodbury	15.20	24.46	37A	I-495 to NY 135 – New York, Riverhead	Same-directional access only; no entrance ramps
Nassau	Woodbury	15.60	25.11	38	Sunnyside Boulevard – Plainview	
Suffolk	Melville	17.20	27.68	39	Round Swamp Road – Farmingdale	
Suffolk	Melville	18.38	29.58	40	NY 110 – Huntington, Amityville	
Suffolk	Dix Hills	21.04	33.86	41	Wolf Hill Road – Dix Hills, South Huntington	
Suffolk	Dix Hills	23.30– 23.80	37.50– 38.30	42	NY 231 south / CR 35 north (CR 66 north) – Babylon, Huntington, Northport	Signed as exits 42S (south) and 42N (north); northern terminus of NY 231; southern terminus of CR 35
Suffolk	Commack	26.38	42.45	43	CR 4 (Commack Road) / CR 67 – Commack	CR 67 not signed
Suffolk	Commack	26.56	42.74	44-45	Sagtikos State Parkway south / Sunken Meadow State Parkway north – South Shore, Kings Park	Signed as exits 44 (south) and 45 (north); exit SM1 on Sunken Meadow Parkway
Suffolk	Commack	26.68	42.94	46	New Highway	
Suffolk	Hauppauge	28.88	46.48	–	NY 347 east / NY 454 east – Hauppauge	Eastern terminus; western terminus of NY 347
1.000 mi = 1.609 km; 1.000 km = 0.621 mi: Incomplete access
