= East Williston Village Historic District =

Historic district in Nassau County, New York, United States

- U.S. National Register of Historic Places
- U.S. Historic district
- New York State Register of Historic Places
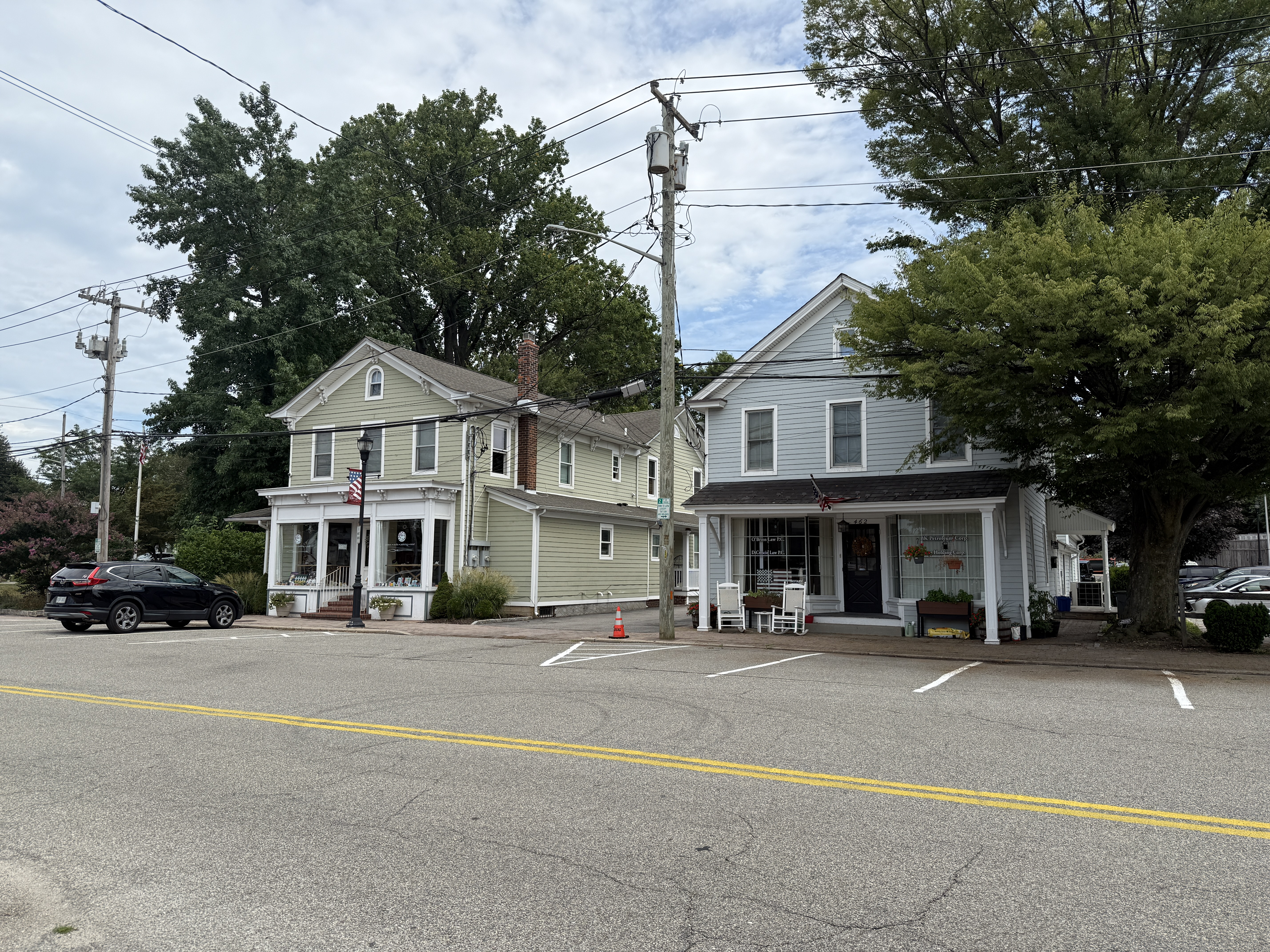
- Buildings in the East Williston Village Historic District in 2021

- Location within New York Location within the United States
- Location: Roughly bounded by E. Williston Ave., Roslyn Rd., Atlanta Ave. and Village Green, East Williston, New York
- Coordinates: 40°45′28″N 73°38′18″W
- Area: 7 acres (2.8 ha)
- Architect: Multiple
- Architectural style: Colonial Revival, Late Victorian, Gothic Revival
- NRHP reference No.: 85001603

Significant dates
- Added to NRHP: July 18, 1985
- Designated NYSRHP: May 24, 1985

The East Williston Village Historic District is a national historic district located in the Incorporated Village of East Williston, in Nassau County, New York.

== Description ==
It includes 26 contributing buildings and one contributing site. It encompasses the largely intact 19th and early 20th century residential and commercial core of the village. The earliest extant building is the Willis farmhouse, dated to the early 19th century. The district's commercial center is Station Plaza, located at the 19th century railroad station.

It was listed on both the New York State Register of Historic Places and the National Register of Historic Places in 1985.

== See also ==
- National Register of Historic Places listings in North Hempstead, New York
- Main Street Historic District (Roslyn, New York)
- Roslyn Village Historic District
- Southampton Village Historic District
