= New York State Route 25C =

Former state highway in New York State

New York State Route 25C
- NY 25C highlighted in red (Section renamed NY 900F backed in blue)

Route information
- Auxiliary route of NY 25
- Maintained by NYSDOT, NYCDOT, and Nassau County
- Length: 4.29 mi (6.90 km)
- Existed: mid-1930s–January 1, 1970

Major junctions
- West end: NY 25 in Queens Village
- Grand Central Parkway in Bellerose; Cross Island Parkway in Glen Oaks
- East end: NY 25B in New Hyde Park

Location
- Country: United States
- State: New York
- Counties: Queens, Nassau

Highway system
- New York Highways; Interstate; US; State; Reference; Parkways
← NY 25B	→ NY 25D

New York State Route 25C (NY 25C) was an east–west state highway on Long Island in New York in the United States. The route began in Queens at an intersection with NY 25 and paralleled NY 25B for just over 4 miles (6 km) before ending at a junction with NY 25B in western Nassau County. NY 25C was assigned in the 1930s and removed in 1970. Part of the route's former routing is still state-maintained as New York State Route 900F, an unsigned reference route.

== Route description ==
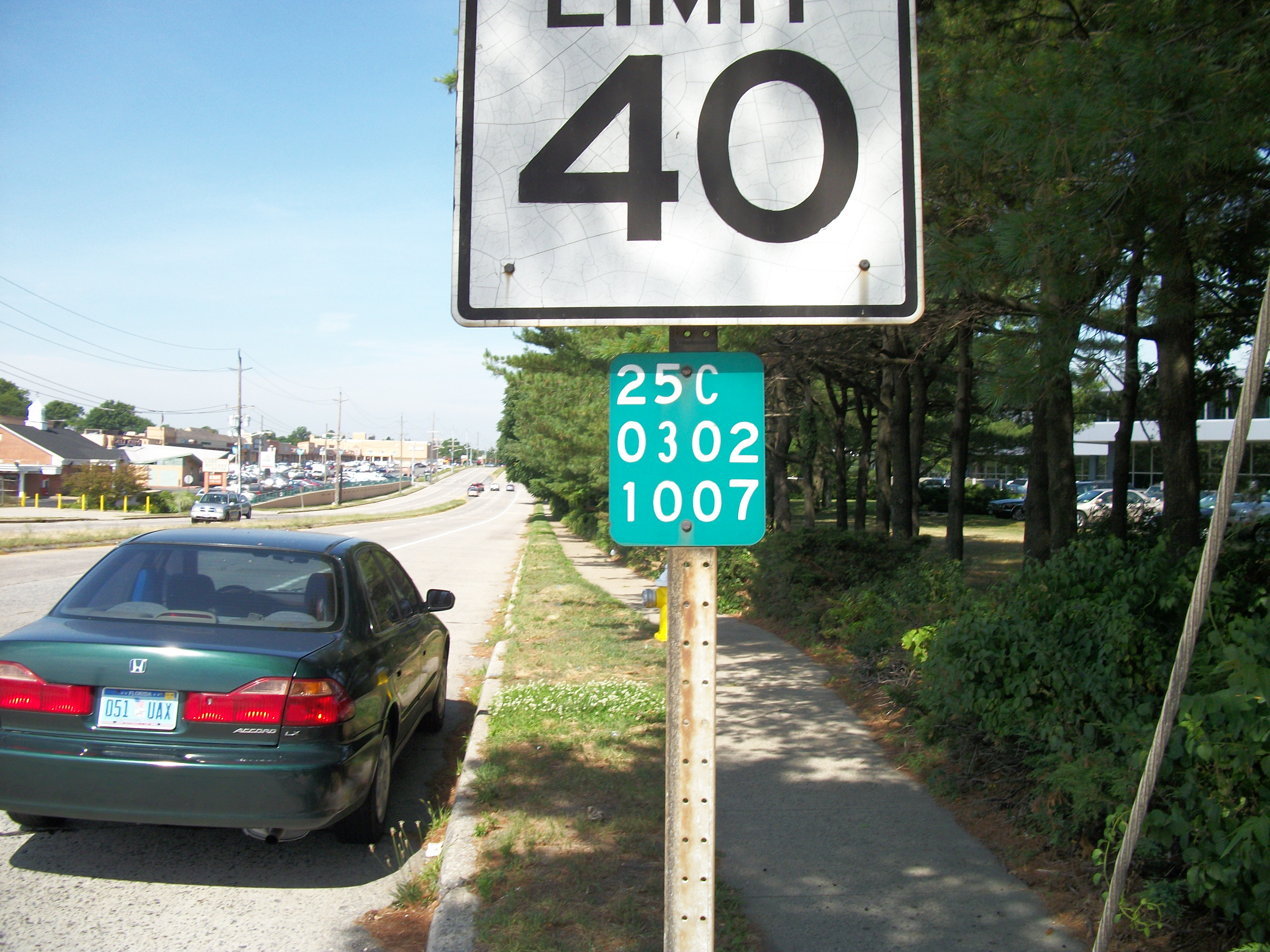
Reference marker along former NY 25C, now NY 900F, an unsigned reference route, in North New Hyde Park

NY 25C began at the intersection of Springfield Boulevard and Union Turnpike in the Queens neighborhood of Queens Village. Here, the route connected to NY 25, which entered from the west on Union Turnpike and left to the south on Springfield Boulevard. The route headed to the northeast along the southern edge of the Oakland Gardens neighborhood on the four-lane Union Turnpike, a road often recognized more by its name than by its designation. In its first few blocks, the road passed Alley Pond Park and connected to the Grand Central Parkway by way of an interchange. The route continued on, meeting the nearby Cross Island Parkway at another interchange before heading into the Glen Oaks portion of Queens.

The highway continued on a northeasterly track to the New York City line, where it turned slightly eastward as it crossed into Nassau County. Now in the town of North Hempstead, NY 25C continued to follow Union Turnpike along the northern edge of North New Hyde Park to an intersection with Marcus Avenue. While Union Turnpike ends here, the route continued eastward along the two-lane Marcus Avenue toward Herricks. After several blocks, the road turned southeast to reach Hillside Manor, a neighborhood located on the border between North New Hyde Park and Herricks. NY 25C ended here at a junction with NY 25B (Hillside Avenue).

== History ==
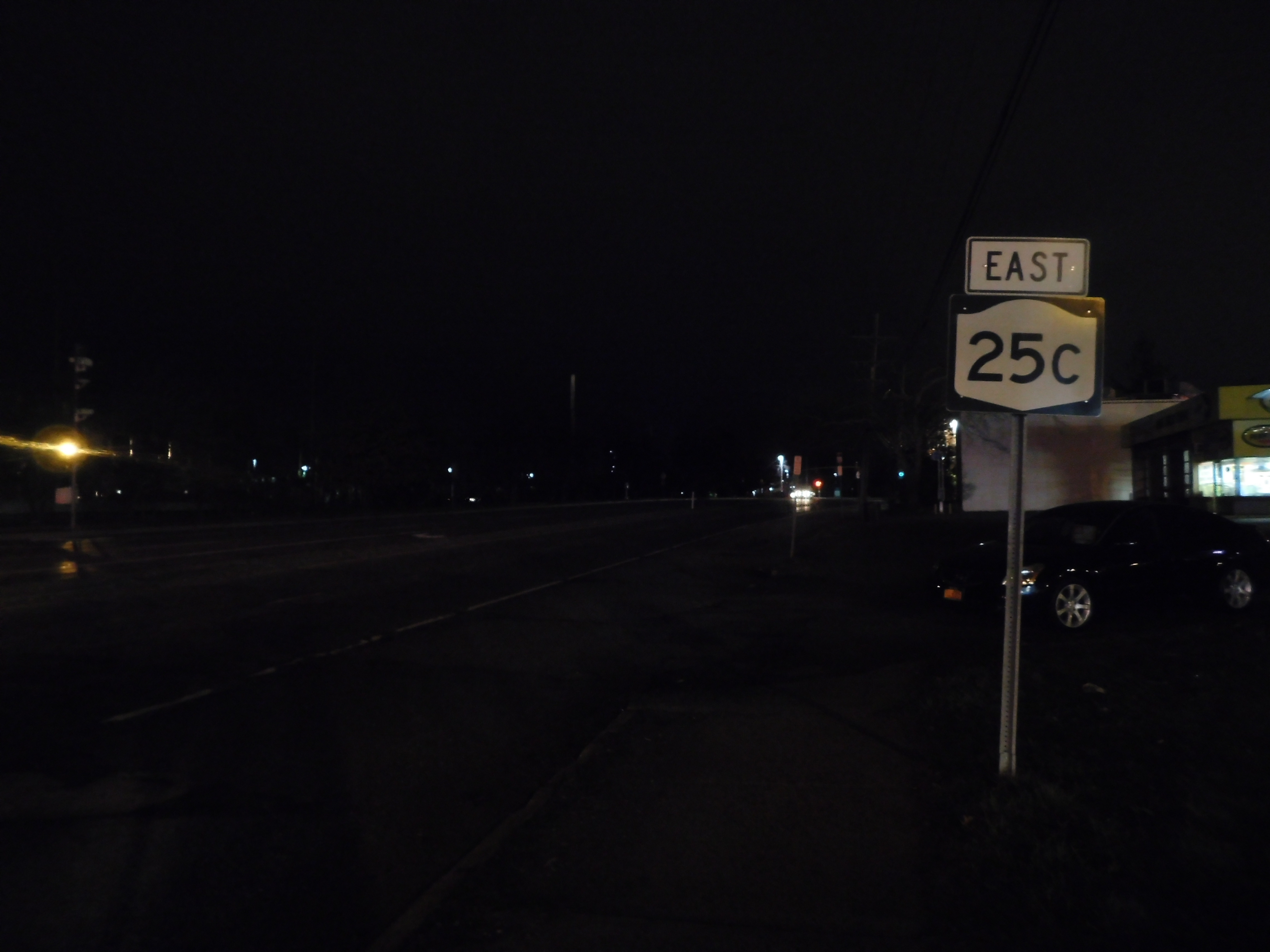
Erroneous signage posted for NY 25C in Nassau County

The NY 25C designation was assigned in the mid-1930s to the portion of Marcus Avenue between Hillside Avenue (NY 25B) and the Northern State Parkway. In the 1940s, the northernmost portion of the route was realigned to follow Union Turnpike west into Queens, where it ended at Springfield Boulevard (then NY 25). The section of Union Turnpike from Kew Gardens to the Nassau County line had been converted from a narrow unpaved road to a paved multi-lane highway in the late 1930s ahead of the 1939 New York World's Fair. NY 25C was city-maintained in Queens, state-maintained from the New York City line to Marcus Avenue, and county-maintained from Union Turnpike to NY 25B. The route remained unchanged until January 1, 1970, when the designation was removed. The 0.81-mile (1.30 km) state-maintained portion of the route's former alignment in Nassau County is now NY 900F, an unsigned reference route.

== Major intersections ==
County	Location	mi	km	Destinations	Notes
Queens	Queens Village	0.00	0.00	NY 25	Western terminus
Queens	Bellerose	0.28	0.45	Grand Central Parkway west	Exit 22 on Grand Central Parkway
Queens	Bellerose	0.28	0.45	To Grand Central Parkway east / Cross Island Parkway	Interchange
Queens	Glen Oaks	1.13	1.82	Cross Island Parkway	Exit 28B on Cross Island Parkway
Nassau	New Hyde Park	4.29	6.90	NY 25B	Eastern terminus
1.000 mi = 1.609 km; 1.000 km = 0.621 mi
