= East Williston, New York =

- Village
- Incorporated Village of East Williston
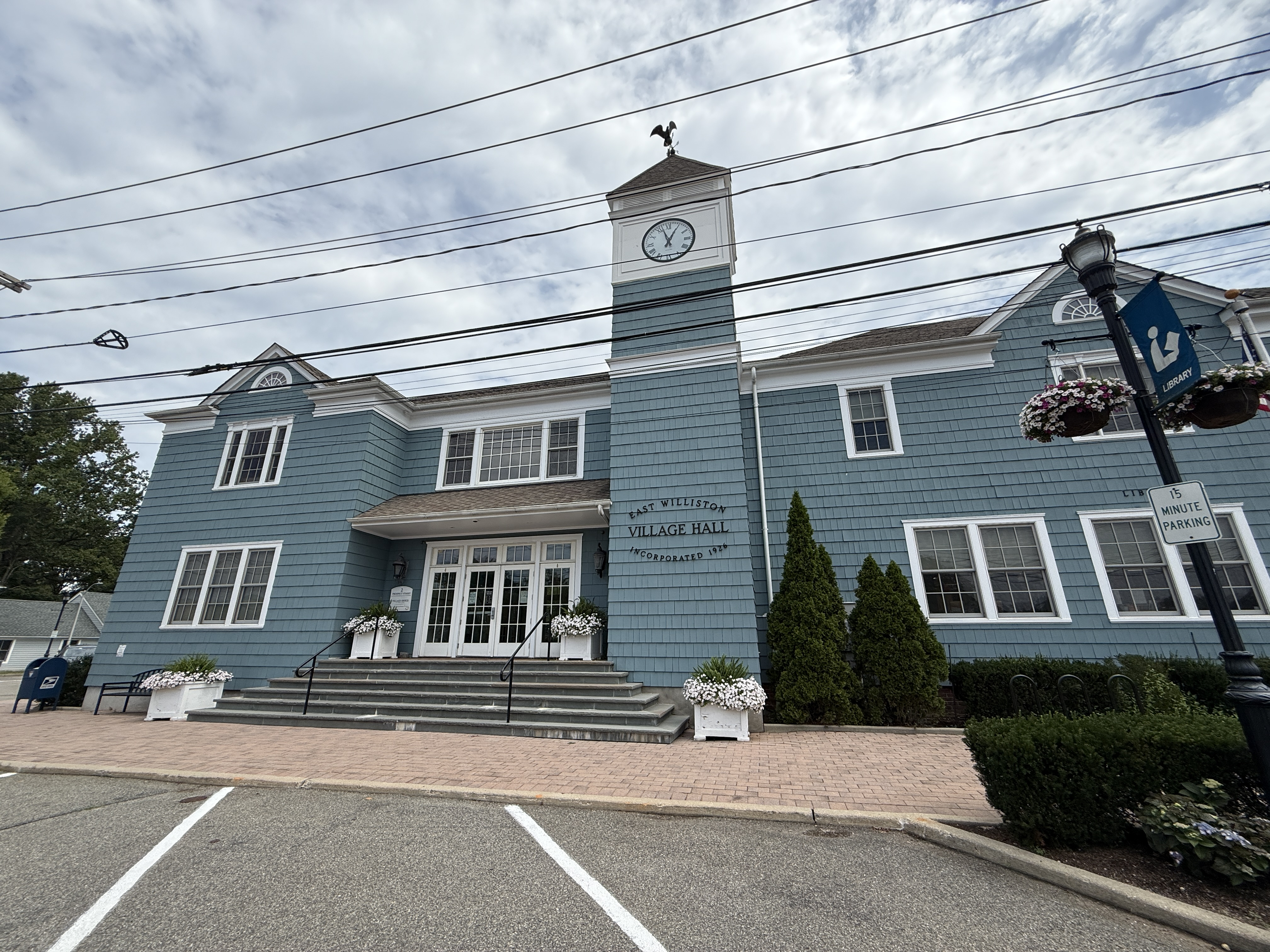
- East Williston Village Hall, Library, and Fire Department in 2025

- Official seal of East Williston

- Location in Nassau County and the state of New York

- Location on Long Island Location within the state of New York
- Coordinates: 40°45′35″N 73°38′0″W
- Country: United States
- State: New York
- County: Nassau
- Town: North Hempstead
- Incorporated: 1926
- Named for: The Willis family; its location being more easterly than Williston in Upstate New York

Government
  - Mayor: Bonnie L.S. Parente
  - Deputy Mayor: Anthony Gallo
  - Trustees: Trustees' List: • Raffaela Dunn; • Anthony Gallo; • James Iannone; • Rushi Vaidya

Area
  - Total: 0.57 sq mi (1.47 km^{2})
  - Land: 0.57 sq mi (1.47 km^{2})
  - Water: 0 sq mi (0.00 km^{2})
- Elevation: 118 ft (36 m)

Population (2020)
  - Total: 2,645
  - Density: 4,651.2/sq mi (1,795.84/km^{2})
- Time zone: UTC-5 (Eastern (EST))
  - Summer (DST): UTC-4 (EDT)
- ZIP code: 11596
- Area codes: 516, 363
- FIPS code: 36-23217
- GNIS feature ID: 0949275
- Website: eastwilliston.gov

East Williston is an incorporated village in the Town of North Hempstead in Nassau County, on Long Island, in New York, United States. The population was 2,645 at the time of the 2020 census.

== History ==
The territory comprising what is now the Village of East Williston was formerly farmland. Most of the farmland was owned by the Willis family in the 1800s. The original borders of the area – then known simply as Williston – stretched west towards Queens to Herricks Road, north to I.U. Willets Road, south to the Village of Mineola, and east to Bacon Road in Old Westbury.

The construction and opening of the Long Island Rail Road through the area – along with the community's train station – in 1865 stimulated manufacturing in East Williston. The industries that grew as a result of the new train station included brick making, windmill making and carriage making. Henry M. Willis designed and built the popular East Williston Runabout Roadcart. This carriage had two wheels and two seats. Its soft suspension allowed comfortable travel over the rough roads of the time. There was also a feature which allowed the body to be locked to the axle, allowing the carriage to be used on the racetrack. Over 1,000 East Williston Runabout Roadcarts were built by Oakley and Griffin (who purchased the business from Willis in 1889).

Although originally called Williston, the name of the area was changed to East Williston in 1879, when locals requested the United States Postal Service to open a local post office. Since there was already a community with a post office in Upstate New York using the name, locals added the word "East" to their community's name; the name East Williston was in use for both this village and what is now the adjacent village of Williston Park.

In 1926, this eastern half of East Williston incorporated as a village. Its western half, Williston Park, incorporated separately that same year; the two halves became separate villages due to each having very different, distinct characteristics.

In the 1930s, the village's Wheatley Ridge housing development was constructed over what had previously been an estate owned by humorist and entertainer Will Rogers. The development was planned and built by Newell & Daniel – a major real estate development firm active at the time on Long Island.

The major east-west route through the village, Hillside Avenue (NY 25B), was formerly called East Williston Avenue, since it connected Queens with East Williston. The East Williston Union Free School District was founded in 1949, as a successor to the East Williston Common School District.

In 1985, the residential and commercial core of East Williston – collectively known today as the East Williston Village Historic District – was designated a national historic district and listed on the National Register of Historic Places.

== Etymology ==
Like its western neighbor, Williston Park, the Village of East Williston is named for Samuel Willis – a settler who came to the area in the late 17th century.

== Geography ==
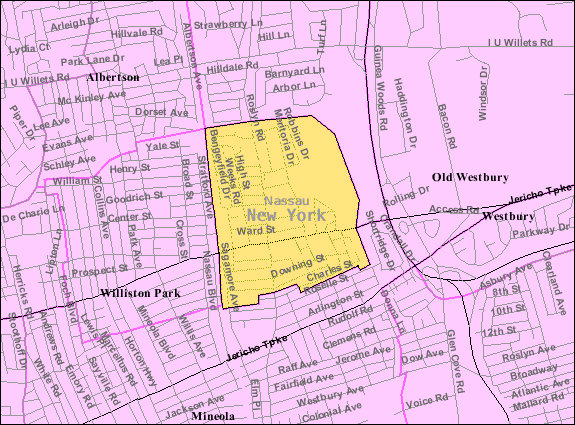
U.S. Census map of East Williston

According to the United States Census Bureau, the village has a total area of 0.6 square miles (1.6 km^{2}), all land.

East Williston is bordered by the incorporated villages of Mineola and Williston Park, in addition to the unincorporated hamlets of Albertson and Roslyn Heights.

=== Drainage ===
East Williston is located within the Mill River Watershed, which, in turn, is located within the larger Long Island Sound/Atlantic Ocean Watershed.

=== Climate ===
According to the Köppen climate classification, East Williston has a Humid subtropical climate (type Cfa) with cool, wet winters and hot, humid summers. Precipitation is uniform throughout the year, with slight spring and fall peaks.

Climate data for East Williston, New York, 1991–2020 normals, extremes 1999–present
Month	Jan	Feb	Mar	Apr	May	Jun	Jul	Aug	Sep	Oct	Nov	Dec	Year
Record high °F (°C)	71 (22)	73 (23)	85 (29)	94 (34)	97 (36)	101 (38)	105 (41)	104 (40)	100 (38)	90 (32)	83 (28)	76 (24)	105 (41)
Mean daily maximum °F (°C)	39 (4)	43 (6)	50 (10)	61 (16)	70 (21)	80 (27)	85 (29)	83 (28)	76 (24)	65 (18)	55 (13)	45 (7)	63 (17)
Mean daily minimum °F (°C)	26 (−3)	28 (−2)	34 (1)	42 (6)	51 (11)	61 (16)	66 (19)	65 (18)	58 (14)	48 (9)	40 (4)	31 (−1)	46 (8)
Record low °F (°C)	−10 (−23)	−7 (−22)	3 (−16)	13 (−11)	32 (0)	43 (6)	50 (10)	48 (9)	38 (3)	27 (−3)	10 (−12)	−1 (−18)	−10 (−23)
Average precipitation inches (mm)	3.62 (92)	3.17 (81)	4.35 (110)	4.15 (105)	3.90 (99)	3.85 (98)	4.40 (112)	3.72 (94)	3.91 (99)	4.08 (104)	3.73 (95)	3.82 (97)	46.7 (1,186)
Source: The Weather Channel

==== Plant zone ====
According to the United States Department of Agriculture (USDA), East Williston is located within hardiness zone 7b.

== Demographics ==
Historical population
Census	Pop.	Note	%±
1930	493		—
1940	1,152		133.7%
1950	1,734		50.5%
1960	2,940		69.6%
1970	2,808		−4.5%
1980	2,708		−3.6%
1990	2,515		−7.1%
2000	2,503		−0.5%
2010	2,556		2.1%
2020	2,645		3.5%
U.S. Decennial Census

=== Racial and ethnic composition ===
East Williston village, New York – Racial and ethnic composition Note: the US Census treats Hispanic/Latino as an ethnic category. This table excludes Latinos from the racial categories and assigns them to a separate category. Hispanics/Latinos may be of any race.
Race / Ethnicity (NH = Non-Hispanic)	Pop 2000	Pop 2010	Pop 2020	% 2000	% 2010	% 2020
White alone (NH)	2,334	2,316	2,060	93.25%	90.61%	77.88%
Black or African American alone (NH)	9	8	5	0.36%	0.31%	0.19%
Native American or Alaska Native alone (NH)	1	0	0	0.04%	0.00%	0.00%
Asian alone (NH)	84	99	340	3.36%	3.87%	12.85%
Native Hawaiian or Pacific Islander alone (NH)	2	0	0	0.08%	0.00%	0.00%
Other race alone (NH)	4	0	7	0.16%	0.00%	0.26%
Mixed race or Multiracial (NH)	10	23	83	0.40%	0.90%	3.14%
Hispanic or Latino (any race)	59	110	150	2.36%	4.30%	5.67%
Total	2,503	2,556	2,645	100.00%	100.00%	100.00%

=== 2020 census ===
As of the 2020 census, East Williston had a population of 2,645. The median age was 43.6 years. 26.0% of residents were under the age of 18 and 17.7% were 65 years of age or older. For every 100 females, there were 98.9 males, and for every 100 females age 18 and over, there were 95.6 males.

100.0% of residents lived in urban areas, while 0.0% lived in rural areas.

There were 828 households in East Williston, of which 40.9% had children under the age of 18 living in them. Of all households, 78.3% were married-couple households, 5.7% were households with a male householder and no spouse or partner present, and 15.0% were households with a female householder and no spouse or partner present. About 11.9% of all households were made up of individuals, and 8.0% had someone living alone who was 65 years of age or older.

There were 864 housing units, of which 4.2% were vacant. The homeowner vacancy rate was 1.3%, and the rental vacancy rate was 0.0%.

=== 2000 census ===
As of the census of 2000, there were 2,503 people, 833 households, and 717 families residing in the village. The population density was 4,447.5 inhabitants per square mile (1,717.2/km^{2}). There were 846 housing units at an average density of 1,503.2 per square mile (580.4/km^{2}). The racial makeup of the village was 95.25% White, 0.36% African American, 0.04% Native American, 3.36% Asian, 0.08% Pacific Islander, 0.24% from other races, and 0.68% from two or more races. Hispanic or Latino of any race were 2.36% of the population.

There were 833 households, out of which 42.5% had children under the age of 18 living with them, 77.4% were married couples living together, 6.4% had a female householder with no husband present, and 13.9% were non-families. 12.7% of all households were made up of individuals, and 8.8% had someone living alone who was 65 years of age or older. The average household size was 3.00 and the average family size was 3.29.

In the village, the population was spread out, with 28.2% under the age of 18, 5.8% from 18 to 24, 22.7% from 25 to 44, 27.8% from 45 to 64, and 15.5% who were 65 years of age or older. The median age was 41 years. For every 100 females, there were 95.4 males. For every 100 females age 18 and over, there were 90.7 males.

The median income for a household in the village was $109,111, and the median income for a family was $118,611. Males had a median income of $90,952 versus $44,861 for females. The per capita income for the village was $50,484. About 1.4% of families and 1.7% of the population were below the poverty line, including 2.6% of those under age 18 and 1.0% of those age 65 or over.

== Government ==
=== Village government ===
As of August 2024, the Mayor of East Williston is Bonnie L.S. Parente, the Deputy Mayor is Anthony Gallo, and the Village Trustees are Raffaela Dunne, Anthony Gallo, James L. Iannone, and Rushi Vaidya.

=== Representation in higher government ===
==== Town representation ====
East Williston is located in the Town of North Hempstead's 3rd council district, which as of August 2024 is represented on the North Hempstead Town Council by Dennis J. Walsh (R–Mineola).

==== Nassau County representation ====
East Williston is located in Nassau County's 9th Legislative district, which as of August 2024 is represented in the Nassau County Legislature by Scott Strauss (R–Mineola).

==== New York State representation ====
===== New York State Assembly =====
East Williston is located in the New York State Assembly's 19th State Assembly district, which as of August 2024 is represented in the New York State Assembly by Edward P. Ra (R–Garden City South).

===== New York State Senate =====
East Williston is located in the New York State Senate's 7th State Senate district, which as of August 2024 is represented in the New York State Senate by Jack M. Martins (R–Old Westbury).

==== Federal representation ====
===== United States Congress =====
East Williston is located entirely within New York's 3rd Congressional district, which as of August 2024 is represented in the United States Congress by Thomas R. Suozzi (D–Glen Cove).

===== United States Senate =====
Like the rest of New York, East Williston is represented in the United States Senate by Charles Schumer (D) and Kirsten Gillibrand (D).

=== Politics ===
In the 2024 United States presidential election, the majority of East Williston voters voted for Donald J. Trump (R).

== Education ==
=== Schools ===
The Village of East Williston, in its entirety, is located within the boundaries of (and is thus served by) the East Williston Union Free School District. Accordingly, all children who reside within the village and attend public schools go to that district's schools.

Additionally, the East Williston UFSD's North Side School is located within the village.

=== Library ===
The Village of East Williston has its own public library, known the East Williston Public Library. This library is located at Village Hall.

== Notable people ==
- Carol Alt, supermodel and actress.
- Michael Balboni, former New York State Senator for the 7th district; former Director of the New York State Office of Homeland Security
- John D. Caemmerer (1928–1982), lawyer and politician who served in the New York Senate.
- Jack Kirby, comic book artist, co-creator of Captain America, the X-Men, the Fantastic Four and numerous other characters.
- Carol Leifer, writer and comedian.
- Christopher Masterson, actor.
- Danny Masterson, convicted rapist and former actor.
- Will Rogers, humorist and entertainer.
- Maureen Ryan O'Connell, Nassau County Clerk; former New York State Assemblywoman for the 17th district.

== See also ==
- List of municipalities in New York
- Williston Park, New York
- Williston, New York
