= Herricks, New York =

- Hamlet and census-designated place
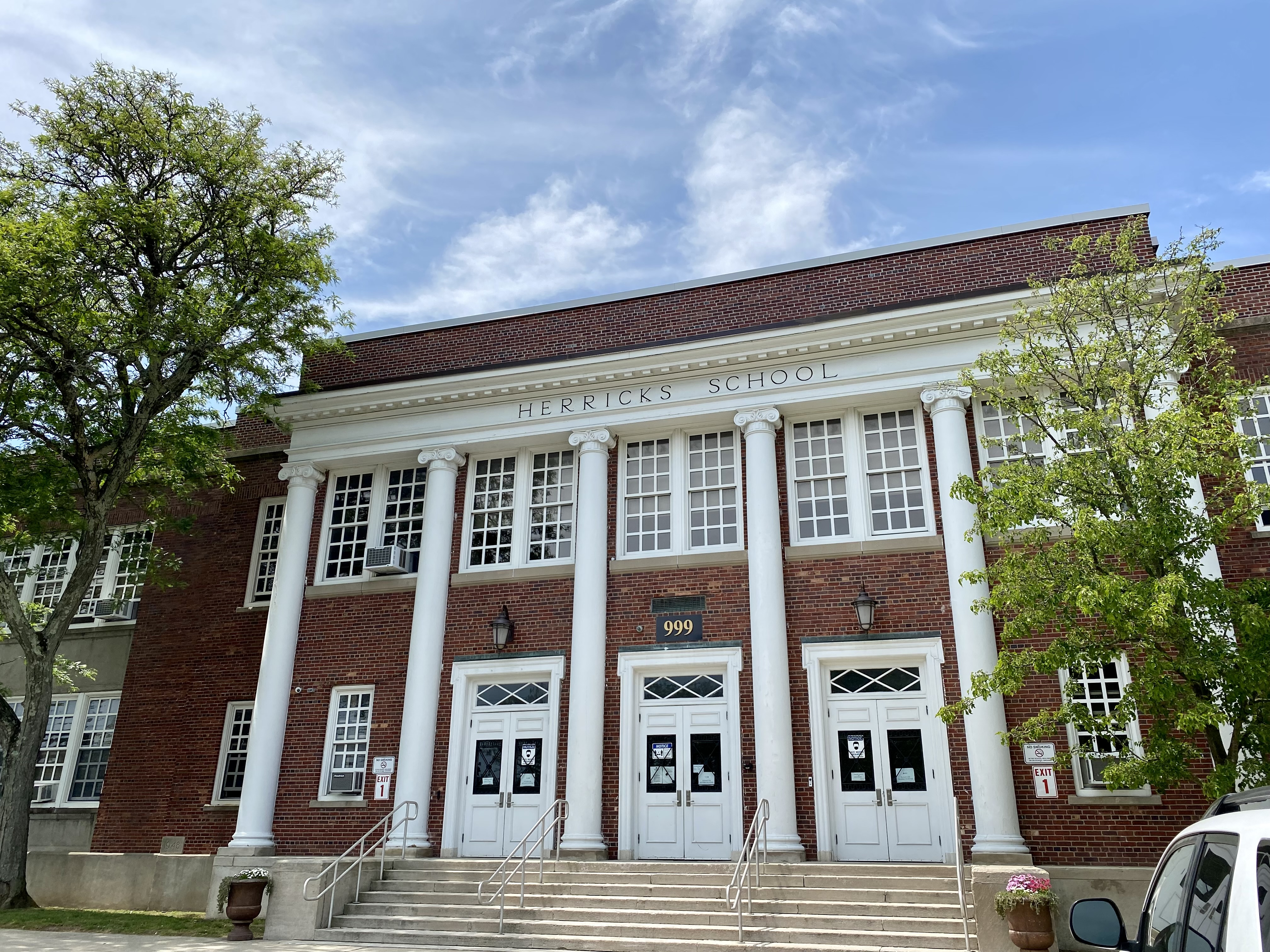
- The Herricks Community Center, located in the former Herricks School

- Location in Nassau County and the state of New York

- Location on Long Island Location within the state of New York
- Coordinates: 40°45′23″N 73°39′44″W
- Country: United States
- State: New York
- County: Nassau
- Town: North Hempstead
- Named for: Herricks Path

Area
  - Total: 0.57 sq mi (1.48 km^{2})
  - Land: 0.57 sq mi (1.48 km^{2})
  - Water: 0 sq mi (0.00 km^{2})
- Elevation: 115 ft (35 m)

Population (2020)
  - Total: 4,398
  - Density: 7,676.3/sq mi (2,963.82/km^{2})
- Time zone: UTC-5 (Eastern (EST))
  - Summer (DST): UTC-4 (EDT)
- ZIP Codes: 11040 (New Hyde Park); 11596 (Williston Park)
- Area codes: 516, 363
- FIPS code: 36-34198
- GNIS feature ID: 0952637

Herricks is a hamlet and census-designated place (CDP) in the southern part of the Town of North Hempstead in Nassau County, on Long Island, in New York, United States. The population was 4,398 at the time of the 2020 census.

== History ==
The community is named for Herricks Path – a path which existed and ran through the area as early as 1659.

The school in Herricks was established in 1813, making it one of the oldest in Nassau County. This school, too, was named for Herricks Path.

By 1898, the Herricks School was one of Queens County's last single-room schools and, subsequently, the school would be one of the last in Nassau County, following Nassau County's split from Queens County in 1899.

== Geography ==
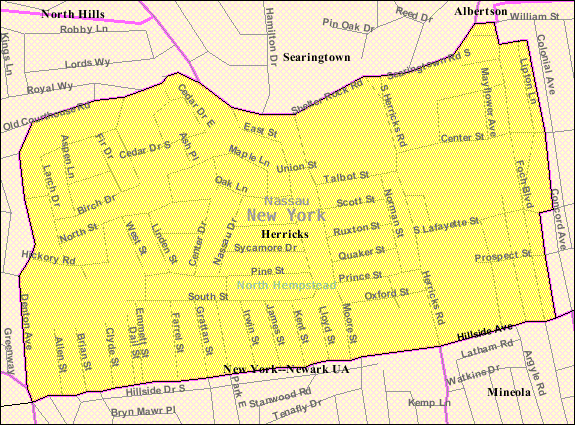
U.S. Census map of Herricks

According to the United States Census Bureau, the CDP has a total area of 0.6 square miles (1.6 km^{2}), all land.

Herricks is bordered by Searingtown Road (CR 101)/Shelter Rock Road (CR 8) to the north, Hillside Avenue (NY 25B) to the south (and forming the Herricks–Garden City Park border), Williston Park to the east, and Manhasset Hills and Marcus Avenue (CR D46) to the west.

Mail delivery in the CDP is provided by the New Hyde Park Post Office, and it utilizes the New Hyde Park, NY 11040 Zip Code.

== Demographics ==
Historical population
Census	Pop.	Note	%±
2000	4,076		—
2010	4,295		5.4%
2020	4,398		2.4%
U.S. Decennial Census

=== 2020 census ===
As of the 2020 census, Herricks had a population of 4,398. The median age was 45.5 years. 20.4% of residents were under the age of 18 and 21.4% of residents were 65 years of age or older. For every 100 females there were 95.7 males, and for every 100 females age 18 and over there were 92.3 males age 18 and over.

100.0% of residents lived in urban areas, while 0.0% lived in rural areas.

There were 1,330 households in Herricks, of which 37.4% had children under the age of 18 living in them. Of all households, 71.3% were married-couple households, 9.7% were households with a male householder and no spouse or partner present, and 17.2% were households with a female householder and no spouse or partner present. About 12.6% of all households were made up of individuals and 9.4% had someone living alone who was 65 years of age or older.

There were 1,380 housing units, of which 3.6% were vacant. The homeowner vacancy rate was 1.1% and the rental vacancy rate was 7.8%.

Racial composition as of the 2020 census
Race	Number	Percent
White	1,515	34.4%
Black or African American	27	0.6%
American Indian and Alaska Native	22	0.5%
Asian	2,530	57.5%
Native Hawaiian and Other Pacific Islander	3	0.1%
Some other race	99	2.3%
Two or more races	202	4.6%
Hispanic or Latino (of any race)	196	4.5%

=== 2010 census ===
According to the 2010 census, there were 4,295 people residing in the CDP. The racial makeup of the CDP was 52.6% White, 0.5% African American, 0.10% Native American, 43.2% Asian, 0.10% Pacific Islander, 1.1% from other races, and 2.4% from two or more races. Hispanic or Latino of any race were 3.9% of the population. 23.2% of the population are Asian Indians, 9.1% are Chinese and 1.6% are Filipino.

=== 2000 census ===
As of the census of 2000, there were 4,076 people, 1,349 households, and 1,121 families residing in the CDP. The population density was 7,284.4 inhabitants per square mile (2,812.5/km^{2}). There were 1,371 housing units at an average density of 2,450.2 per square mile (946.0/km^{2}). The racial makeup of the CDP was 72.74% White, 0.29% African American, 0.10% Native American, 24.39% Asian, 0.10% Pacific Islander, 0.93% from other races, and 1.45% from two or more races. Hispanic or Latino of any race were 4.17% of the population.

There were 1,349 households, out of which 37.1% had children under the age of 18 living with them, 71.9% were married couples living together, 8.9% had a female householder with no husband present, and 16.9% were non-families. 14.9% of all households were made up of individuals, and 10.0% had someone living alone who was 65 years of age or older. The average household size was 3.02 and the average family size was 3.38.

In the CDP, the population was spread out, with 23.9% under the age of 18, 6.8% from 18 to 24, 25.4% from 25 to 44, 25.2% from 45 to 64, and 18.7% who were 65 years of age or older. The median age was 41 years. For every 100 females, there were 90.9 males. For every 100 females age 18 and over, there were 88.1 males.

The median income for a household in the CDP was $78,343, and the median income for a family was $84,451. Males had a median income of $55,125 versus $40,658 for females. The per capita income for the CDP was $31,518. About 2.4% of families and 4.5% of the population were below the poverty line, including 7.3% of those under age 18 and 1.2% of those age 65 or over.

== Parks and recreation ==
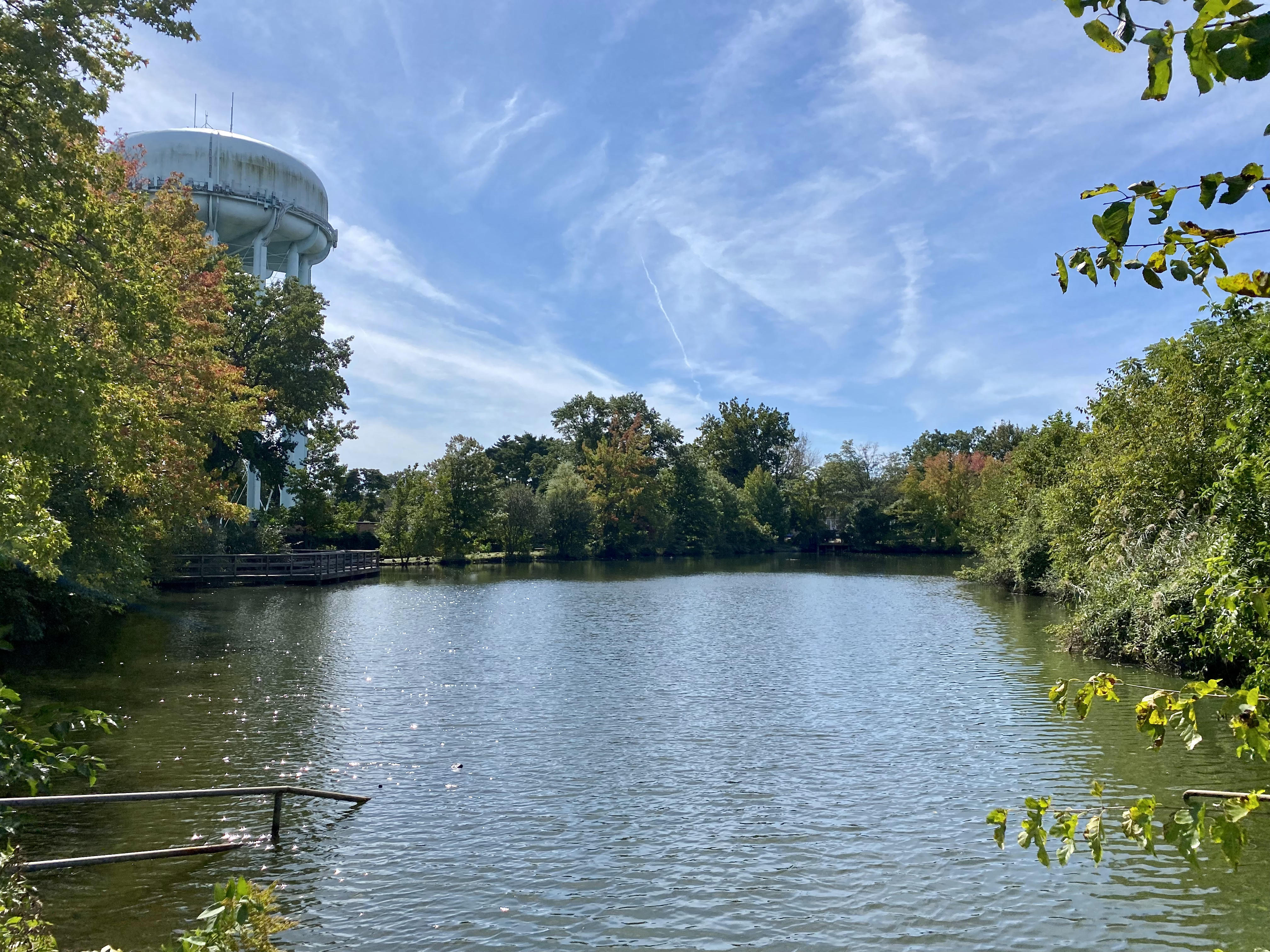
Herricks Pond, located at Herricks Pond Park, in 2021

The County of Nassau maintains Herricks Pond Park, which is a passive park located within the hamlet.

== Government ==
=== Town representation ===
As Herricks is an unincorporated part of the Town of North Hempstead, it is directly governed by the town's government in Manhasset.

As of June 2025, Herricks is located with the Town of North Hempstead's 4th council district, which is represented on the North Hempstead Town Council by Christine Liu (D–Herricks).

=== Representation in higher government ===
==== Nassau County representation ====
Herricks is located in Nassau County's 10th Legislative district, which as of June 2025 is represented in the Nassau County Legislature by Mazi Melesa Pilip (R–Great Neck).

==== New York State representation ====
===== New York State Assembly =====
Herricks is located in the New York State Assembly's 16th State Assembly district, which as of June 2025 is represented by Daniel J. Norber (R–Great Neck).

===== New York State Senate =====
Herricks is located in the New York State Senate's 7th State Senate district, which as of June 2025 is represented in the New York State Senate by Jack M. Martins (R–Old Westbury).

==== Federal representation ====
===== United States Congress =====
Herricks is located in New York's 3rd congressional district, which as of June 2025 is represented in the United States Congress by Thomas R. Suozzi (D).

===== United States Senate =====
Like the rest of New York, Herricks is represented in the United States Senate by Charles Schumer (D) and Kirsten Gillibrand (D).

=== Politics ===
In the 2016 U.S. presidential election, the majority of Herricks voters voted for Hillary Clinton (D).

== Education ==
=== School districts ===
Herricks is located entirely within the boundaries of (and is thus served by) the Herricks Union Free School District. As such, children who reside within Herricks and attend public schools go to the Herricks UFSD's schools.

=== Library districts ===
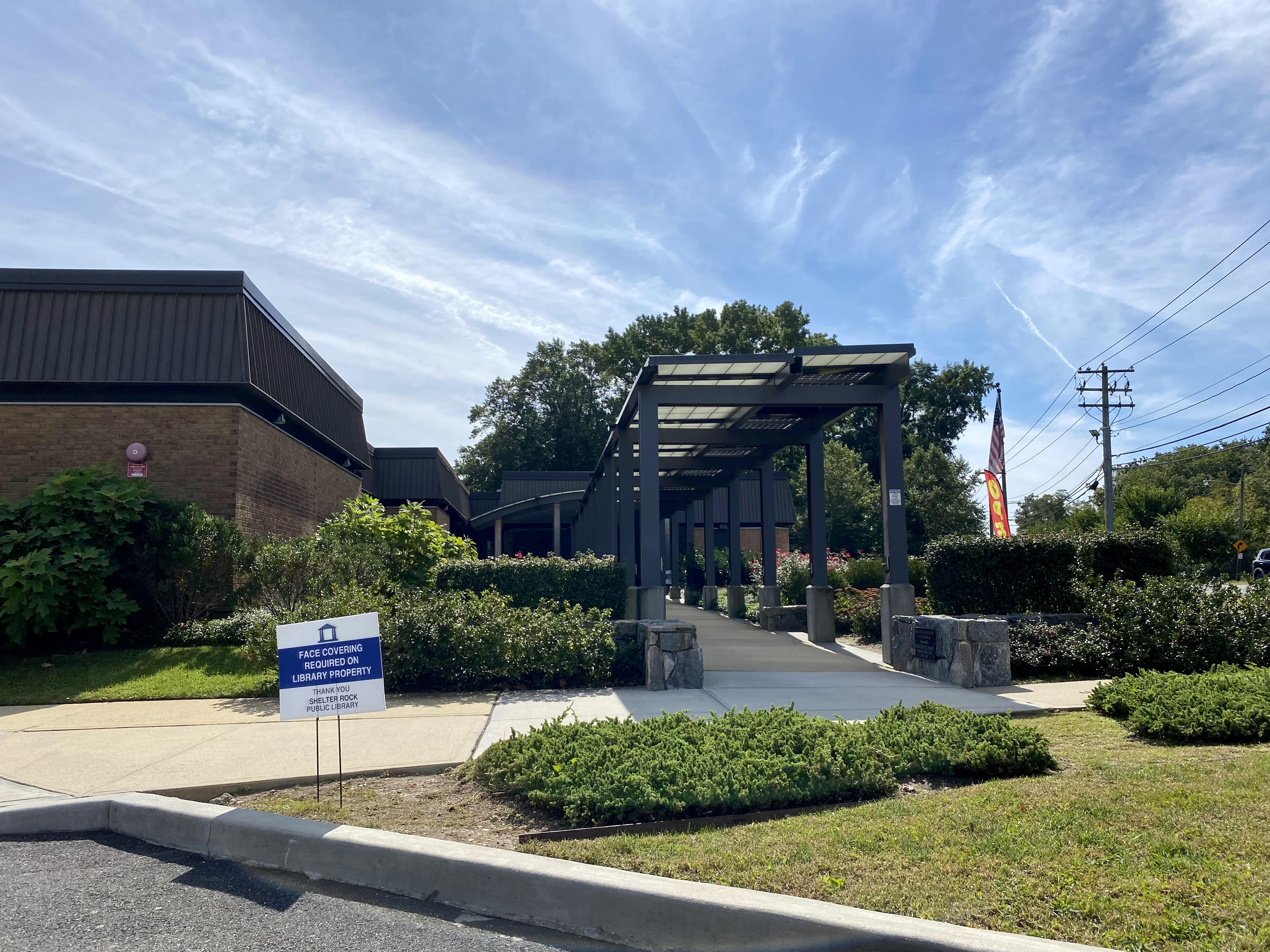
The main entrance to the Shelter Rock Public Library in 2021

Herricks is located within the boundaries of (and is thus served by) the Shelter Rock Library District. The library serving the district, the Shelter Rock Public Library, is located within the hamlet.

== Infrastructure ==
=== Transportation ===
==== Road ====
Hillside Avenue (New York State Route 25B) forms the hamlet's southern border, with Garden City Park and the Incorporated Village of Mineola.

Other major roads which travel through Herricks include Denton Avenue, Herricks Road (CR 8), Old Courthouse Road, Searingtown Road (CR 101), and Shelter Rock Road (CR 8).

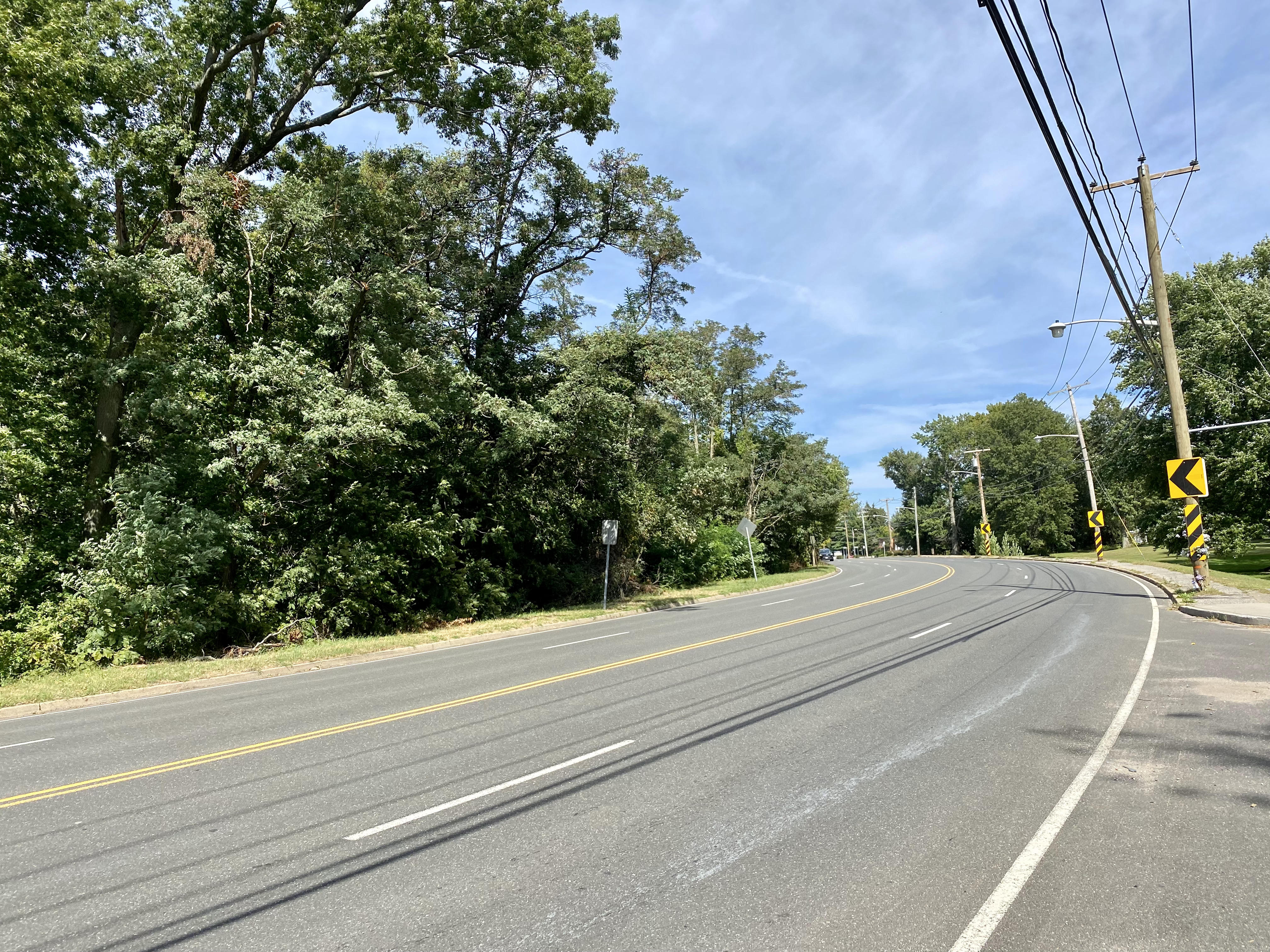
Searingtown Road in Herricks in 2021

==== Rail ====
No rail lines pass through Herricks. The nearest Long Island Rail Road stations to the hamlet are New Hyde Park on the Main Line and East Williston on the Oyster Bay Branch.

==== Bus ====
The n22 and n22X run along Hillside Avenue at the hamlet's southern border. These bus lines is operated by Nassau Inter-County Express (NICE).

=== Utilities ===
==== Natural gas ====
National Grid USA provides natural gas to homes and businesses that are hooked up to natural gas lines in Herricks.

==== Power ====
PSEG Long Island provides power to all homes and businesses within Herricks, on behalf of the Long Island Power Authority.

==== Sewage ====
All of Herricks is connected to sanitary sewers. These sewers are part of the Nassau County Sewage District, which handles and treats the hamlet's sanitary waste.

==== Water ====
Herricks is located within the boundaries of the Garden City Park Water District, which provides the entire hamlet with water.

== See also ==
- Herricks Union Free School District
- Herricks High School
