= The Corner Bar =

American television sitcom (1972–1973)

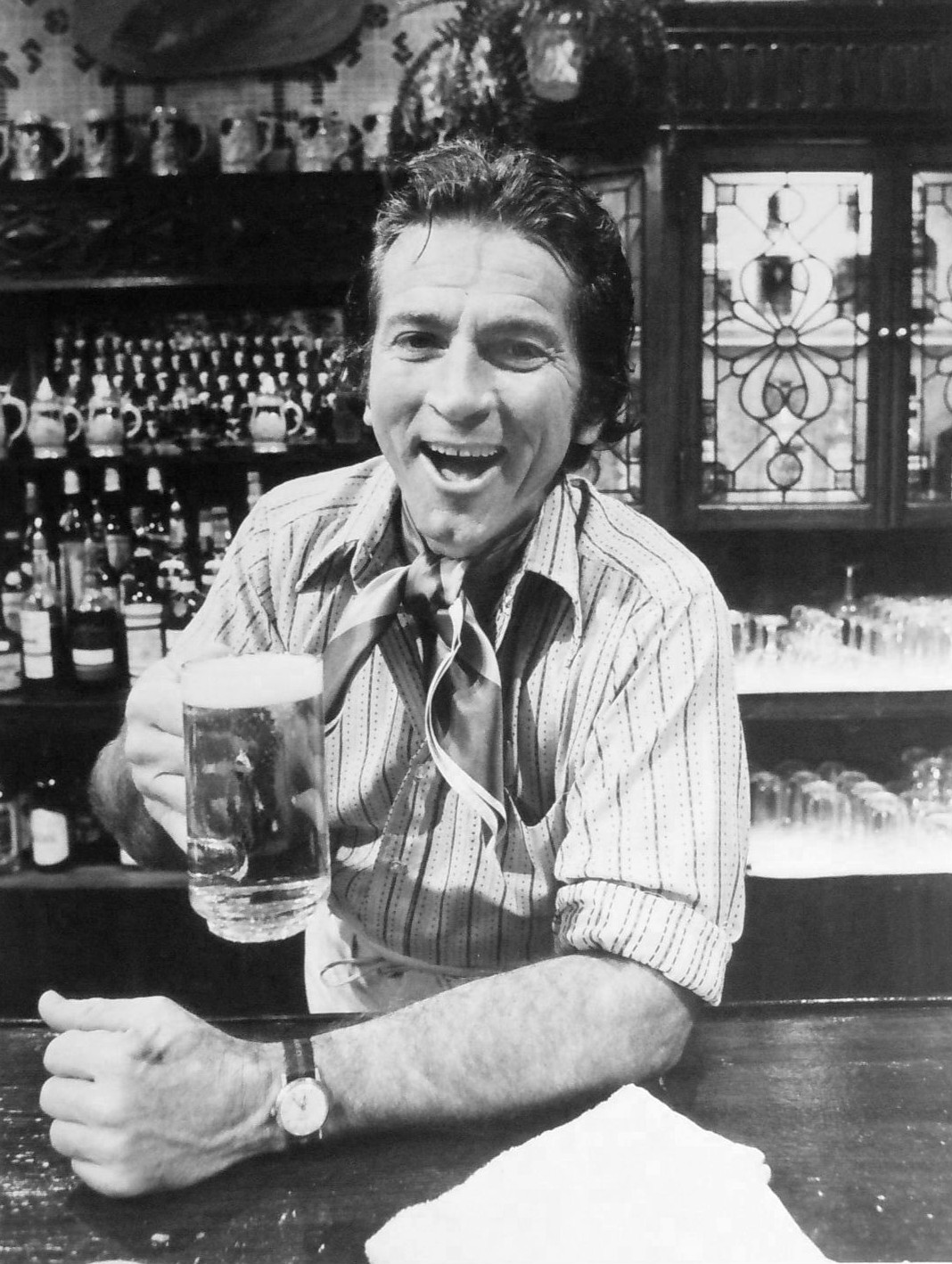
- Gabriel Dell as Harry Grant, 1972
- Genre: Sitcom
- Written by: Norman Barasch
- Directed by: Peter Baldwin; Rick Edelstein
- Starring: Gabriel Dell; Anne Meara; Eugene Roche; J. J. Barry; Shimen Ruskin; Bill Fiore
- Country of origin: United States
- Original language: English
- No. of seasons: 2
- No. of episodes: 16

Production
- Running time: 30 minutes
- Production company: Alan King Productions

Original release
- Network: ABC
- Release: June 21, 1972 – September 7, 1973

The Corner Bar is an American television sitcom that aired as a summer-replacement series on ABC from June 21, 1972 to August 23, 1972, and again from August 3, 1973 to September 7, 1973.

The show, created by comedian Alan King and veteran comedy writer Herb Sargent, was co-produced by King and comedian Howard Morris. The center of activity is a New York City tavern called Grant's Toomb [sic]. The series is notable for its inclusion of the first recurring gay character on American television.

The show's producer, comedian Alan King, videotaped 10 half-hour episodes before live audiences, to be aired as a Wednesday-night summer-replacement series in 1972. Customarily, a summer series would return the following January as a mid-season replacement, but The Corner Bar did not return until the following summer, and then as a Friday-night mini-series.

Gabriel Dell, originally a member of the Dead End Kids, starred as affable New York bartender Harry Grant. Grant presided over a motley crew of staff members and regular customers: sad-sack 65-year-old waiter Meyer Shapiro (Shimen Ruskin), cook Joe (Joe Keyes, Jr.), kooky waitress Mary Ann (Langhorne Scruggs), tipsy lawyer Phil Bracken (Bill Fiore), roughneck cab driver Fred Costello (J.J. Barry), and flamboyantly gay designer Pete Panama (Vincent Schiavelli), "a dead ringer for Tiny Tim in manner and dress," according to columnist Kay Gardella. The building was owned by landlady Jennifer Bradley (Anne Meara).

The show was taped in New York City, much to native New Yorker Gabe Dell's regret: his dressing room was robbed while the cast was before the cameras. "We're off to a good start," grumbled Dell. "I'm missing my address book and wallet. If we were making the series in Hollywood this would never have happened. Why we're making the series here I don't know. I was a dedicated New Yorker once myself." Dell remarked that the name of the corner bar was supposed to be Grant's Tomb, but the sign painter misspelled it "Toomb." Dell offered to "let it ride", reasoning that a small businessman in the same position would just shrug it off.

== Blue-collar comedy ==
Producer Alan King gave out advance publicity that the show would make humorous observations about politics and current events, much as the current hit All in the Family was doing. The Corner Bar was actually more like radio's Duffy's Tavern, with its back-and-forth banter and blue-collar bartender. When owner Harry is resentful of celebrities patronizing a rival tavern, a radical suggests bringing in the Harrisburg Eight or the Chicago Nine. "No," says Harry, "I don't want no rock groups here."

As the series progressed, the scripts and the ensemble cast settled into a broadly comic groove. Dell's former colleague and close friend Huntz Hall appeared in "The Navy Reunion" as a con man. Another episode, "Harry and the Hoods", had Alan King (as himself) masterminding a scheme to scare off two extortionists. King masqueraded in slouch hat and pinstriped suit as Harry's ominous "godfather", with the regulars in costume as his mob:

Alan King: Right, boys?
Fred the cabbie: Yes, papa.
Phil the lawyer: Yes, papa.
Pete the designer: You're so right, daddy!

Variety commented, "There was no message or pauses for sentiment, with everybody a character with eccentric flaws, and it worked quite well in broad comedy terms. [The] series utilized only one set, and it's a good one." Another critic agreed: "It's a light piece of nonsense but Gabriel Dell as Harry and the expert cast of farceurs carry it off." Columnist Dan Lewis reported that "the audience response was much greater, so don't count The Corner Bar out of future programming at the network. The Corner Bar is a particular favorite of key network executives, and the people in the series, including producer Alan King, have been alerted to the possibility of it becoming a mid-season replacement." Despite good reviews, the series was not picked up for additional episodes.

== Encore ==
The Corner Bar returned the following summer, but producer Alan King had to scramble to assemble a handful of new episodes. ABC needed an emergency fill-in to replace a failed summer series, Love Thy Neighbor. Thus the second season of The Corner Bar made its debut in midsummer (August 3, 1973) and ran for only six episodes.

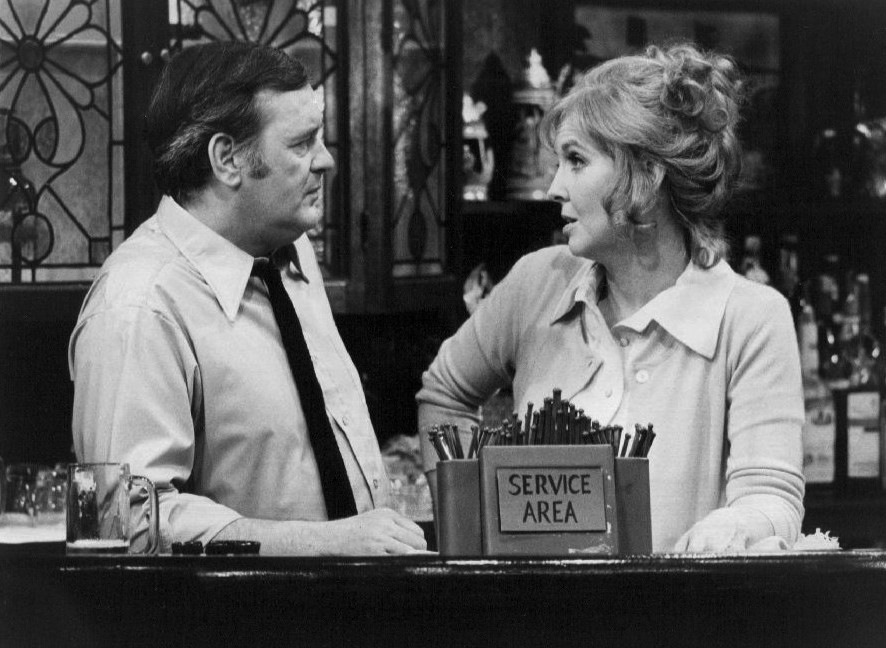
Eugene Roche and Anne Meara in The Corner Bar, 1973

Gabe Dell wasn't available for the rush assignment, so the tavern was taken over by the building's landlady, now named Mae (Anne Meara) and her late husband's business partner Frank Flynn (Eugene Roche). The venue, no longer called Grant's Toomb, was now doing business as The Corner Bar. Regulars Phil and Fred were still on hand but now the only staff member was Meyer, and the flamboyant designer was replaced by the "flamboyant actor" Donald Hooten (Ron Carey). Like the previous year's series, the mini-series was taped in New York.

Alan King and Howard Morris continued as producers; Anne Meara's husband and comedy-team partner Jerry Stiller was now the associate producer. Meara was optimistic that the show would have a longer run: "Sure, we want it to go, and be picked up for the winter, but who knows, dat's-a-da show biz, right?"

The reboot got mixed reviews. Paul Jones of the Atlanta Constitution was a fan, and wrote, "It was hoped by many that ABC would put The Corner Bar in its fall lineup but the series will run only through Sept. 7. Hopefully it will return if one of the new series already scheduled falls by the wayside." Syndicated TV columnist Jay Sharbutt reviewed the first episode and said bluntly, "Its only virtue is that it may drive you to drink. On the positive side, Ron Carey as the actor and Bill Fiore as the lawyer are scene-stealing standouts in a good cast that does its best with a dog of a script. The Corner Bar may get better in coming episodes -- first shows have a tendency to be bad -- but the series is scheduled to run only six weeks. ABC officials say there's a strong possibility it'll return next year as a midseason replacement. If it gets better, fine. If not, well, we might still have Watergate as an alternative."

The series ended after its six-episode encore, and was not picked up for further episodes. The Corner Bar has not been seen since its original runs in 1972 and 1973.

== Cast ==
- Gabriel Dell as Harry Grant, owner and bartender (Season 1)
- J.J. Barry as Fred Costello, cab driver
- Bill Fiore as Phil Bracken, lawyer
- Vincent Schiavelli as Peter Panama, designer (Season 1)
- Shimen Ruskin as Meyer Shapiro, waiter
- Joe Keyes, Jr. as Joe, cook (Season 1)
- Langhorne Scruggs as Mary Ann, waitress (Season 1)
- Anne Meara as Jennifer Bradley, landlady (Season 1), Mae, landlady (Season 2)
- Eugene Roche as Frank Flynn, Mae's business partner (Season 2)
- Ron Carey as Donald Hooten, actor (Season 2)

== Episodes ==
=== Season 1 (1972) ===
No. overall	No. in series	Title	Directed by	Written by	Original release date
1	1	"Politics"	Dave Wilson	Norman Barasch & Carroll Moore	June 21, 1972
Harry tries to "class up" his tavern by throwing a political campaign party. When a noisy challenger shows up, TV newscasters report the chaos.
2	2	"Flanagan's Wake"	Unknown	Unknown	June 28, 1972
An elderly patron's last request is to have his wake held in Grant's Toomb.
3	3	"Quarantine"	Unknown	Unknown	July 5, 1972
Nobody can leave the bar when a health official quarantines it.
4	4	"Harry and the Hoods"	Dave Wilson	Norman Barasch & Carroll Moore	July 12, 1972
Alan King helps the gang foil two shakedown artists.
5	5	"Cook's Night Out"	Unknown	Unknown	July 19, 1972
To impress his prospective mother-in-law, Joe the cook tells her he owns the tavern.
6	6	"Bonnie's Bundle"	Unknown	Unknown	July 26, 1972
Substitute waitress Bonnie is pregnant but won't identify the father. The gang finds him, a TV weatherman.
7	7	"The Generation Canyon"	Unknown	Unknown	August 2, 1972
Meyer and Fred are unnerved when their respective children plan to drop out of college.
8	8	"The Sexy Landlady"	Unknown	Unknown	August 9, 1972
Harry's lease is about to expire, and the widowed landlady Jennifer Bradley (Anne Meara) wants to tear down the building.
9	9	"The Navy Reunion"	Unknown	Unknown	August 16, 1972
Harry's old shipmate Sparky Schnauzer (Huntz Hall) drops in for a visit, and tries to con Harry into buying real estate in New Mexico.
10	10	"The Strike"	Unknown	Unknown	August 23, 1972
Meyer, Joe, and Mary Ann go on strike, leaving the regulars to substitute for them.

=== Season 2 (1973) ===
No. overall	No. in series	Title	Directed by	Written by	Original release date
11	1	"Father's Day"	Rick Edelstein	Norman Steinberg, Alan Uger	August 3, 1973
A young Korean claims to be the long-lost son of war veteran Frank.
12	2	"To Your Good Health"	Unknown	Unknown	August 10, 1973
Frank has to lose 15 pounds or pay $300 more for insurance.
13	3	"Mixed Doubles"	Peter Baldwin	Unknown	August 17, 1973
Two couples are acting suspiciously, and Mae thinks they want to use the Corner Bar as a rendezvous for a wife-swapping club.
14	4	"Fifty Grand"	Unknown	Unknown	August 24, 1973
A diplomat entrusts his briefcase to cabbie Fred, but a customer walks off with the wrong briefcase, leaving Fred with one containing $50,000 in stolen money. The thieves, coming back for the cash, hold the regulars hostage.
15	5	"The Space on the Barroom Floor"	Unknown	Unknown	August 31, 1973
The gang discovers that someone has actually stolen the Corner Bar -- only the bare walls remain, and the culprit demands a $2000 ransom.
16	6	"Aunt Blanche"	Unknown	Unknown	September 7, 1973
Blanche, the outspoken aunt of Mae's late husband, goes to work at the Corner Bar. The regulars threaten to boycott the place until Blanche leaves.
