= Williston Park, New York =

- Village
- Incorporated Village of Williston Park
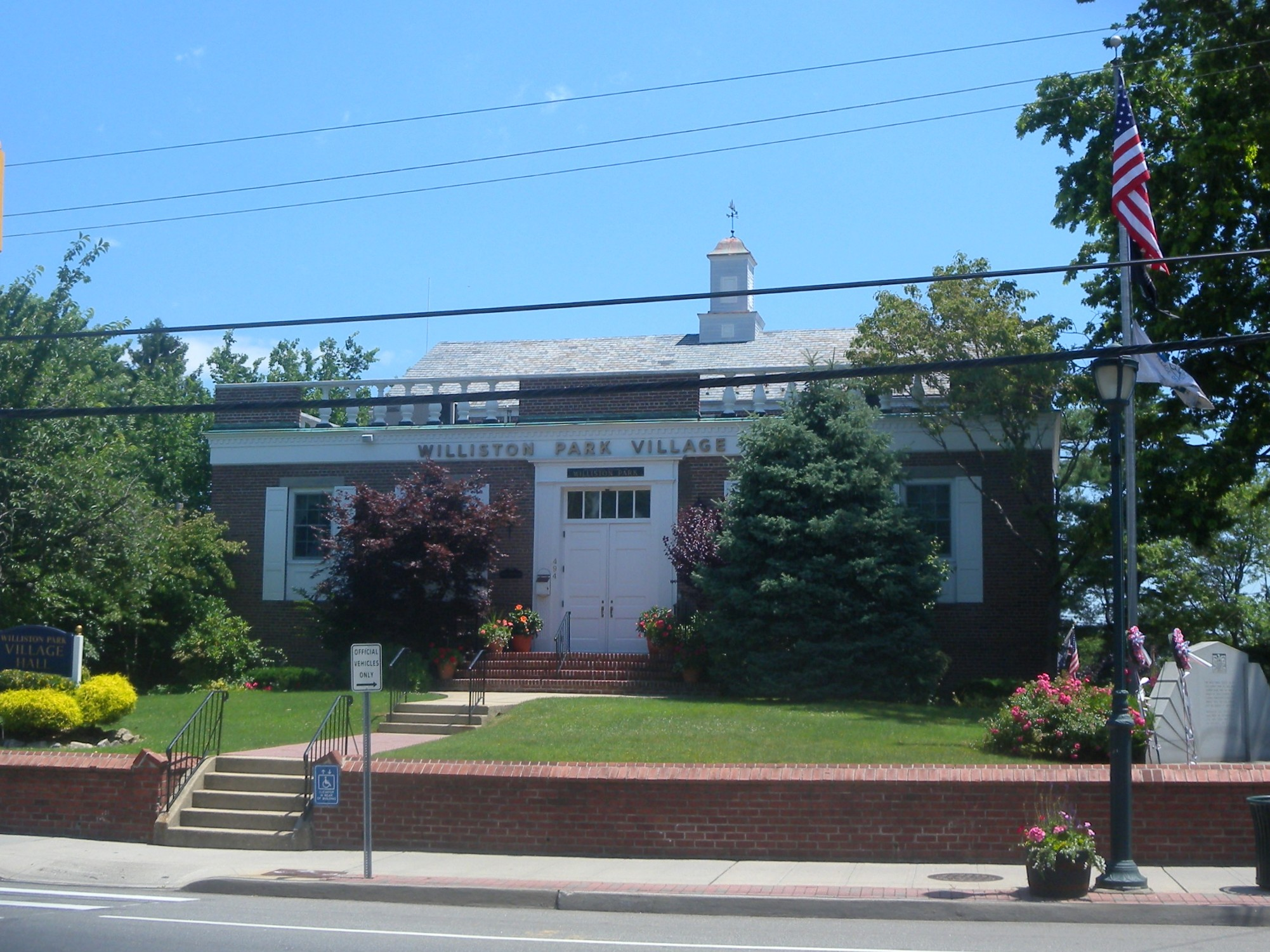
- Williston Park Village Hall in 2012

- Location in Nassau County and the state of New York

- Location on Long Island Location within the state of New York
- Coordinates: 40°45′29″N 73°38′45″W
- Country: United States
- State: New York
- County: Nassau
- Town: North Hempstead
- Incorporated: September 8, 1926
- Named after: Samuel Willis; the Williston Park housing development

Government
  - Mayor: Paul M. Ehrbar
  - Deputy Mayor: Kevin Rynne
  - Trustee: Trustees' List: • William Carr; • William O'Brien; • Kevin Rynne; • Michael Uttaro

Area
  - Total: 0.63 sq mi (1.62 km^{2})
  - Land: 0.63 sq mi (1.62 km^{2})
  - Water: 0 sq mi (0.00 km^{2})
- Elevation: 121 ft (37 m)

Population (2020)
  - Total: 7,591
  - Density: 12,121.3/sq mi (4,680.06/km^{2})
- Time zone: UTC-5 (Eastern (EST))
  - Summer (DST): UTC-4 (EDT)
- ZIP Codes: 11596 (Williston Park); 11501 (Mineola)
- Area codes: 516, 363
- FIPS code: 36-82117
- GNIS feature ID: 0971331
- Website: www.willistonparkny.gov

Williston Park is an incorporated village in the Town of North Hempstead in Nassau County, on Long Island, in New York, United States. The population was 7,591 at the time of the 2020 census.

== History ==
Williston Park was founded in the early 20th century after 195 acres (0.79 km^{2}) of land were purchased by New York City developer William Chatlos, who had been seeking to create an affordable, planned community for New York City residents wishing to move to the suburbs. Later that year, residents of the village voted to break with the residents of East Williston and formally incorporate the village; that community also incorporated as its own village thats same year. In light of the successful referendum to incorporate, the Village of Williston Park officially incorporated on September 8, 1926.

=== Etymology ===
Williston Park is named for Samuel Willis, a settler who came to the area in the late 17th century – along with the Williston Park housing development constructed in what would become the village during the early 20th century. The home of one of the members of the Willis family stood in the village until the 1950s.

== Geography ==
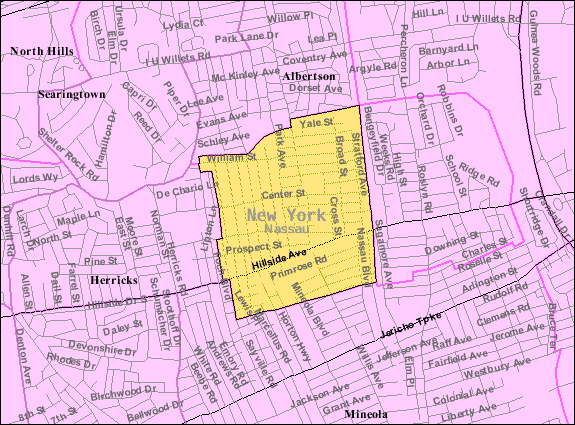
U.S. Census map of Williston Park

According to the United States Census Bureau, the village has a total area of 0.6 square miles (1.6 km^{2}), all land.

Williston Park is bordered by the incorporated villages of Mineola and East Williston, along with to the unincorporated hamlets of Albertson and Herricks, and Roslyn Heights.

=== Drainage ===
Williston Park is located within the Mill River Watershed, which itself is located within the larger Long Island Sound/Atlantic Ocean Watershed.

=== Climate ===
According to the Köppen climate classification, Williston Park has a Humid subtropical climate (type Cfa) with cool, wet winters and hot, humid summers. Precipitation is uniform throughout the year, with slight spring and fall peaks.

Climate data for Williston Park, New York, 1991–2020 normals, extremes 1999–present
Month	Jan	Feb	Mar	Apr	May	Jun	Jul	Aug	Sep	Oct	Nov	Dec	Year
Record high °F (°C)	71 (22)	73 (23)	85 (29)	94 (34)	97 (36)	101 (38)	105 (41)	104 (40)	100 (38)	90 (32)	83 (28)	76 (24)	105 (41)
Mean daily maximum °F (°C)	39 (4)	43 (6)	50 (10)	61 (16)	70 (21)	80 (27)	85 (29)	83 (28)	76 (24)	65 (18)	55 (13)	45 (7)	63 (17)
Mean daily minimum °F (°C)	26 (−3)	28 (−2)	34 (1)	42 (6)	51 (11)	61 (16)	66 (19)	65 (18)	58 (14)	48 (9)	40 (4)	31 (−1)	46 (8)
Record low °F (°C)	−10 (−23)	−7 (−22)	3 (−16)	13 (−11)	32 (0)	43 (6)	50 (10)	48 (9)	38 (3)	27 (−3)	10 (−12)	−1 (−18)	−10 (−23)
Average precipitation inches (mm)	3.62 (92)	3.17 (81)	4.35 (110)	4.15 (105)	3.90 (99)	3.85 (98)	4.40 (112)	3.72 (94)	3.91 (99)	4.08 (104)	3.73 (95)	3.82 (97)	46.7 (1,186)
Source: The Weather Channel

==== Plant zone ====
According to the United States Department of Agriculture (USDA), Williston Park is located within hardiness zone 7b.

== Demographics ==
Historical population
Census	Pop.	Note	%±
1930	4,427		—
1940	5,750		29.9%
1950	7,505		30.5%
1960	8,255		10.0%
1970	9,154		10.9%
1980	8,216		−10.2%
1990	7,516		−8.5%
2000	7,261		−3.4%
2010	7,287		0.4%
2020	7,591		4.2%
U.S. Decennial Census

As of the census of 2020, there were 7,591 people, 2,691 households, and 1,959 families residing in the village. The population density was 12,126.20 inhabitants per square mile (4,681.95/km^{2}). There were 2,787 housing units at an average density of 4,423.8 per square mile (1,708.0/km^{2}). The racial makeup of the village was 67.8% White, 1.2% Black or African American, 0.1% American Indian and Alaska Native, 19.2% Asian, 4.0% from other races, and 7.7% from two or more races. Hispanic or Latino of any race were 9.9% of the population.

There were 2,691 households, out of which 33.4% had children under the age of 18 living with them, 60.3% were married couples living together, 2.9% were unmarried couples living together, 24.0% had a female householder with no spouse or partner present, and 12.7% had a male householder with no spouse or partner present. 33.4% of households had individuals under 18 years of age, and 38.6% had individuals 65 years of age and older.

21.3% of the population was below the age of 18, and 19.0% of the population was above the age of 65. The median age was 43.9.

According to the American Community Survey, The median income for a household in the village was estimated at $120,625. About 1.2% of the population were below the poverty line in 2020, including 4.6% of those aged 65 years or older.

== Government ==
As of April 2026, the Mayor of Williston Park is Paul M. Ehrbar, the Deputy Mayor is Kevin Rynne, and the Village Trustees are William Carr, William O'Brien, Kevin Rynne, and Michael Uttaro.

=== Representation in higher government ===
==== Town representation ====
Williston Park is located in the Town of North Hempstead's 3rd council district, which as of August 2024 is represented on the North Hempstead Town Council by Dennis J. Walsh (R–Mineola).

==== Nassau County representation ====
Williston Park is located in Nassau County's 18th Legislative district, which as of August 2024 is represented in the Nassau County Legislature by Samantha A. Goetz (R–Locust Valley).

==== New York State representation ====
===== New York State Assembly =====
Williston Park is located in the New York State Assembly's 19th State Assembly district, which as of August 2024 is represented in the New York State Assembly by Edward P. Ra (R–Garden City South).

===== New York State Senate =====
Williston Park is located in the New York State Senate's 7th State Senate district, which as of August 2024 is represented in the New York State Senate by Jack M. Martins (R–Old Westbury).

==== Federal representation ====
===== United States Congress =====
Williston Park is located entirely within New York's 3rd Congressional district, which as of August 2024 is represented in the United States Congress by Thomas R. Suozzi (D–Glen Cove).

===== United States Senate =====
Like the rest of New York, Williston Park is represented in the United States Senate by Charles Schumer (D) and Kirsten Gillibrand (D).

=== Politics ===
In the 2020 U.S. presidential election, the majority of Williston Park voters voted for Donald J. Trump (R).

== Education ==
=== Schools ===
==== Public ====
The Village is served by two school districts: the Mineola Union Free School District and Herricks Union Free School District. As such, children who reside within the village and attend public schools go to school in one of these two districts, depending upon where they live within Williston Park.

==== Private ====
Williston Park is also home to St. Aidan's Catholic Elementary lower and upper schools. Additionally, Cross Street Elementary School, originally operated by the Mineola Union Free School District, served until 1996 as the police academy for the Nassau County Police Department. The building currently serves as the home of the Schechter School of Long Island Upper School.

=== Library ===
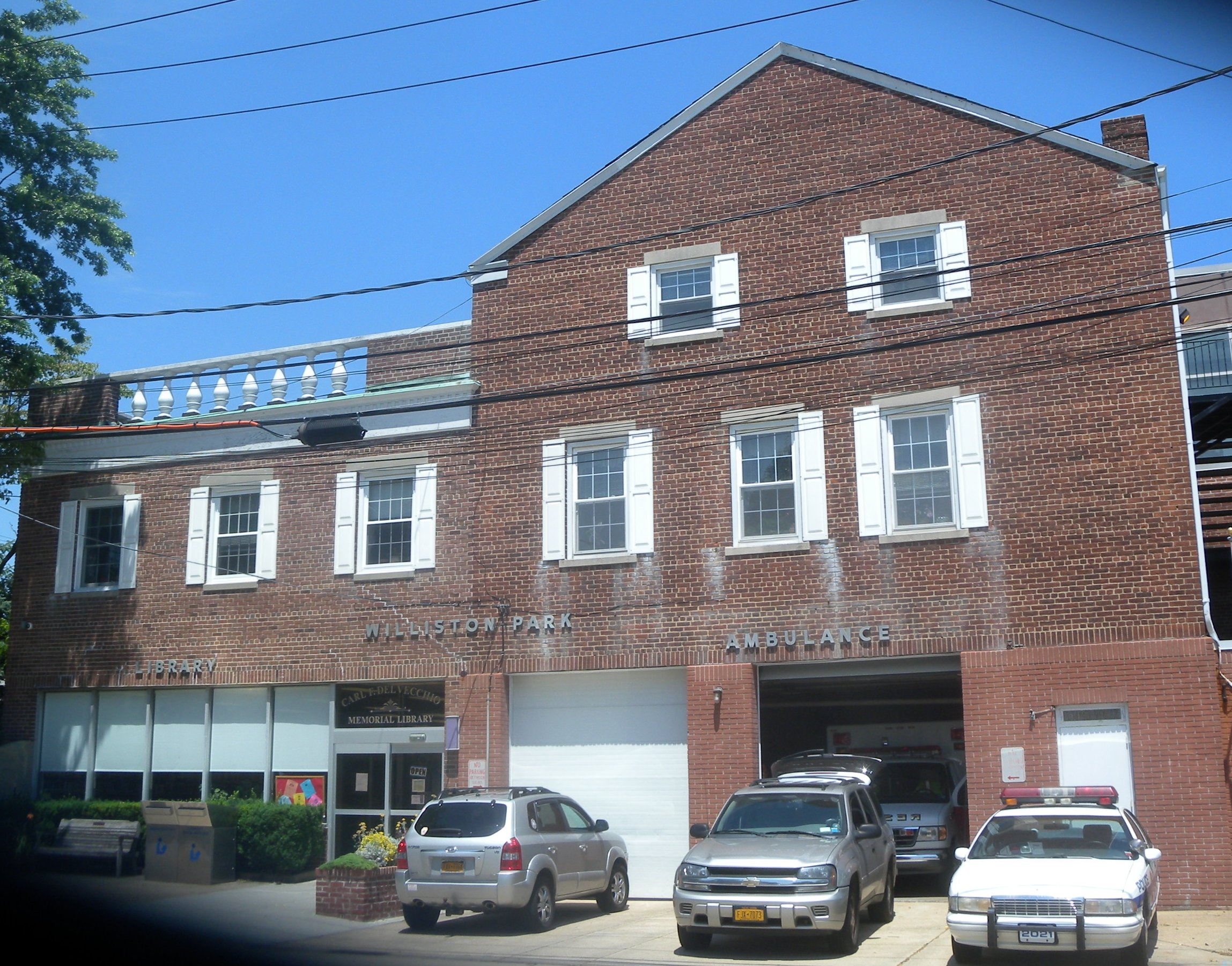
The Williston Park Public Library, visible at left.

The Village of Williston Park has its own public library: the Williston Park Public Library. This library – also known as the Carl F. Del Vecchio Memorial Library – is located at Village Hall and is a member of the Nassau Library System.

== Notable people ==
- John D. Caemmerer - Former New York State Senator.
- Bill Fiore - Actor of American television, Film, Voice-over. Appeared on The Mary Tyler Moore show in Season One, Episode Twelve: "Anchorman Overboard."
- Liam McHugh - NBC hockey sportscaster.
- Christopher Ruddy - CEO of Newsmax Media, Inc.
- Stephen Schwartz - Composer.
- Jaclyn Smith - Paralympic Athlete.
- Aimee Kemp - Science Teacher and Wildlife Activist

== See also ==
- List of municipalities in New York
- East Williston, New York
- Williston, New York
