= Bill Fiore =

American television, film and voice actor

- Born: William Fiore; January 1, 1940; Williston Park, New York, U.S.
- Died: October 3, 2014 (aged 74); New York City, New York, U.S.
- Occupations: Actor; Voice Actor
- Years active: 1968–2001

William Fiore (January 1, 1940 – October 3, 2014) was an American television, film and voice actor. Over his lengthy career, he appeared in television shows such as The Mary Tyler Moore Show, Tales from the Darkside, Law & Order and Rocket Power. Fiore was born January 1, 1940, in Williston Park, New York. His first film role was in The Swimmer (1968).

Aside from television and film work, Fiore also appeared in many television commercials during the 1960s and 1970s, including the popular “Hi, guy!” Right Guard antiperspirant ads with actor Chuck McCann, who appeared as his neighbor on the other side of a shared medicine cabinet.

He then provided the voice for the character Darkel in the video game Grand Theft Auto III (2001), and even though his character was cut from the final game, he is still credited in it.

Fiore died on October 3, 2014, in New York City, aged 74.

== Filmography ==
=== Film ===
Year	Title	Role	Notes
1968	The Swimmer	Howie Hunsacker	
1978	Peeping Times	Prisoner	Television movie
1979	Murder by Natural Causes	Marty Chambers	Television movie
1979	Better Late Than Never	Tom Wallace	Television movie

=== Television ===
Year	Title	Role	Notes
1970	The Mary Tyler Moore Show	Dave Curson	Episode: “Anchorman Overboard”
1971	The Courtship of Eddie's Father	Mr. Weston	Episode: “Dear Mr. Cooper aka Eddie Meets an Astronaut”
1972–1973	The Corner Bar	Phil Bracken	Fifteen episodes
1974	Love, American Style	Andrew	Episode: “Love and the Extra Job/Love and the Flying Finletters/Love and the Golden Worm/Love and the Itchy Condition/Love and the Patrolperson” 177 Season 2 Episode 3 of Alice 86 waitress
1977	Laverne & Shirley	Phil Franklin	Episode: “Buddy Could You Spare A Father?”
1977	Three's Company	Harvey	Episode: “Jack Looks for a Job”
1977	Alice	Kenny Cole	Episode: “86 the Waitresses”
1985	Tales from the Darkside	Horace X	Voice; Episode: “The False Prophet”
1992–1999	Law & Order	Buddy / Ray Russo	Two episodes
1999	Rocket Power	Spokesguy / Host of Family Fun Day	Voice, two episodes
