= Williston, New York =

Hamlet in New York, United States

Coordinates: 42°49′39″N 78°30′59″W

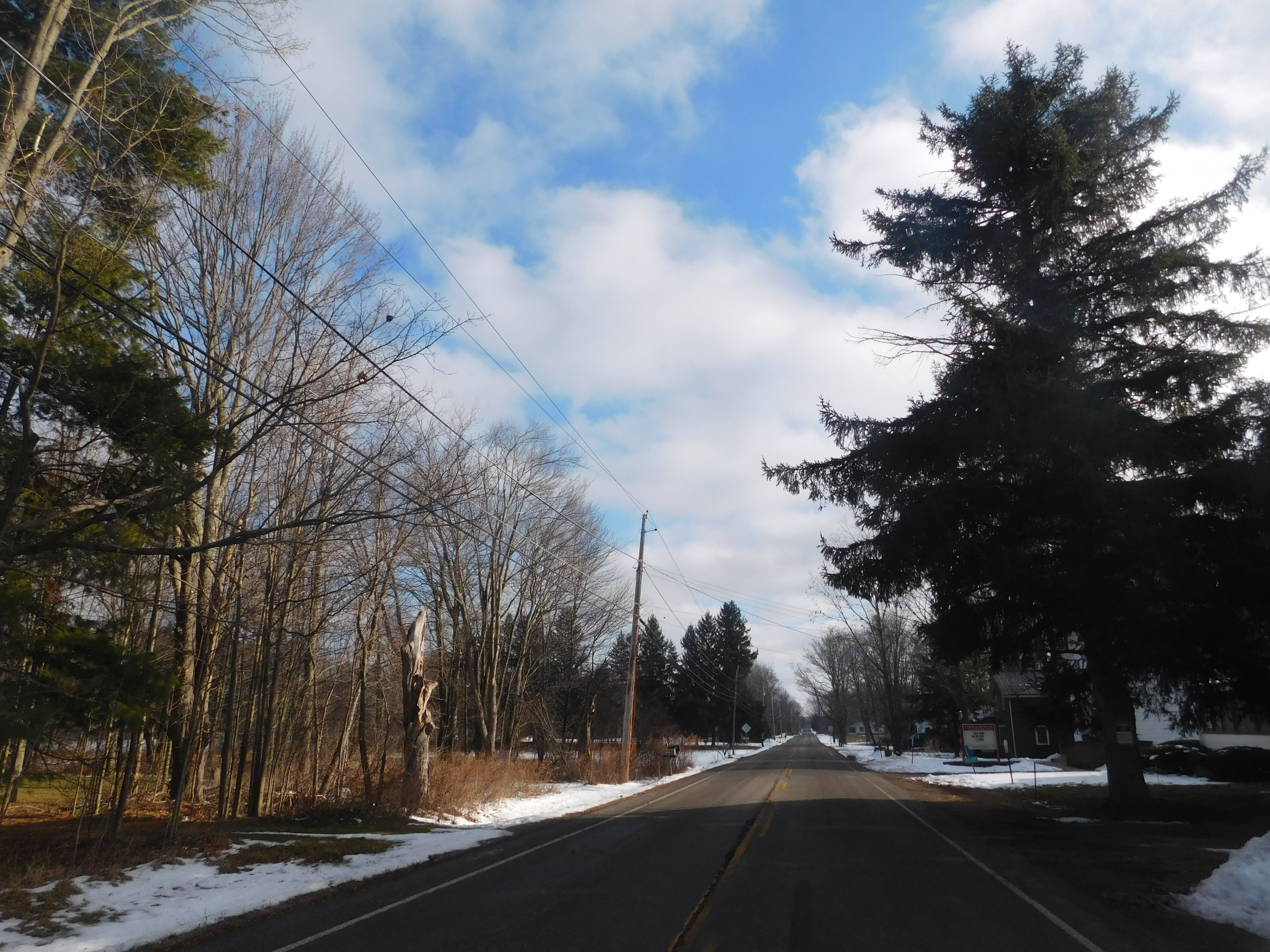
Williston in January 2021

Williston is a hamlet in the town of Marilla in Erie County, New York, United States.

== See also ==
- East Williston, New York – An incorporated village in southern New York, on Long Island.
- Williston Park, New York – Another incorporated village on Long Island, located immediately adjacent to East Williston.
