= East Williston station =

Long Island Rail Road station in Nassau County, New York

East Williston
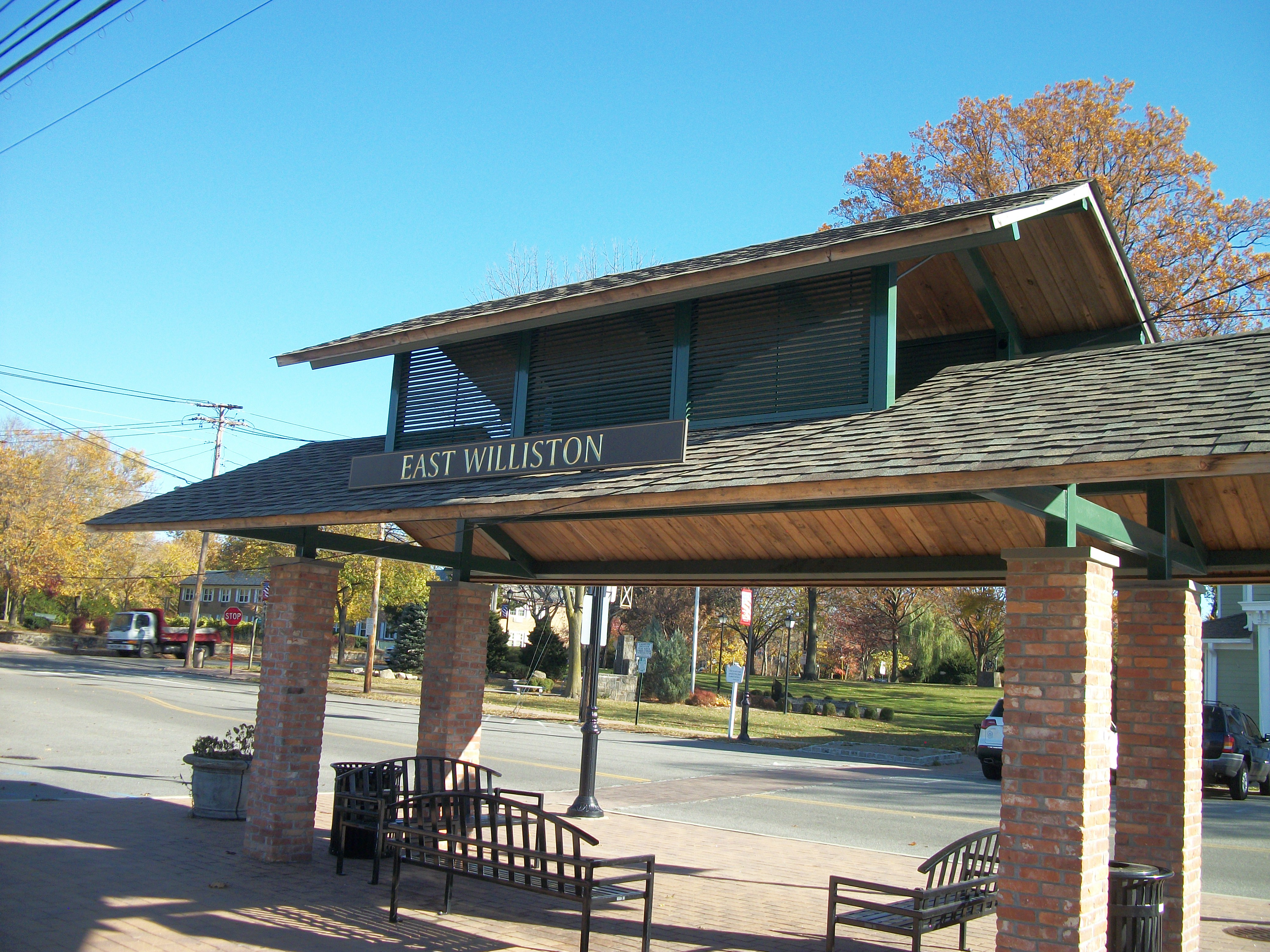
- The decorative shelter for East Williston station

General information
- Location: NY 25B & Pennsylvania Avenue; East Williston and Williston Park, NY
- Coordinates: 40.75614°N 73.639426°W
- Owner: Long Island Rail Road
- Line: Oyster Bay Branch
- Distance: 19.8 mi (31.9 km) from Long Island City
- Platforms: 2 side platforms
- Tracks: 2
- Connections: Nassau Inter-County Express: n27 (n27 stops three blocks east on Roslyn Road)

Construction
- Parking: Yes
- Cycle facilities: Yes
- Accessible: Yes

Other information
- Station code: EWN
- Fare zone: 4

History
- Opened: February 1880
- Rebuilt: 1965-1966, 1982
- Electrified: June 1934; 750 V (DC) third rail

Passengers
- 2012—2014: 724 per weekday

Services
Preceding station	Long Island Rail Road	Following station
Mineola toward Penn Station, Jamaica or Long Island City	Oyster Bay Branch	Albertson toward Oyster Bay
Location

East Williston is the first station along the Oyster Bay Branch of the Long Island Rail Road, located at Hillside Avenue (NY 25B) and Pennsylvania Avenue on the border between East Williston and Williston Park, in Nassau County, New York.

Electric third rail territory ends just north of the station, but as of 2024, all service is provided by diesel bi-level trains.

== History ==
East Williston's station house opened in February 1880 by the Glen Cove Branch Rail Road. It originally contained a freight house and wooden platform shelters that were closed during the mid-20th century.

The third rail was installed from Mineola to East Williston in June 1934; there were originally plans to electrify the entirety Oyster Bay Branch – although these plans never succeeded. East Williston was also a more convenient and less busy location for turning back electric trains to Mineola – a service since made redundant by subsequent extensions of the electrification to Hicksville and points east.

The canopies surrounding the station house began to sag by 1960. That same year, the LIRR considered closing both the East Williston station and the Albertson station, and combining the two stations in between the current existing ones; the project also would have eliminated the grade crossing with Hillside Avenue (NY 25B), adjacent to the station. However, after a great deal of community opposition, those plans were shelved, both existing stations remained open, and the East Williston station house's canopies were restored between 1965 and 1966.

High level platforms were added to the station in December 1982. These projects did little to keep the station house in stable condition, and it was closed on December 10, 1996. Since then, it has operated as little more than a pair of sheltered high-level platforms with ticket vending machines and accessible ramps. Efforts to preserve the original station house failed when it was found to be too structurally unstable, and it was razed on December 11, 2004. Some in the community have been considering building a whole new version of the original station house, but have instead opted for a decorative open-air shelter.

== Station layout ==
The station has two high-level side platforms, each long enough to accommodate 10 train cars.

Platform A, side platform
Track 1	← Oyster Bay Branch toward Long Island City or Penn Station (Mineola)
Track 2	Oyster Bay Branch toward Oyster Bay (Albertson) →
Platform B, side platform

== See also ==
- Hewlett station
- St. James station (LIRR)
