= New York's 19th State Assembly district =

American legislative district

Assemblymember
Ed Ra; R–Garden City South

New York's 19th State Assembly district is one of the 150 districts in the New York State Assembly. It has been represented by Republican Minority Leader Ed Ra since 2011.

== Geography ==
=== 2020s ===
District 19 is in Nassau County. It contains parts of the towns of Hempstead and North Hempstead, including most of Garden City, Garden City Park, East Williston, Mineola, New Hyde Park, Carle Place, Salisbury and West Hempstead and portions of Franklin Square and the village of Hempstead.

The district overlaps New York's 3rd and 4th congressional districts, and overlaps the 5th, 6th, 7th and 9th districts of the New York State Senate.

=== 2010s ===
District 19 is in Nassau County. It contains parts of the towns of Hempstead, North Hempstead and Oyster Bay, including most of Garden City, Garden City Park, East Williston, Mineola, New Hyde Park, and Carle Place and portions of Franklin Square, Old Westbury, Glen Head, West Hempstead and the village of Hempstead.

== Recent election results ==
=== 2026 ===
2026 New York State Assembly election, District 19
Party	Candidate	Votes	%
Republican	Ed Ra		
Conservative	Ed Ra		
Total	Ed Ra (incumbent)		
Democratic	Colleen Connaughton		
Write-in			
Total votes			

=== 2024 ===
2024 New York State Assembly election, District 19
Party	Candidate	Votes	%
Republican	Ed Ra	39,277	
Conservative	Ed Ra	3,588	
Total	Ed Ra (incumbent)	42,865	64.3
Democratic	Sanjeev Jindal	23,726	35.6
Write-in		88	0.1
Total votes		66,679	100.0
Republican hold			

=== 2022 ===
2022 New York State Assembly election, District 19
Party	Candidate	Votes	%
Republican	Ed Ra	30,948	
Conservative	Ed Ra	2,960	
Total	Ed Ra (incumbent)	33,908	66.4
Democratic	Sanjeev Jindal	17,141	33.6
Write-in		14	0.0
Total votes		51,063	100.0
Republican hold			

=== 2020 ===
2020 New York State Assembly election, District 19
Party	Candidate	Votes	%
Republican	Ed Ra	34,377	
Conservative	Ed Ra	3,264	
Independence	Ed Ra	615	
Libertarian	Ed Ra	253	
Total	Ed Ra (incumbent)	38,509	58.9
Democratic	Gary Port	26,831	41.1
Write-in		20	0.0
Total votes		65,360	100.0
Republican hold			

=== 2018 ===
2018 New York State Assembly election, District 19
Party	Candidate	Votes	%
Republican	Ed Ra	23,362	
Conservative	Ed Ra	2,455	
Independence	Ed Ra	348	
Reform	Ed Ra	101	
Total	Ed Ra (incumbent)	26,266	55.5
Democratic	Billy Carr	20,349	
Working Families	Billy Carr	456	
Women's Equality	Billy Carr	278	
Total	Billy Carr	21,083	44.5
Write-in		14	0.0
Total votes		47,363	100.0
Republican hold			

=== 2016 ===
2016 New York State Assembly election, District 19
Party	Candidate	Votes	%
Republican	Ed Ra	30,239	
Conservative	Ed Ra	3,399	
Independence	Ed Ra	691	
Tax Revolt Party	Ed Ra	221	
Reform	Ed Ra	98	
Total	Ed Ra (incumbent)	34,648	61.6
Democratic	Gary Port	20,394	
Working Families	Gary Port	789	
Women's Equality	Gary Port	428	
Total	Gary Port	21,611	38.4
Write-in		27	0.0
Total votes		56,286	100.0
Republican hold			

=== 2014 ===
2014 New York State Assembly election, District 19
Party	Candidate	Votes	%
Republican	Ed Ra	17,704	
Conservative	Ed Ra	2,646	
Independence	Ed Ra	699	
Tax Revolt Party	Ed Ra	145	
Total	Ed Ra (incumbent)	21,194	69.0
Democratic	Gary Port	8,698	
Working Families	Gary Port	823	
Total	Gary Port	9,521	31.0
Write-in		9	0.0
Total votes		30,724	100.0
Republican hold			

=== 2012 ===
2012 New York State Assembly election, District 19
Party	Candidate	Votes	%
Republican	Ed Ra	24,436	
Conservative	Ed Ra	3,277	
Independence	Ed Ra	861	
Tax Revolt Party	Ed Ra	225	
Total	Ed Ra (incumbent)	28,799	62.1
Democratic	Gary Port	17,599	37.9
Write-in		10	0.0
Total votes		46,408	100.0
Republican hold			
