= New York State Route 25B =

Highway on Long Island, New York

New York State Route 25B
- Map of Long Island with NY 25B highlighted in red

Route information
- Auxiliary route of NY 25
- Maintained by NYSDOT, Nassau County and NYCDOT
- Length: 7.25 mi (11.67 km)
- Existed: c. 1935–present

Major junctions
- West end: NY 25 in Bellerose
- Cross Island Parkway in Bellerose
- East end: NY 25 in Westbury

Location
- Country: United States
- State: New York
- Counties: Queens, Nassau

Highway system
- New York Highways; Interstate; US; State; Reference; Parkways
← NY 25A	→ NY 25C

New York State Route 25B (NY 25B) is a 7.25-mile (11.67 km) east–west state highway located on Long Island in New York, United States. The western terminus of the route is at an intersection with NY 25 in Queens. The eastern terminus is at an interchange with NY 25 in Westbury, Nassau County. NY 25B is named Hillside Avenue for its entire length, except for a 0.69-mile (1.11 km) portion in the village of East Williston, where it is called East Williston Avenue and owned & maintained by Nassau County as the unsigned County Route 85.

The route, assigned in the mid-1930s, acts as a northern alternate to NY 25, running parallel to its parent for its entire length. Unlike NY 25, which is four lanes wide for most of its length between Queens and Westbury, NY 25B has a number of lane configurations, including six lanes in Queens, four lanes in western Nassau County, and two lanes in East Williston. The route also connects NY 25 to the villages of Williston Park and East Williston.

== Route description ==
NY 25B is maintained by the New York City Department of Transportation (NYCDOT) within Queens and by Nassau County within the village of East Williston, where the route is co-designated but not signed as County Route 85. The remainder of the route is state-maintained.

=== Queens ===
Hillside Avenue changes designations from NY 25 to NY 25B at an intersection with Braddock Avenue in the Queens neighborhood of Queens Village. Here, NY 25 turns right onto Braddock while NY 25B begins and follows Hillside Avenue to the northeast. The road, a six-lane divided highway with a large, tree-lined median in the vicinity of the junction with Braddock Avenue, begins to narrow after intersecting 229th Street, passing the Martin Van Buren High School as the median is reduced to a single turning lane. At 232nd Street, the street turns to the east for three blocks before curving to the southeast at Winchester Boulevard.

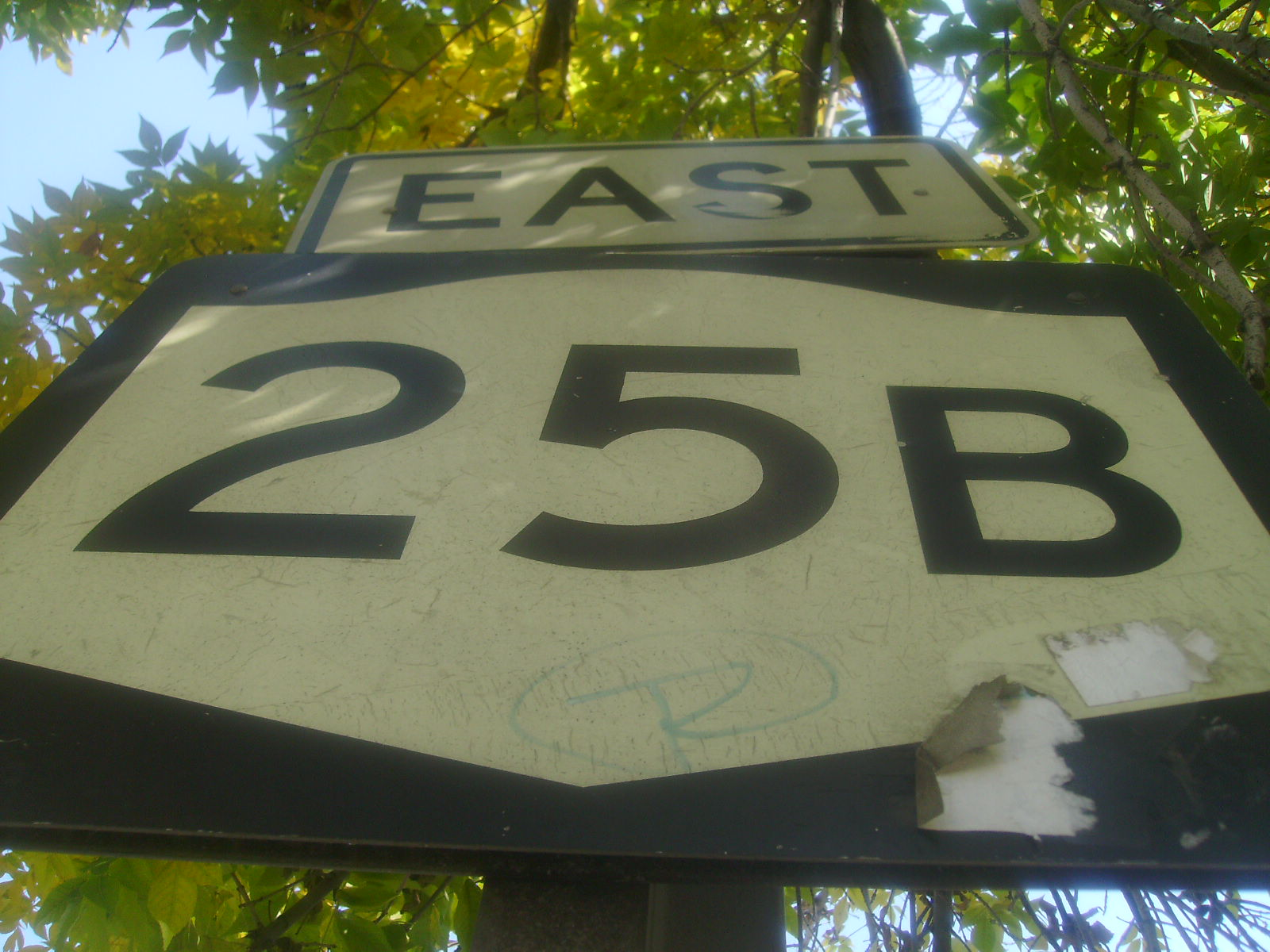
Fading NY 25B shield in Queens

The lane composition of NY 25B remains the same as it proceeds eastward through heavily residential areas of Queens, maintaining a width of six lanes with a turning lane acting as the divider between opposing traffic. Roughly 0.6 miles (1.0 km) from Winchester Boulevard, NY 25B, facing northeast once more, intersects the west (southbound) frontage road of the Cross Island Parkway in Bellerose. Shortly after passing over the six-lane parkway, Hillside Avenue meets the eastern (northbound) frontage road. East of the parkway and surrounded by homes once again, NY 25B heads northeast on a linear path for a half-mile to an intersection with the Little Neck Parkway. Upon crossing the parkway, the structures along Hillside Avenue shift from residential to commercial, a trend that remains in place to the Nassau County line.

=== Nassau County ===
At the county line, NY 25B breaks from its previous east-northeast alignment and takes a more pronounced northeast routing through New Hyde Park. The road narrows as well, decreasing to four lanes excluding the center turning lane, with an extended shoulder taking the place of the two lost lanes. A half-mile from the county line, NY 25B enters North New Hyde Park, intersecting Lakeville Road in the center. Two blocks from Lakeville, the commercial buildings give way to residential dwellings for seven blocks before returning at the intersection of New Hyde Park Road and Hillside Avenue.

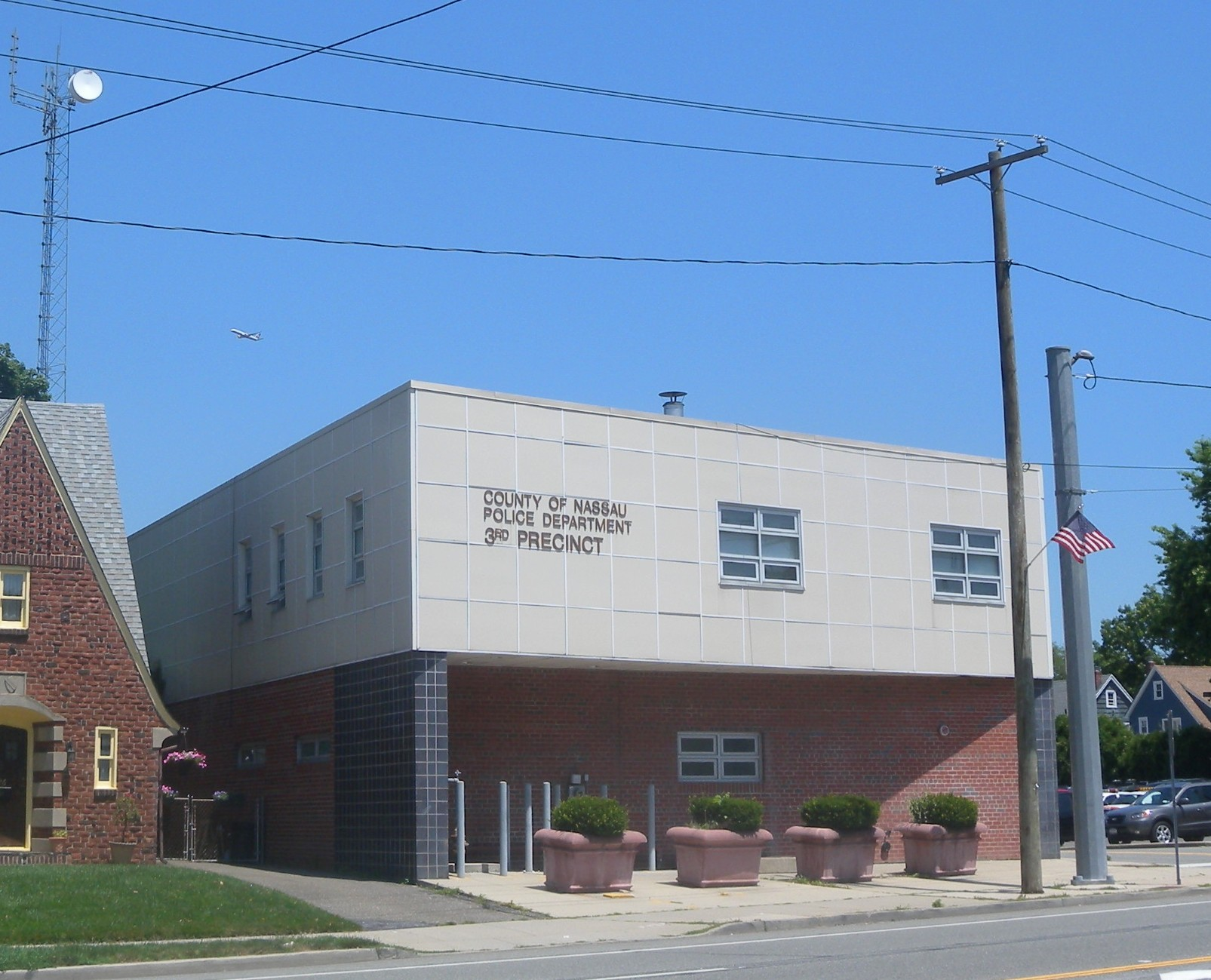
Nassau County police station along NY 25B in Williston Park

Past New Hyde Park Road, the buildings surrounding NY 25B become a balanced mix of commercial and residential structures. Less than a quarter of a mile from New Hyde Park Road, the road makes a turn eastward, passing to the north of the Hillside Public Library as it curves to the right. After three blocks of homes, a flurry of businesses precede a junction with Marcus Avenue, formerly part of NY 25C. The commercial presence continues for two blocks eastward before shifting back to residential structures. The four-lane NY 25B, along with a separate, parallel Hillside Avenue South, continue eastward through blocks of primarily homes to Herricks Road, where the composition of structures along NY 25B becomes a mix of commercial buildings and residential dwellings once more. Hillside Avenue continues on, entering Williston Park. On the eastern edge of the village, NY 25B narrows to two lanes as it crosses the Oyster Bay Branch of the Long Island Rail Road and enters East Williston, where the surroundings shift to residential for the final time.

In the center of the village, NY 25B intersects Roslyn Road before passing by the North Side School two blocks to the east. Roughly a half-mile from the school, NY 25B enters the village of Old Westbury and passes over the eight-lane Northern State Parkway with no connection between the two. The missing link is filled by way of Glen Cove Road, which NY 25B intersects a mere 150 yards (140 m) from the parkway, and Jericho Turnpike (NY 25), accessible via Glen Cove Road. East of Glen Cove Road, NY 25B enters Westbury and begins to develop a large median in preparation for an interchange with NY 25 roughly 0.3 miles (0.5 km) to the east. Just west of the interchange, NY 25B intersects Bacon Road. 100 yards (91 m) from the intersection, NY 25B crosses over NY 25 west and enters the median of NY 25 prior to merging with NY 25 east, ending the NY 25B designation.

== History ==
New York City did not have posted routes until mid-December 1934. Several routes that had ended at the eastern city line (the Queens–Nassau County border), such as NY 25, were extended westward at this time. By the following year, NY 25B was assigned to the portion of Hillside Avenue between Braddock Avenue in Queens and Jericho Turnpike in Westbury, serving as a northerly alternate route of NY 25 between the two locations. The alignment of the route has not been changed since that time. The junction at the east end of the route was originally an at-grade intersection. It was reconfigured into an interchange c. 1967.

== Major intersections ==
County	Location	mi	km	Destinations	Notes
Queens	Bellerose	0.00	0.00	NY 25 (Hillside Avenue / Braddock Avenue)	Western terminus
Queens	Bellerose	1.20	1.93	Cross Island Parkway – Verrazano Bridge, Whitestone Bridge	Exit 28A on Cross Island Parkway
Nassau	Old Westbury	6.79	10.93	To NY 25 / Northern State Parkway	Access via Glen Cove Road
Nassau	Westbury	7.25	11.67	NY 25 east to Northern State Parkway east – Jericho	Eastern terminus
1.000 mi = 1.609 km; 1.000 km = 0.621 mi

== County Route 85 ==
County Route 85
- East Williston Avenue
- Location: East Williston
- Length: 0.69 mi (1,110 m)

County Route 85 is a 0.69-mile (1.11 km) county road known as East Williston Road, located entirely within the Incorporated Village of East Williston, in Nassau County, New York, United States.

CR 85 consists of the portion of New York State Route 25B owned by Nassau County and maintained by the Nassau County Department of Public Works.

=== Route description ===
County Route 85 begins at NY 25B's grade crossing at the East Williston station on the Long Island Rail Road's Oyster Bay Branch – the location of the border between East Williston and Williston Park; west of this grade crossing, NY 25B is owned and maintained by the New York State Department of Transportation (NYSDOT). From there, it travels east through the Village of East Williston, soon intersecting High Street. It continues east from there and soon reaches a signalized intersection with Roslyn Road (CR 7A). From there, it continues east, soon reaching an intersection with Congress Avenue before passing the East Williston Union Free School District's North Side School. It continues east from there, shortly thereafter reaching the border between East Williston and Mineola; the CR 85 designation and Nassau County ownership and maintenance terminate at this location, with NY 25B reverting back to NYSDOT ownership and maintenance.

== Transportation ==
Hillside Avenue is served by several routes of MTA and NICE bus. The Q1, Q2, Q3, Q17, Q20, Q24, Q30, Q31, Q36, Q43, Q56, Q60, Q75, Q76, Q77, Q82, QM68, n1, n6, n6x, n22, n22x, n24, n26 buses run via Hillside Av.

== See also ==
- List of county routes in Nassau County, New York
