= Ed Ra =

American politician

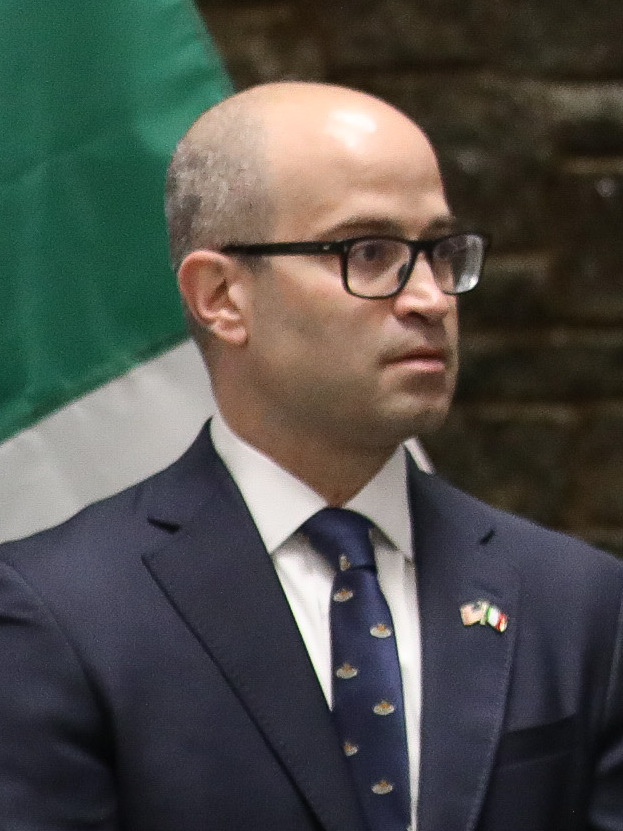
- Ra in 2024

Minority Leader of the New York State Assembly
- Incumbent
- Assumed office February 9, 2026
- Preceded by: William A. Barclay

Member of the New York State Assembly from the 19th district
- Incumbent
- Assumed office January 1, 2011
- Preceded by: Thomas Alfano

Personal details
- Born: November 4, 1981 (age 44) Mineola, New York, U.S.
- Party: Republican
- Education: Loyola University Maryland (BA); St. John's University (JD); Yeshiva University (LLM)

Edward P. Ra (born November 4, 1981) is an American politician from the state of New York. He represents New York's 19th State Assembly district, which includes portions of the towns of Hempstead, North Hempstead and Oyster Bay in Nassau County on Long Island. A Republican, Ra was first elected to the New York State Assembly in 2010. He became the minority leader of the Assembly in February 2026.

== Early life and education ==
Edward P. Ra was born in Mineola, New York and raised in Franklin Square, New York. He earned a B.A. in computer science from Loyola College in 2004. He received his Juris Doctor from St. John's University School of Law in 2007 and LL.M. in Intellectual Property Law from Benjamin N. Cardozo School of Law in 2008.

== Career ==
Prior to entering elected office, Ra served as the deputy town attorney for the Town of Hempstead. He was also a legal aide in the Office of the New York State Attorney General.

In 2010, Assemblyman Thomas Alfano decided not to seek reelection, and Ra entered the race to succeed him. Ra defeated Democrat Patrick Nicolosi in November 2010. In 2018, Ra defeated Democrat Bill Carr 55% to 45%; at the time, this was his closest race since the 2010 election.

Ra has served as ranking minority member of the Assembly Ways and Means Committee. Previously, he served as assistant minority leader pro tempore and also as ranking member of the Assembly Education Committee.

He has opposed congestion pricing in New York City, proposing a bill that would require the Legislature to approve any tolls charged at New York City's tunnels and bridges.

Ra was unanimously elected minority leader of the New York State Assembly on February 9, 2026. He replaced Will Barclay, who had resigned the post.

== Personal life ==
Ra lives in Garden City South, New York with his wife, Laura.

New York State Assembly
Preceded by William A. Barclay	Minority Leader of the New York Assembly; 2026–present	Incumbent
