= National Register of Historic Places listings in North Hempstead (town), New York =

This is a list of all National Register of Historic Places listings in the Town of North Hempstead, New York. The locations of National Register properties for which the latitude and longitude coordinates are included below, may be seen using an online map.

== Listings ==
	Name on the Register	Image	Date listed	Location	City or town	Description
1	William Barstow Mansion		August 29, 2014 (#14000539)	300 Steamboat Rd. 40°48′54″N 73°45′45″W	Kings Point	Gilded Age mansion built by founder of Kings Point and electricity pioneer now used as American Merchant Marine Museum
2	Cedarmere-Clayton Estates	Cedarmere-Clayton Estates	September 29, 1986 (#86002634)	Bryant Avenue and Northern Boulevard; 40°48′36″N 73°38′22″W	Roslyn Harbor	Home of William Cullen Bryant and, later, Childs Frick; now part of the Nassau County Museum of Art
3	Clapham-Stern House	Clapham-Stern House	June 10, 2005 (#05000570)	48 Glenwood Road; 40°49′15″N 73°38′49″W	Roslyn Harbor	
4	Clifton	Clifton	July 22, 1999 (#99000874)	355 Bryant Avenue; 40°48′44″N 73°38′51″W	Roslyn Harbor	
5	Cornell-Van Nostrand House	Cornell-Van Nostrand House	August 28, 2007 (#07000863)	New Hyde Park Road and Marcus Avenue; 40°45′33″N 73°41′15″W	New Hyde Park	
6	George W. Denton House	George W. Denton House	August 29, 1985 (#85001937)	West Shore Road; 40°48′16″N 73°39′19″W	Flower Hill	
7	Thomas Dodge Homestead	Thomas Dodge Homestead	June 26, 1986 (#86001387)	58 Harbor Road; 40°50′20″N 73°41′51″W	Port Washington	
8	East Williston Village Historic District	East Williston Village Historic District	July 18, 1985 (#85001603)	Roughly bounded by East Williston Avenue, Roslyn Road, Atlanta Avenue, and Village Green; 40°45′28″N 73°38′18″W	East Williston	
9	Eastman Cottage	Eastman Cottage	October 2, 1986 (#86002635)	130 Mott Avenue; 40°48′09″N 73°39′16″W	Roslyn	
10	Execution Rocks Light Station	Execution Rocks Light Station	February 23, 2007 (#07000094)	In Long Island Sound, 0.9 mi. NNW of N end of Middle Neck Road in Sands Point, in Nassau County. 40°52′41″N 73°44′17″W	Port Washington	
11	Gould-Guggenheim Estate	Gould-Guggenheim Estate	September 29, 2006 (#06000881)	95 Middle Neck Road; 40°51′34″N 73°41′47″W	Sands Point	
12	Grace and Thomaston Buildings	Grace and Thomaston Buildings	December 14, 1978 (#78001865)	11 Middle Neck Road and 8 Bond Street; 40°47′15″N 73°43′40″W	Great Neck Plaza	
13	Greenridge-Arthur Williams House	Greenridge-Arthur Williams House	July 22, 1999 (#99000875)	875 Bryant Avenue; 40°49′00″N 73°37′49″W	Roslyn Harbor	
14	Hicks Lumber Company Store	Hicks Lumber Company Store	October 2, 1986 (#86002636)	1345 Old Northern Boulevard; 40°48′01″N 73°39′01″W	Roslyn	
15	William Landsberg House	William Landsberg House	August 18, 2014 (#14000490)	5 Tianderah Rd. 40°49′57″N 73°41′41″W	Baxter Estates	Home designed and lived in by NY Architect William Landsberg
16	Mackay Estate Dairyman's Cottage	Mackay Estate Dairyman's Cottage	March 14, 1991 (#91000238)	40 Elm Drive; 40°48′02″N 73°37′32″W	East Hills	
17	Mackay Estate Gate Lodge	Mackay Estate Gate Lodge	March 14, 1991 (#91000240)	Jct. of Harbor Hill and Roslyn Roads; 40°47′35″N 73°38′30″W	East Hills	
18	Mackay Estate Water Tower	Mackay Estate Water Tower	March 14, 1991 (#91000239)	Redwood Drive between Lincoln Drive and Lufberry Drive; 40°47′51″N 73°38′23″W	East Hills	
19	Main Street Historic District	Main Street Historic District	January 21, 1974 (#74001266)	Main Street from North Hempstead Turnpike to East Broadway, including Tower Street and portions of Glen Avenue and Paper Mill Road; 40°47′50″N 73°38′56″W	Roslyn	Mostly intact 18th- and 19th-century core of Roslyn
20	Main Street School	Main Street School	February 10, 1983 (#83001714)	Main and South Washington Streets; 40°49′50″N 73°41′48″W	Port Washington	
21	Manhasset Monthly Meeting of the Society of Friends	Manhasset Monthly Meeting of the Society of Friends	September 9, 2009 (#09000700)	1421 Northern Boulevard; 40°47′37″N 73°41′40″W	Manhasset	
22	Monfort Cemetery	Monfort Cemetery	January 7, 1988 (#87002301)	E of Main Street and Port Washington Boulevard; 40°49′52″N 73°40′57″W	Port Washington	Cemetery with remains of some early settlers of Cow Neck area.
23	Mudge Farmhouse	Mudge Farmhouse	July 22, 1999 (#99000876)	535 Motts Cove Road South; 40°48′55″N 73°38′13″W	Roslyn Harbor	
24	North Hempstead Town Hall	North Hempstead Town Hall	December 20, 2006 (#06001143)	220 Plandome Road; 40°47′44″N 73°41′56″W	Manhasset	
25	Old Westbury Gardens	Old Westbury Gardens	November 8, 1976 (#76001234)	71 Old Westbury Road; 40°46′26″N 73°35′47″W	Old Westbury	
26	Horatio Gates Onderdonk House	Horatio Gates Onderdonk House	April 16, 1980 (#80002661)	1471 Northern Boulevard; 40°47′38″N 73°41′33″W	Manhasset	
27	Rescue Hook & Ladder Company No. 1 Firehouse	Rescue Hook & Ladder Company No. 1 Firehouse	May 6, 1991 (#91000480)	Jct. of School Street and Skillman Street; 40°48′10″N 73°38′48″W	Roslyn	
28	Roslyn Cemetery	Roslyn Cemetery	October 28, 1991 (#91001534)	Northern Boulevard, W of jct. with Glen Cove Road; 40°48′33″N 73°37′56″W	Greenvale	
29	Roslyn Grist Mill	Roslyn Grist Mill	October 2, 1986 (#86002638)	1347 Old Northern Boulevard; 40°48′01″N 73°39′00″W	Roslyn	One of the few remaining Dutch colonial commercial frame buildings in U.S.
30	Roslyn House	Roslyn House	June 7, 1990 (#90000880)	Jct. of Lincoln Avenue and Roslyn Road; 40°47′31″N 73°38′28″W	Roslyn Heights	
31	Roslyn National Bank and Trust Company Building	Roslyn National Bank and Trust Company Building	October 2, 1986 (#86002639)	1432 Old Northern Boulevard; 40°48′06″N 73°38′49″W	Roslyn	
32	Roslyn Savings Bank Building	Roslyn Savings Bank Building	October 2, 1986 (#86002640)	1400 Old Northern Boulevard; 40°48′03″N 73°38′52″W	Roslyn	
33	Roslyn Village Historic District	Roslyn Village Historic District	April 15, 1987 (#86002650)	Roughly bounded by Old Northern Boulevard, Vernon and East Broadway Streets, Main, Glen Avenue, and Tower Street; 40°47′49″N 73°38′54″W	Roslyn	Later 19th-century western and commercial portion of Roslyn
34	Saddle Rock Grist Mill	Saddle Rock Grist Mill	December 27, 1978 (#78001866)	Grist Mill Lane and Little Neck Bay; 40°47′51″N 73°45′05″W	Saddle Rock	
35	Saint Mary's Chapel	Saint Mary's Chapel	April 6, 2005 (#05000270)	Rushmore Avenue bet Roslyn Avenue and Glen Cove Avenue; 40°45′04″N 73°36′35″W	Carle Place	
36	Sands Family Cemetery		March 12, 1992 (#92000092)	Off Sands Point Road just S of jct. with Middle Neck Road; 40°51′29″N 73°43′24″W	Sands Point	
37	Sands-Willets Homestead	Sands-Willets Homestead	September 19, 1985 (#85002425)	336 Port Washington Boulevard; 40°48′56″N 73°40′51″W	Flower Hill	Headquarters of the Cow Neck Peninsula Historical Society.
38	Almeron and Olive Smith House	Almeron and Olive Smith House	July 12, 2006 (#06000569)	50 South Drive; 40°48′23″N 73°42′11″W	Plandome	
39	Stephen and Charles Smith House	Stephen and Charles Smith House	July 22, 1999 (#99000873)	450 Bryant Avenue; 40°48′47″N 73°38′45″W	Roslyn Harbor	
40	John Philip Sousa House	John Philip Sousa House	October 15, 1966 (#66000532)	14 Hicks Lane, Sands Point; 40°50′35″N 73°43′47″W	Port Washington	Home of John Philip Sousa, bandleader and composer of memorable marches, from 1915 to his death
41	Springbank	Springbank	September 9, 1999 (#99001128)	440 Bryant Avenue; 40°48′46″N 73°38′45″W	Roslyn Harbor	
42	Stepping Stones Light Station	Stepping Stones Light Station	September 15, 2005 (#05001026)	Long Island Sound, 0.9 mi. NW of Elm Point in the Incorporated Village of Kings Point; 40°49′27″N 73°46′30″W	Kings Point	
43	Willet Titus House	Willet Titus House	October 2, 1986 (#86002652)	1441 Old Northern Boulevard; 40°48′11″N 73°38′50″W	Roslyn	
44	Toll Gate House	Toll Gate House	August 16, 1977 (#77000952)	Northern Boulevard; 40°48′31″N 73°37′56″W	Greenvale	
45	Trinity Church Complex	Trinity Church Complex	October 2, 1986 (#86002653)	Northern Boulevard; 40°48′18″N 73°38′44″W	Roslyn	
46	United States Merchant Marine Academy	United States Merchant Marine Academy	August 29, 2014 (#14000538)	300 Steamboat Road; 40°48′44″N 73°45′48″W	Kings Point	Training site for members of the U.S. Merchant Marine since 1943
47	US Post Office-Great Neck	US Post Office-Great Neck	May 11, 1989 (#88002526)	1 Welwyn Road; 40°47′14″N 73°43′23″W	Great Neck Plaza	
48	US Post Office-Mineola	US Post Office-Mineola	May 11, 1989 (#88002354)	Main and First Streets; 40°44′35″N 73°38′21″W	Mineola	Only federal project designed by Peabody, Wilson & Brown, and rare New Deal post office without public art in lobby.
49	Valley Road Historic District		April 8, 1977 (#77000953)	S of Manhasset on Community Drive; 40°46′27″N 73°42′14″W	Manhasset	
50	Samuel Adams Warner House	Samuel Adams Warner House	October 2, 1986 (#86002654)	1 Railroad Avenue; 40°47′34″N 73°38′39″W	Roslyn	
51	Willowmere	Willowmere	July 22, 1999 (#99000872)	435 Bryant Avenue; 40°48′55″N 73°38′48″W	Roslyn Harbor	

== See also ==
- National Register of Historic Places listings in New York
- National Register of Historic Places listings in Nassau County, New York
