= Bryant Avenue =

County highway in Nassau County, New York

County Route C26
- Bryant Avenue
- CR C26, highlighted in red

Route information
- Maintained by NCDPW
- Length: 1.85 mi (2.98 km)

Major junctions
- South end: Old Northern Boulevard (CR C65) in Roslyn
- North end: Glen Cove Avenue (CR C91) and Plaza Road in Roslyn Harbor

Location
- Country: United States
- State: New York
- County: Nassau

Highway system
- County routes in New York; County Routes in Nassau County

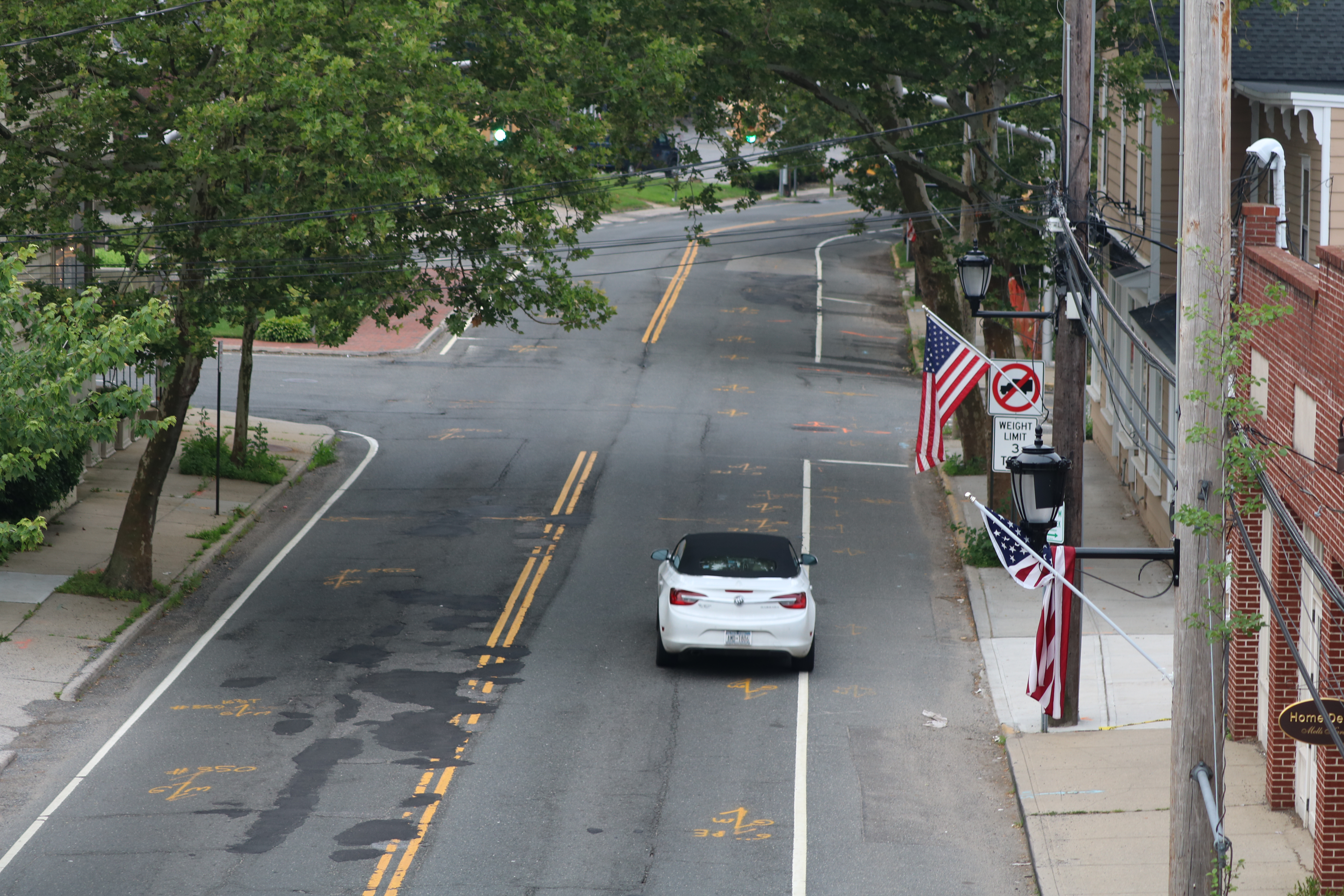
The southern terminus Bryant Avenue, as seen from the William Cullen Bryant Viaduct in Roslyn in 2018.

Bryant Avenue is a major, 1.85-mile (2.98 km) county road in Nassau County, on Long Island, New York. It connects the Incorporated Villages of Roslyn and Roslyn Harbor, serving as a major thoroughfare through both municipalities. The road, in its entirety, is owned and maintained by Nassau County, and is designated as the unsigned County Route C26.

== Route description ==
Bryant Avenue begins at Old Northern Boulevard (CR C65) in the heart of the Village of Roslyn. It travels north, soon crossing underneath the William Cullen Bryant Viaduct, which carries Northern Boulevard (NY 25A), before reaching an intersection with Wittes Lane. It than continues north into the Village of Roslyn Harbor. It then meanders its way north, passing Cedarmere, eventually reaching Glenwood Road (CR E25) and turning east. It then continues east to an intersection with Glen Cove Avenue (CR C91) and Plaza Road, where it terminates.

== History ==
Bryant Avenue is named for American poet William Cullen Bryant. Bryant, a longtime Roslyn area resident, was a very influential member of the Roslyn community. His former estate, Cedarmere, is located off of Bryant Avenue within the Village of Roslyn Harbor and is now a public park, preserve, museum, and historic landmark.

The portion of Bryant Avenue between Old Northern Boulevard and Glenwood Road was formerly designated as part of CR 7, prior to the route numbers in Nassau County being altered – while the remaining portion was designated as CR 183; today, the Bryant Avenue. They, along with all of the other county routes in Nassau County, became unsigned in the 1970s, when Nassau County officials opted to remove the signs as opposed to allocating the funds for replacing them with new ones that met the latest federal design standards and requirements, as per the federal government's Manual on Uniform Traffic Control Devices. Today, Bryant Avenue, in its entirety, is designated as County Route C26.

=== Landmarks ===
Several landmarked properties listed on the National Register of Historic Places are located along Bryant Avenue. These properties include Cedarmere, Clifton, Springbank, the Stephen and Charles Smith House, and Willowmere.

== Major intersections ==
Location	mi	km	Destinations	Notes
Roslyn	0.00	0.00	Old Northern Boulevard (CR C65)	
Roslyn Harbor	1.02	1.64	Glenwood Road (CR C94)	
Roslyn Harbor	1.36	2.19	Motts Cove Road North	
Roslyn Harbor	1.42	2.29	Motts Cove Road South	Access to Roslyn Harbor Village Hall
Roslyn Harbor	1.85	2.98	Glen Cove Avenue (CR C91) / Plaza Road	Access to Greenvale LIRR station via Plaza Road
1.000 mi = 1.609 km; 1.000 km = 0.621 mi

== Notable people ==
Notable people who have lived along Bryant Avenue include:

- William Cullen Bryant – Poet and journalist; the person for whom Bryant Avenue is named. Bryant lived at Cedarmere, in Roslyn Harbor.
- Aaron Ward – Sailor and United States Navy officer who served in the Spanish–American War; lived at Willowmere, in Roslyn Harbor.
