= Greenridge-Arthur Williams House =

Historic house in Roslyn Harbor, New York, United States

- U.S. National Register of Historic Places
- New York State Register of Historic Places
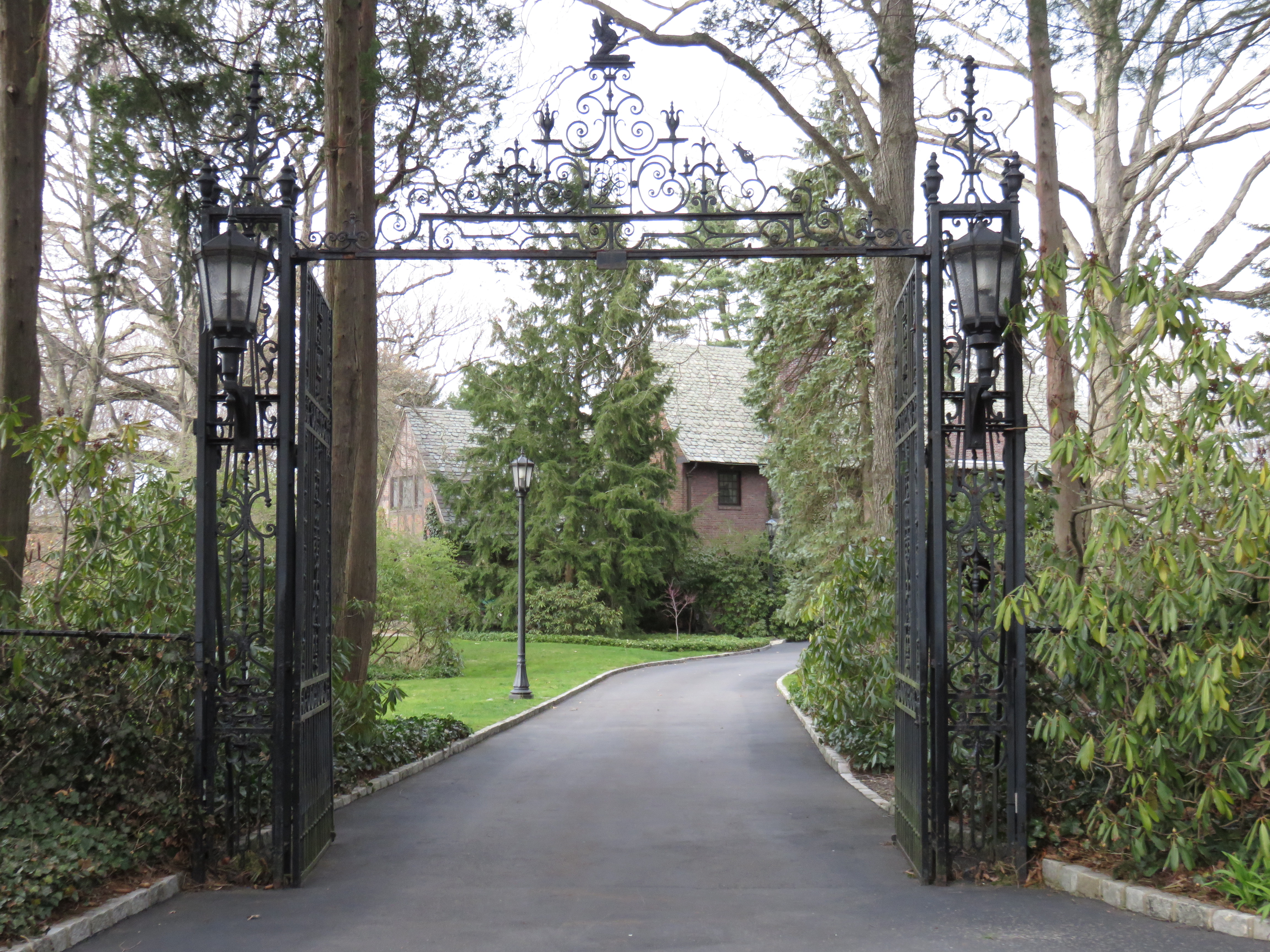
- The exterior of the mansion in 2016

- Location within New York Location within the United States
- Location: 875 Bryant Ave., Roslyn Harbor, New York
- Coordinates: 40°49′0″N 73°37′49″W
- Area: 3 acres (1.2 ha)
- Built: 1916
- Architect: Hartman, Harold Victor
- Architectural style: Late 19th And 20th Century Revivals
- MPS: Roslyn Harbor, New York MPS
- NRHP reference No.: 99000875

Significant dates
- Added to NRHP: July 22, 1999
- Designated NYSRHP: February 24, 1997

Greenridge-Arthur Williams House is a historic mansion located at 875 Bryant Avenue in the Village of Roslyn Harbor, in Nassau County, New York, United States.

== Description ==
The large, 2 1/2-story mansion is designed in the Jacobethan Revival–style. It is constructed of concrete and faced in red brick.

The house features a steeply pitched slate roof with projecting bays, gables, dormers, and deep eaves. A two-story, gable-roofed Great Hall wing has a stone clad foundation and terminates in a five-sided bay to the north. Also on the property is a contributing, former ice house.

On February 24, 1997, Greenridge-Arthur Williams House was listed on the New York State Register of Historic Places. It was subsequently also added to the National Register of Historic Places on July 22, 1999.

== See also ==
- National Register of Historic Places listings in North Hempstead (town), New York
- Cedarmere-Clayton Estates
- Willowmere
