= James F. Curtis (lawyer) =

American lawyer (1878–1952)

- Portrait of Curtis

United States Assistant Secretary of the Treasury
- In office November 27, 1909 – 1914
- President: William Howard Taft
- Preceded by: James Burton Reynolds
- Succeeded by: Charles S. Hamlin

Personal details
- Born: James Freeman Curtis; August 16, 1878 Manchester-by-the-Sea, Massachusetts, U.S.
- Died: November 23, 1952 (aged 74) Miami, Florida, U.S.
- Spouse(s): Laura Beatrice Merriam (m. 1912; div. 1924) (m. 1925; div. 1938) Eleanor Munroe (m. 1938)
- Relations: Harriot Curtis (sister); James F. Curtis (uncle)
- Children: 4
- Parent(s): Greely S. Curtis; Harriot Sumner Appleton
- Education: Harvard College; Harvard Law School

James Freeman Curtis (August 16, 1878 – November 23, 1952) was an American lawyer who served Assistant Secretary of the Treasury from 1909 until 1914.

== Early life ==
Curtis was born on August 16, 1878, in Manchester-by-the-Sea, Massachusetts, and was named for his paternal uncle, James F. Curtis. He was a son of Brig.-Gen. Greely Stevenson Curtis (1830–1897) and Harriot Sumner (née Appleton) Curtis (1841–1923). Among his siblings were Harriot Curtis, a prominent amateur golfer and skier.

He attended Harvard College, from which he graduated in 1899 and where he was an Intercollegiate golf champion. He also attended Harvard Law School, from which he graduated in 1903.

== Career ==
From 1903 to 1906, he was a member of the Boston law firm of Storey, Thorndike, Palmer & Thayer. From 1906 to 1909, he served as the Assistant District Attorney for Suffolk County, Massachusetts, to District Attorney Hill. In November 1909, he was appointed Assistant Secretary of the Treasury by Franklin MacVeagh, Secretary of the Treasury.

From 1914 to 1919, he served as counsel and deputy governor of the Federal Reserve Bank of New York. After which he became a partner in the New York law firm of Curtis, Belknap & Webb. He was senior partner in the firm until he retired to become counsel in 1947 when the Robert P. Patterson, former Secretary of War, joined the firm.

== Personal life ==
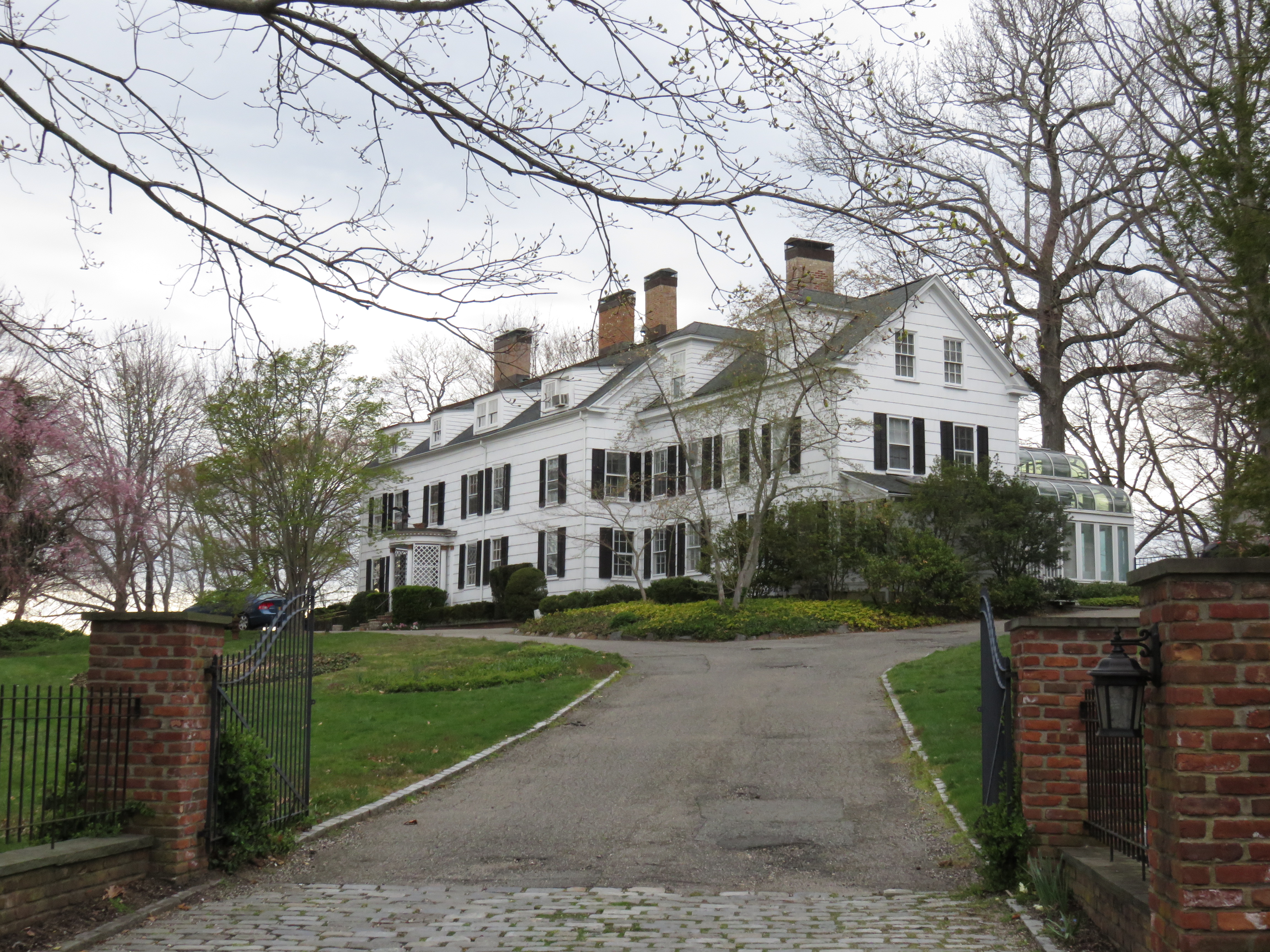
Willowmere in Roslyn Harbor, New York

In 1912, Curtis was married to Laura Beatrice Merriam (1892–1973), a daughter of the Governor of Minnesota William Rush Merriam and Laura Elizabeth (née Hancock) Merriam. Together, they had a home called Willowmere in Roslyn Harbor, New York, and were the parents of four children.

- Laura Elizabeth Curtis (1913–2003), who married George Herbert Bostwick, a son of Albert Carlton Bostwick, in 1933.
- James Freeman Curtis (1915–1945), who married Barbara Hope Gatins (1918–2017), a daughter of Benjamin Keiley Gatins, in 1938; he died in a plane crash.
- Frazier Curtis (1918–1942), a Harvard graduate who was killed in a plane accident.
- Pauline Curtis (1922–2001), who married Schuyler Hollingsworth.

Laura and James divorced in Paris in April 1924, however, thirteen months later they remarried in Washington, D.C. They divorced again in January 1938, after which she married John Messick Gross, a vice president of Bethlehem Steel, in July 1938. In September 1938, he married Eleanor (née Munroe) Green (1884–1967), daughter of the Henry Smith Munroe, Dean of the Columbia University School of Mines. Eleanor was the former wife of Walton Atwater Green, former prohibition investigator, stock broker and publisher from Boston.

He was a member of the Tavern Club, Harvard Club, Country Club, Tennis and Racquet Club of Boston, the Harvard Club of New York and the Metropolitan Club in Washington.

Curtis died at Jackson Memorial Hospital in Miami, Florida, on November 23, 1952.
