= Valley Road Historic District =

- U.S. National Register of Historic Places
- U.S. Historic district
- New York State Register of Historic Places
- Location within New York Location within the United States
- Location: Community Drive (Valley Road), Manhasset, New York
- Coordinates: 40°46′27″N 73°42′14″W
- Area: 5 acres (2.0 ha)
- Architect: Multiple
- NRHP reference No.: 77000953

Significant dates
- Added to NRHP: April 8, 1977
- Designated NYSRHP: June 23, 1980

The Valley Road Historic District is a national historic district located along Community Drive (historically known as Valley Road) in Manhasset, in Nassau County, New York.

== Description ==
The historic district includes six contributing and buildings and one contributing site. It includes the Lakeville A.M.E. Zion Church – one of Nassau County's oldest churches – and its cemetery.

The historic district is best known for its contributions to Long Island's and New York's African American history. Many freed African American slaves settled in the area following the abolition of slavery in New York State in 1827, with a prominent, thriving African American community quickly taking shape.

== History ==
The Valley Road Historic District was listed on the National Register of Historic Places on April 8, 1977. It was subsequently added to the New York State Register of Historic Places three years later, on June 23, 1980.

== See also ==
- National Register of Historic Places listings in North Hempstead (town), New York
