= Trinity Church Complex (Roslyn, New York) =

Historic church in New York, United States

- U.S. National Register of Historic Places
- New York State Register of Historic Places
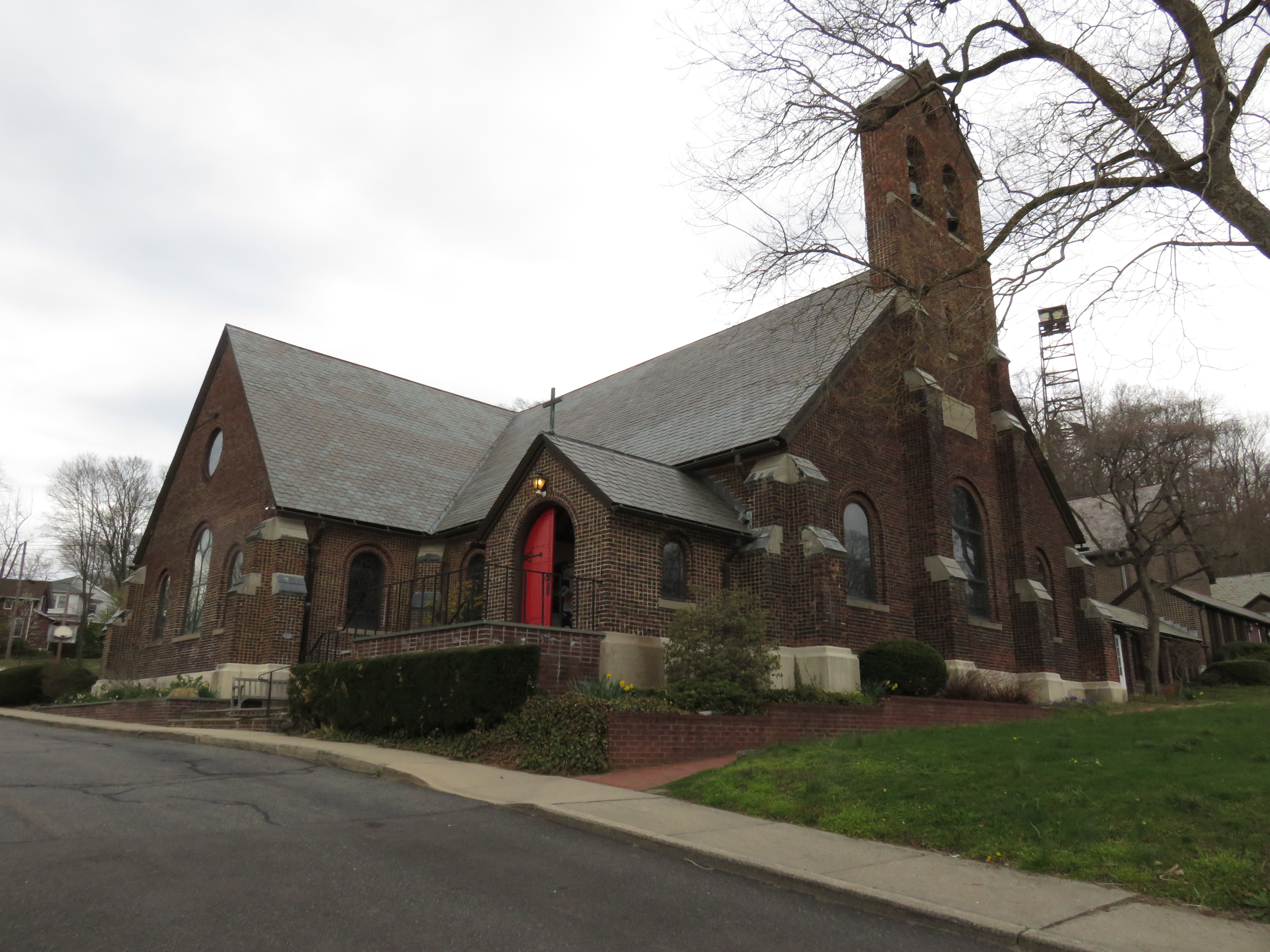
- The church in 2016

- Location within New York Location within the United States
- Location: 1579 Northern Boulevard, Roslyn, New York
- Coordinates: 40°48′18″N 73°38′44″W
- Area: 1 acre (0.40 ha)
- Built: 1906
- Architect: McKim, Mead & White
- Architectural style: Late 19th And 20th Century Revivals, Eclectic Medieval
- MPS: Roslyn Village MRA
- NRHP reference No.: 86002653

Significant dates
- Added to NRHP: October 02, 1986
- Designated NYSRHP: August 15, 1986

Trinity Church Complex is a historic church and school complex located off Northern Boulevard in Roslyn, New York, United States. It is located on the westbound off-ramp from the William Cullen Bryant Viaduct and Church Street – the latter of which also leads to the St. Mary's Roman Catholic Church of Roslyn, on the northeast corner of Bryant and Summit Avenues.

== Description ==
The Trinity Church Complex was built in 1906 by the architectural firm of McKim, Mead & White, and also includes the 1951-established Roslyn-Trinity Cooperative Day School. The church complex was added to both the National Register of Historic Places and the New York State Register of Historic Places in 1986.

In November 2016, the church opened a child care center at the complex.

== See also ==
- National Register of Historic Places listings in North Hempstead (town), New York
- Roslyn Village Historic District

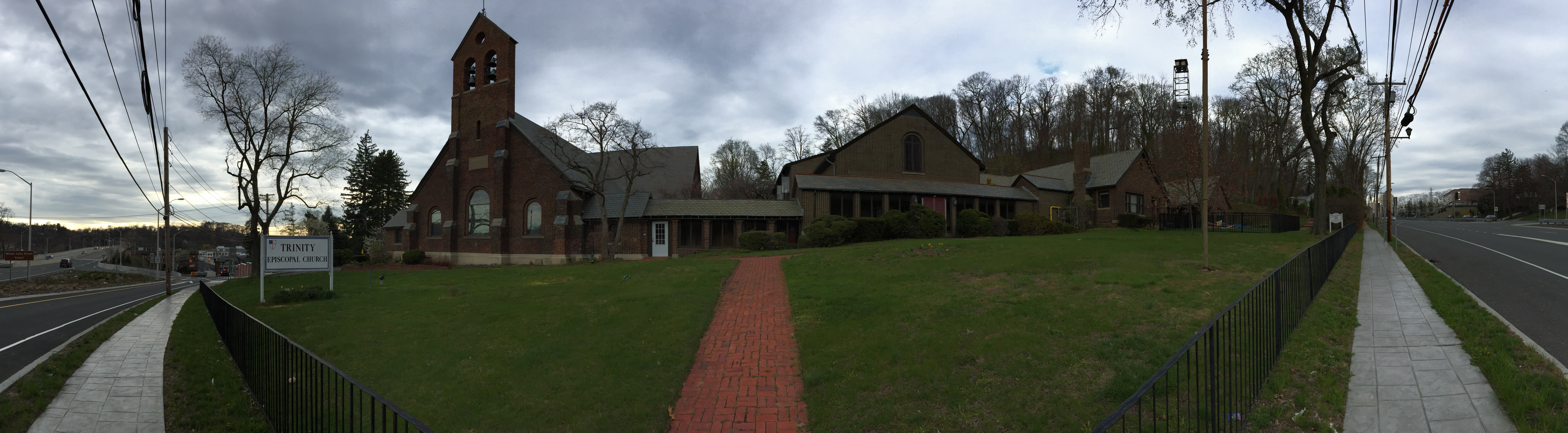
Panoramic image of the complex
