= Willowmere =

Home in Nassau County, New York, United States

- U.S. National Register of Historic Places
- New York State Register of Historic Places
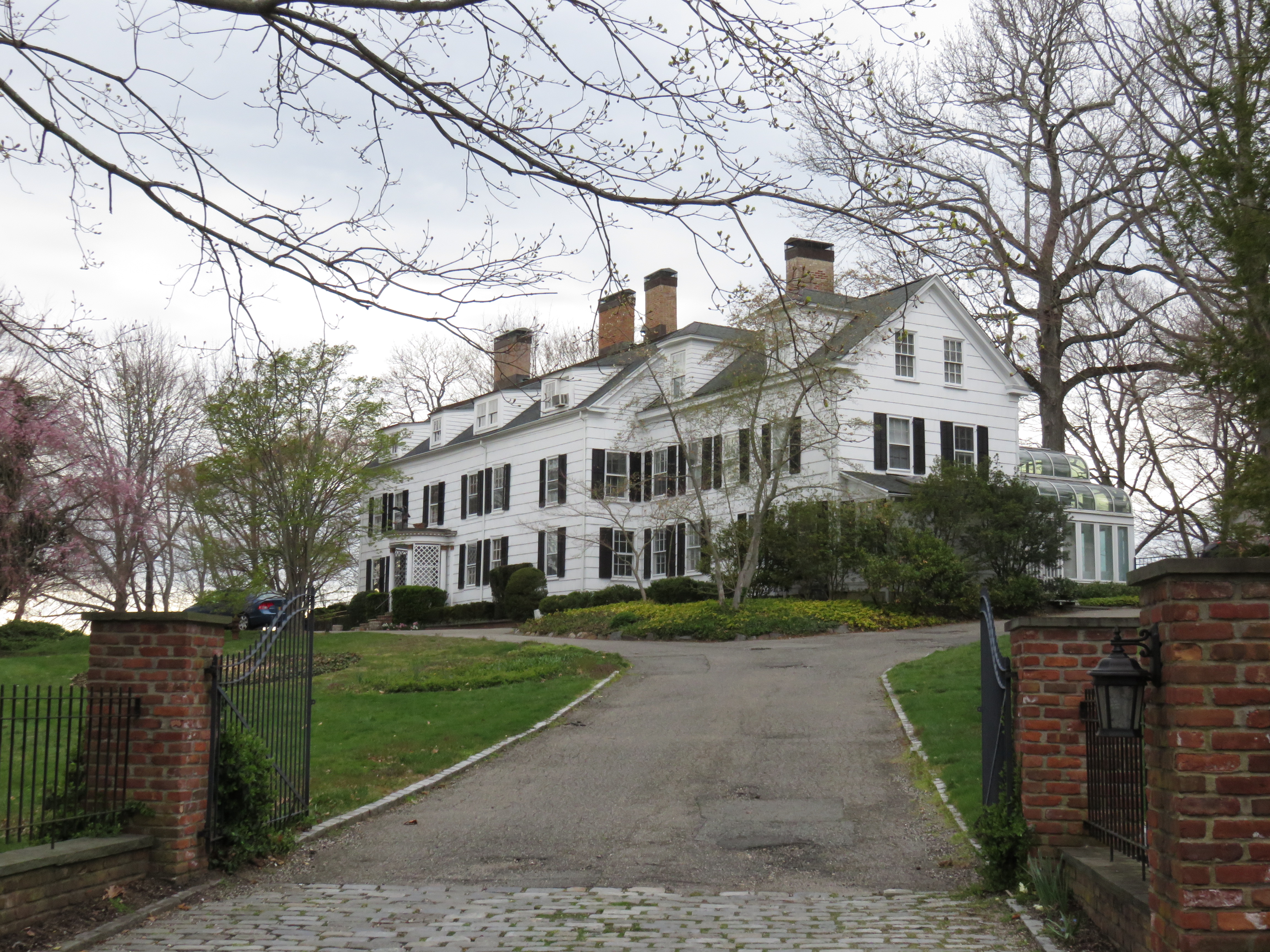
- The front of Willowmere, as seen in 2016

- Location within New York Location within the United States
- Location: 435 Bryant Ave., Roslyn Harbor, New York
- Coordinates: 40°48′55″N 73°38′48″W
- Area: 2.5 acres (1.0 ha)
- Built: 1750
- Architect: Peabody, Wilson & Brown
- Architectural style: Colonial Revival
- MPS: Roslyn Harbor, New York MPS
- NRHP reference No.: 99000872

Significant dates
- Added to NRHP: July 22, 1999
- Designated NYSRHP: February 24, 1997

Willowmere (also known as Pearsall House) is a historic mansion located at 435 Bryant Avenue in the Village of Roslyn Harbor, in Nassau County, New York, United States.

== Description ==
Willowmere was originally constructed around 1750 as a 2 1/2-story, gambrel-roofed dwelling with a five-bay front facade. It was expanded in 1893. It was the property of Admiral Aaron Ward (1851-1918) – a rose lover. The portico was added in 1926, when the house was renovated to the Colonial Revival style.

On February 24, 1997, Willowmere was listed on the New York State Register of Historic Places. It was subsequently also added to the National Register of Historic Places on July 22, 1999.

== See also ==
- National Register of Historic Places listings in North Hempstead (town), New York
- Cedarmere-Clayton Estates
- Greenridge-Arthur Williams House
