= Clapham-Stern House =

Historic house in New York, United States

- U.S. National Register of Historic Places
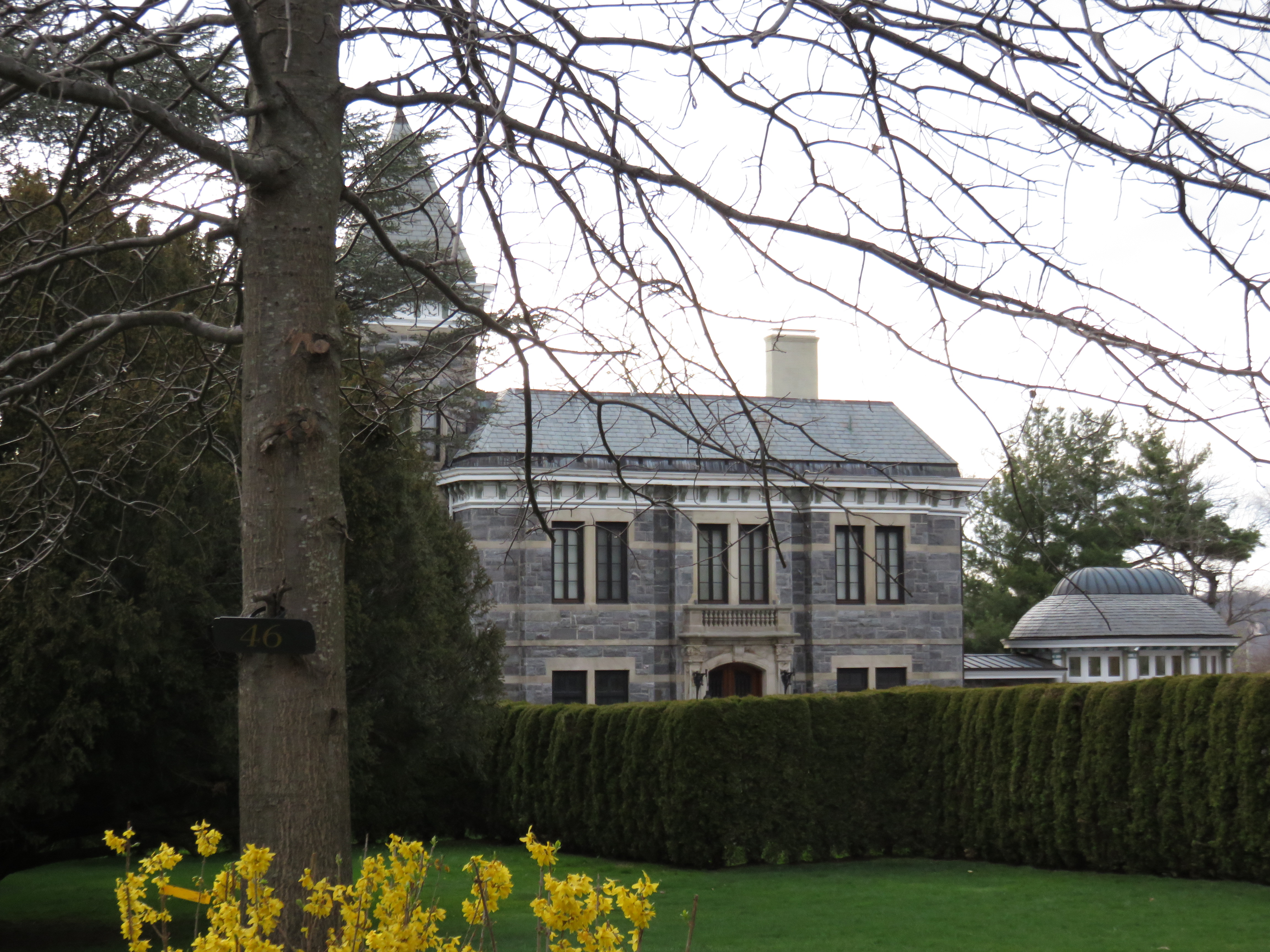

- Location within New York Location within the United States
- Location: 48 Glenwood Rd., Roslyn Harbor, New York
- Coordinates: 40°49′15″N 73°38′49″W
- Area: 2.1 acres (0.85 ha)
- Built: 1906
- Architect: Jacob Wrey Mould
- Architectural style: Gothic Revival
- MPS: Roslyn Harbor, New York MPS
- NRHP reference No.: 05000570
- Added to NRHP: June 10, 2005

The Clapham-Stern House – also known as Wenlo and originally as Stone House – is a historic mansion located within the Incorporated Village of Roslyn Harbor in Nassau County, New York.

== Description ==
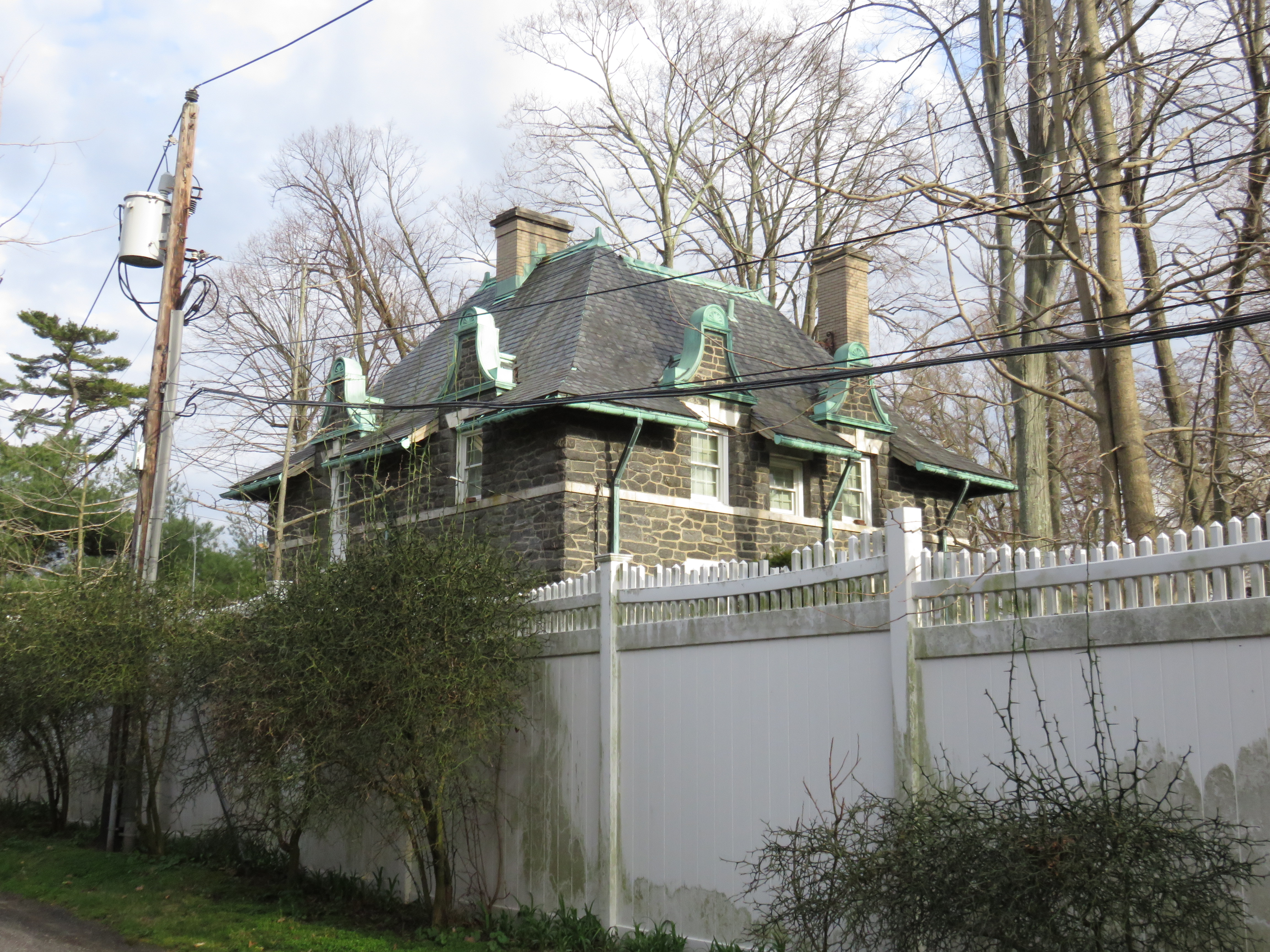
The former gardener's cottage near the entrance to the former estate

The house is an asymmetrical, 2 1/2-story dwelling that rests on a full basement. It consists of a main block with wings to the north and south, a tower, and a piazza wrapping around the south and west sides. It is constructed of rough-faced gray Greenwich granite accented by limestone. It has a moderately pitched hipped slate roof with copper cresting.

The property also contains a contributing bathhouse, dating to the 1920s.

== History ==
The house was originally built between 1868 and 1872 and turned into a premier estate in 1906 after being purchased by department store magnate Benjamin Stern.

After a major fire in 1960, the house was returned to a High Victorian Gothic style.

It was listed on the National Register of Historic Places in 2005.

== See also ==
- Clifton (Roslyn Harbor, New York)
