= James Burton Reynolds =

American politician (1870-1948)

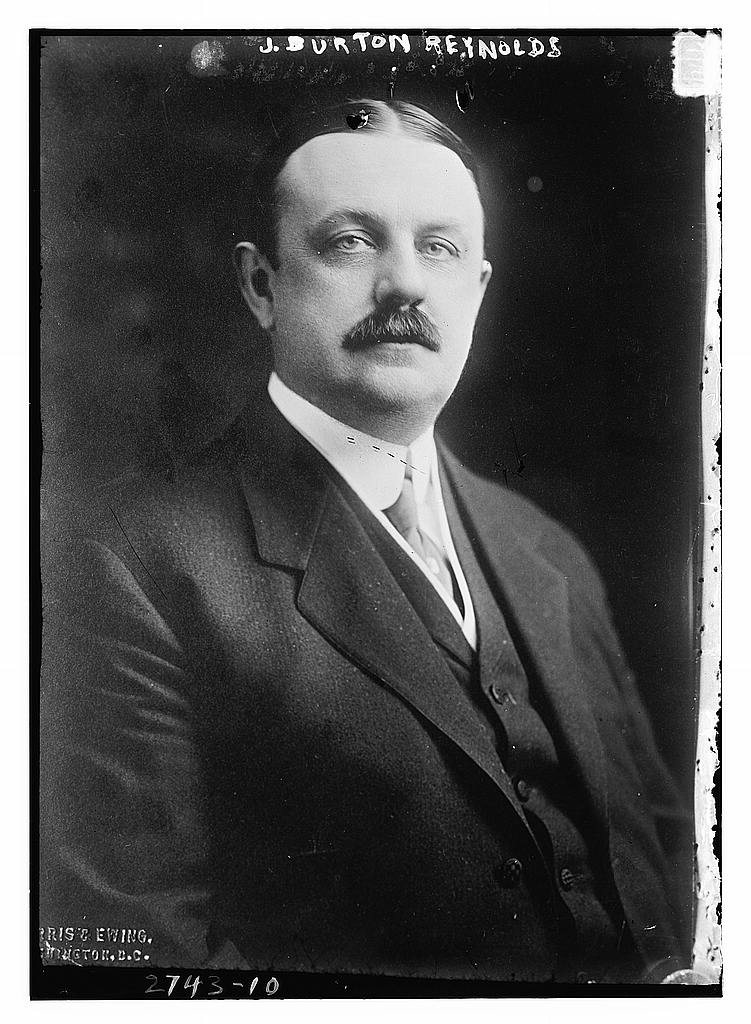
- Reynolds, c. 1913

United States Assistant Secretary of the Treasury
- In office 1905 – November 1, 1909
- President: Theodore Roosevelt; William Howard Taft
- Preceded by: Robert S. Armstrong
- Succeeded by: James Freeman Curtis

Personal details
- Born: February 17, 1870 Saratoga, New York
- Died: February 7, 1948 (aged 77) New York City, New York
- Spouse: Irene Holcombe Hearin (m. 1912; died 1943)
- Education: Dartmouth College

James Burton Reynolds (February 17, 1870 – February 7, 1948) was Assistant Secretary of the Treasury, where he was accused of taking bribes from the Sugar Trust.

== Early life ==
He was born in Saratoga, New York, on February 17, 1870, and was the son of Dr. John H. Reynolds and Sarah (née Morgan) Reynolds. He attended Glens Falls Academy and graduated from Dartmouth College in 1890.

== Career ==
In 1905, President Theodore Roosevelt appointed Reynolds an Assistant Secretary of the Treasury. In September 1909, Reynolds was appointed by President William Howard Taft. He resigned from the Treasury effective November 1, 1909, to focus on the Tariff Commission.

In 1913 he was Secretary of the Republican National Committee. In 1920 he was the campaign manager for Calvin Coolidge.

== Personal life ==
On December 28, 1912, Reynolds was married to Irene (née Holcombe) Hearin (1867–1943) in Mobile, Alabama. Irene, a daughter of Dr. James Mosely Holcombe and Rhidonia Alabama Augustine (née Hearin) Holcombe, was the widow of Charles Turner Hearin, with whom she had several children.

He died in New York City on February 7, 1948.
