= Roslyn Harbor, New York =

- Village
- Incorporated Village of Roslyn Harbor
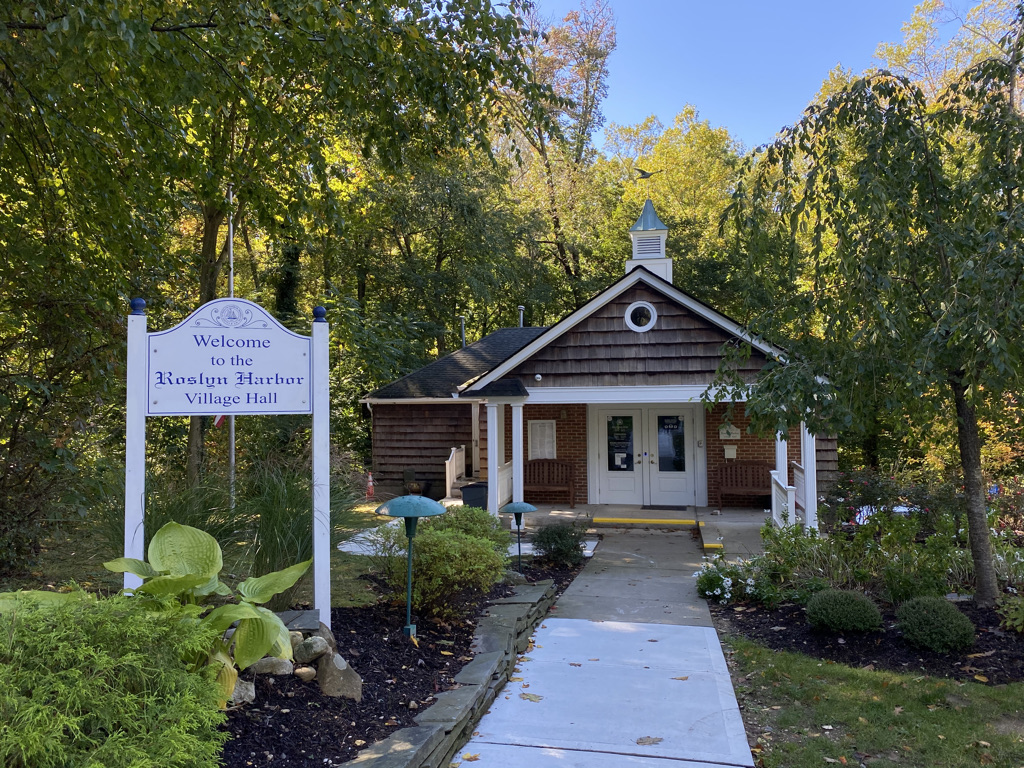
- Roslyn Harbor Village Hall in 2020

- Official emblem of Roslyn Harbor
- Nickname(s): "Millionaire's Village" "Switzerland of Long Island"
- Location in Nassau County and the state of New York

- Location on Long Island Location within the state of New York
- Coordinates: 40°49′5″N 73°38′2″W
- Country: United States
- State: New York
- County: Nassau
- Town: North Hempstead; Oyster Bay
- Incorporated: October 17, 1931
- Named for: Its proximity to Roslyn and Hempstead Harbor

Government
  - Mayor: Sandy K. Quentzel
  - Deputy Mayor: Joshua Kopelowitz

Area
  - Total: 1.19 sq mi (3.09 km^{2})
  - Land: 1.19 sq mi (3.08 km^{2})
  - Water: 0 sq mi (0.00 km^{2})
- Elevation: 108 ft (33 m)

Population (2020)
  - Total: 1,067
  - Density: 896.1/sq mi (345.97/km^{2})
- Demonym(s): Roslynian; Roslynite
- Time zone: UTC−5 (Eastern (EST))
  - Summer (DST): UTC−4 (EDT)
- ZIP Codes: 11576 (Roslyn); 11545 (Glen Head); 11548 (Greenvale)
- Area codes: 516, 363
- FIPS code: 36-63803
- GNIS feature ID: 0962933
- Website: www.roslynharbor.org

Roslyn Harbor is a village in Nassau County, on the North Shore of Long Island, in New York, United States. It is considered part of the Greater Roslyn area, which is anchored by the Incorporated Village of Roslyn. The population was 1,067 at the time of the 2020 census.

The Incorporated Village of Roslyn Harbor is located mostly in the Town of North Hempstead with small sections in the Town of Oyster Bay.

== History ==
Prior to the European powers colonizing Long Island, the area was inhabited by the Matinecock Native Americans. The European powers began to settle in and colonize the area during the 17th century; many of the area's first settlers from Europe were Dutch and English.

In the 19th century, many wealthy individuals from New York City began to erect large country estates on Long Island's Gold Coast – including many in what is now the Village of Roslyn Harbor.

Roslyn Harbor incorporated as a village on October 17, 1931, as a result of the residents wishing to make their own zoning codes and other laws under the Municipal Home Rule Law. At the time, the majority of Roslyn Harbor consisted of a few large estates, in turn giving it the nickname of "Millionaire's Village."

=== Etymology ===
The "Roslyn" part of Roslyn Harbor's name is shared with Roslyn, Roslyn Estates, and Roslyn Heights, and ultimately can be traced back to when the name "Roslyn" was chosen for that village, as the geography in Roslyn reminded officials of the geography of Roslin, Scotland. The "Harbor" part of the name reflects its proximity to Hempstead Harbor. The name was chosen during the incorporation movement.

An earlier proposed name was Roslyn Hills, due to its hilly location, proximity to Roslyn, and because the Long Island Rail Road advertised the area as the "Switzerland of Long Island." The "Hills" was substituted with "Harbor" after concerns were expressed that it could be mixed up with the nearby hamlet of Roslyn Heights.

Prior to incorporating, the area was generally considered part of Roslyn (which would not incorporate until January 1932) – and, before that name was chosen for the area in 1844, it was known as Hempstead Harbor.

== Geography ==
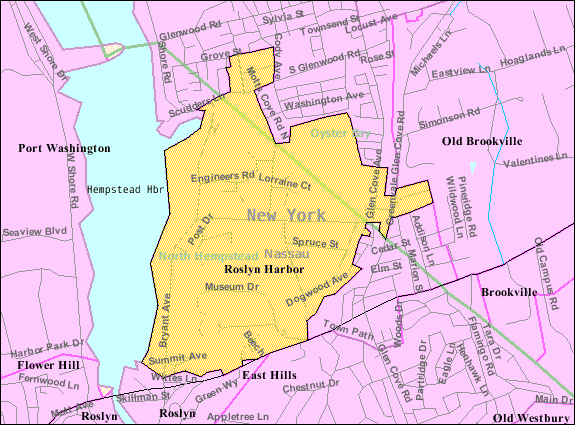
U.S. Census map of Roslyn Harbor

According to the United States Census Bureau, the village has a total area of 1.2 square miles (3.1 km^{2}), all land.

=== Topography ===
Like the rest of Long Island's North Shore, Roslyn Harbor is situated on a terminal moraine, known as the Harbor Hill Moraine. This terminal moraine was formed by glaciers during the Wisconsin Glacial Episode, and is named for Harbor Hill in Roslyn and East Hills; Harbor Hill is the highest geographic point in Nassau County.

According to the United States Environmental Protection Agency and the United States Geological Survey, the highest point in Roslyn Harbor is located just southwest of the intersection of Dogwood Avenue and Spruce Street, at 234 feet (71 m), and the lowest point in the village is Hempstead Harbor, which is at sea level.

=== Drainage ===
Roslyn Harbor is located within the Hempstead Harbor watershed, and is also located within the larger Long Island Sound/Atlantic Ocean Watershed.

=== Climate ===
According to the Köppen climate classification, Roslyn Harbor has a Humid subtropical climate (type Cfa) with cool, wet winters and hot, humid summers. Precipitation is uniform throughout the year, with slight spring and fall peaks.

Climate data for Roslyn Harbor, New York
Month	Jan	Feb	Mar	Apr	May	Jun	Jul	Aug	Sep	Oct	Nov	Dec	Year
Record high °F (°C)	71 (22)	73 (23)	87 (31)	94 (34)	97 (36)	101 (38)	108 (42)	105 (41)	97 (36)	89 (32)	83 (28)	76 (24)	108 (42)
Mean daily maximum °F (°C)	40.4 (4.7)	42.9 (6.1)	51.1 (10.6)	61.2 (16.2)	70.6 (21.4)	79.6 (26.4)	84.5 (29.2)	83.3 (28.5)	76.0 (24.4)	65.4 (18.6)	55.7 (13.2)	45.1 (7.3)	63.0 (17.2)
Daily mean °F (°C)	33.4 (0.8)	35.0 (1.7)	42.0 (5.6)	51.8 (11.0)	60.8 (16.0)	70.1 (21.2)	75.2 (24.0)	74.1 (23.4)	67.2 (19.6)	56.5 (13.6)	47.8 (8.8)	38.2 (3.4)	54.3 (12.4)
Mean daily minimum °F (°C)	26.4 (−3.1)	27.1 (−2.7)	33.5 (0.8)	42.4 (5.8)	51.0 (10.6)	60.6 (15.9)	65.8 (18.8)	65.0 (18.3)	58.3 (14.6)	47.6 (8.7)	39.9 (4.4)	31.2 (−0.4)	45.7 (7.6)
Record low °F (°C)	−4 (−20)	−5 (−21)	5 (−15)	13 (−11)	34 (1)	43 (6)	50 (10)	46 (8)	36 (2)	27 (−3)	17 (−8)	−2 (−19)	−5 (−21)
Average precipitation inches (mm)	3.56 (90)	2.87 (73)	4.47 (114)	3.85 (98)	3.23 (82)	3.54 (90)	3.97 (101)	4.26 (108)	4.31 (109)	4.08 (104)	3.18 (81)	3.99 (101)	45.31 (1,151)
Average snowfall inches (cm)	5.5 (14)	7.8 (20)	3.7 (9.4)	0.3 (0.76)	0 (0)	0 (0)	0 (0)	0 (0)	0 (0)	0 (0)	0.2 (0.51)	5.7 (14)	23.2 (58.67)
Average relative humidity (%)	73	75	72	72	75	74	73	71	73	73	71	75	73
Mean monthly sunshine hours	177	153	172	167	202	213	237	241	215	190	210	171	2,348
Average ultraviolet index	2	2	2	3	5	6	6	6	5	3	2	2	4
Source: NOAA; Weather Atlas

== Demographics ==
Historical population
Census	Pop.	Note	%±
1940	303		—
1950	402		32.7%
1960	925		130.1%
1970	1,125		21.6%
1980	1,129		0.4%
1990	1,114		−1.3%
2000	1,023		−8.2%
2010	1,051		2.7%
2020	1,067		1.5%
U.S. Decennial Census

=== 2010 census ===
As of the 2010 United States census, there were 1,051 people residing in the village. The racial makeup of the village was 83.63% White, 1.43% African American, 11.80% Asian, 1.14% from other races, and 1.90% from two or more races. Hispanic or Latino of any race were 5.33% of the population.

=== Census 2000 ===
As of the 2000 United States census, there were 1,023 people, 356 households, and 301 families residing in the village. The population density was 858.9 inhabitants per square mile (331.6/km^{2}). There were 367 housing units at an average density of 308.1 per square mile (119.0/km^{2}). The racial makeup of the village was 91.59% White, 1.27% African American, 4.99% Asian, 1.08% from other races, and 1.08% from two or more races. Hispanic or Latino of any race were 3.32% of the population.

There were 356 households, out of which 34.6% had children under the age of 18 living with them, 77.2% were married couples living together, 5.3% had a female householder with no husband present, and 15.4% were non-families. 12.6% of all households were made up of individuals, and 6.2% had someone living alone who was 65 years of age or older. The average household size was 2.87 and the average family size was 3.12.

In the village, the population was spread out, with 23.5% under the age of 18, 4.3% from 18 to 24, 21.3% from 25 to 44, 31.5% from 45 to 64, and 19.5% who were 65 years of age or older. The median age was 46 years. For every 100 females, there were 95.6 males. For every 100 females age 18 and over, there were 90.0 males.

The median income for a household in the village was $128,295, and the median income for a family was $150,000. Males had a median income of $100,000 versus $41,071 for females. The per capita income for the village was $69,778. About 1.3% of families and 2.5% of the population were below the poverty line, including 3.3% of those under age 18 and 2.3% of those age 65 or over.

== Parks and recreation ==
- Cedarmere – Former estate of William Cullen Bryant; now a park and preserve.
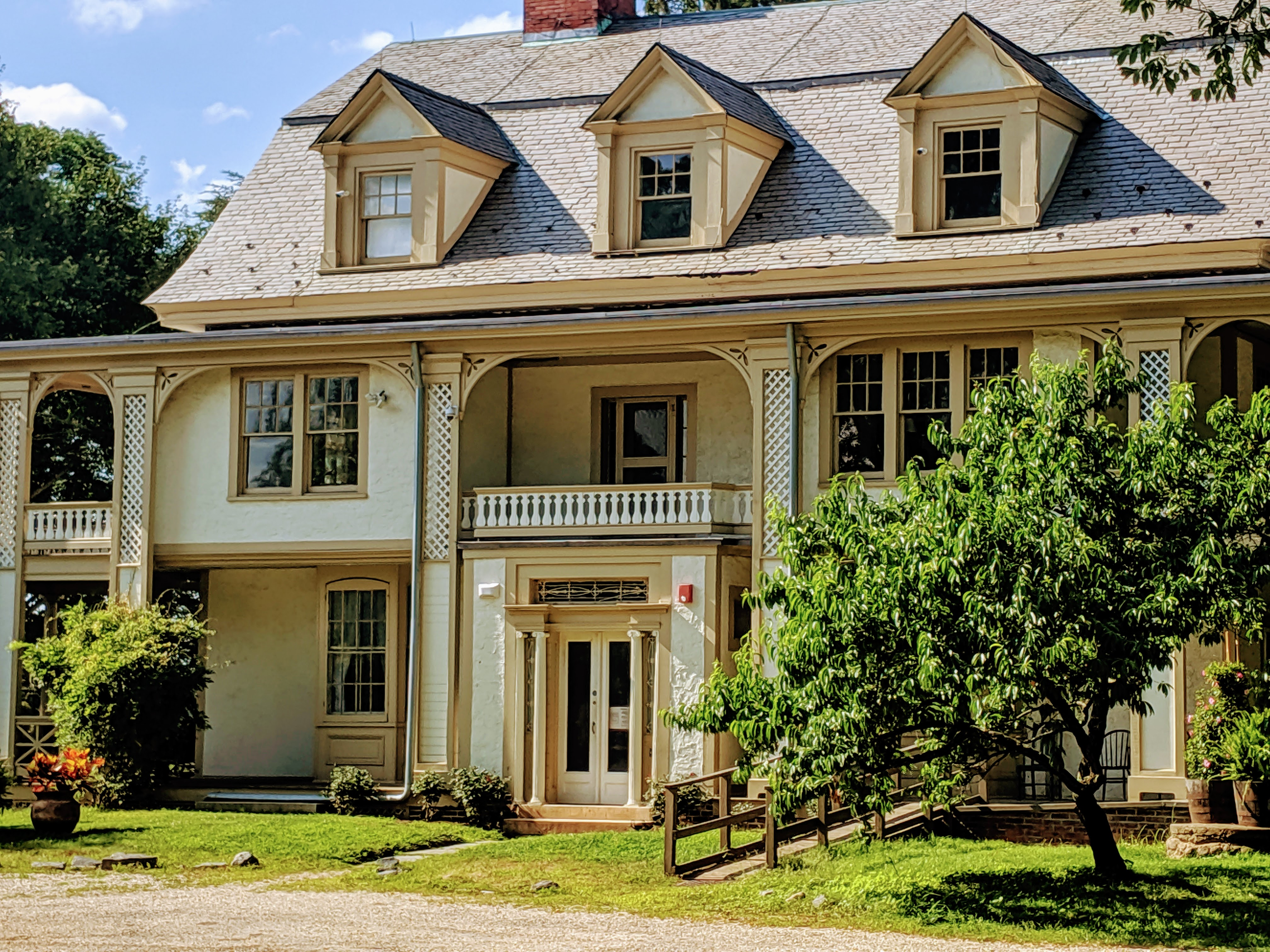
  Cedarmere in 2020
- Engineers Country Club – A private country club in Roslyn Harbor.
- Nassau County Museum of Art – A major art museum in Roslyn Harbor.
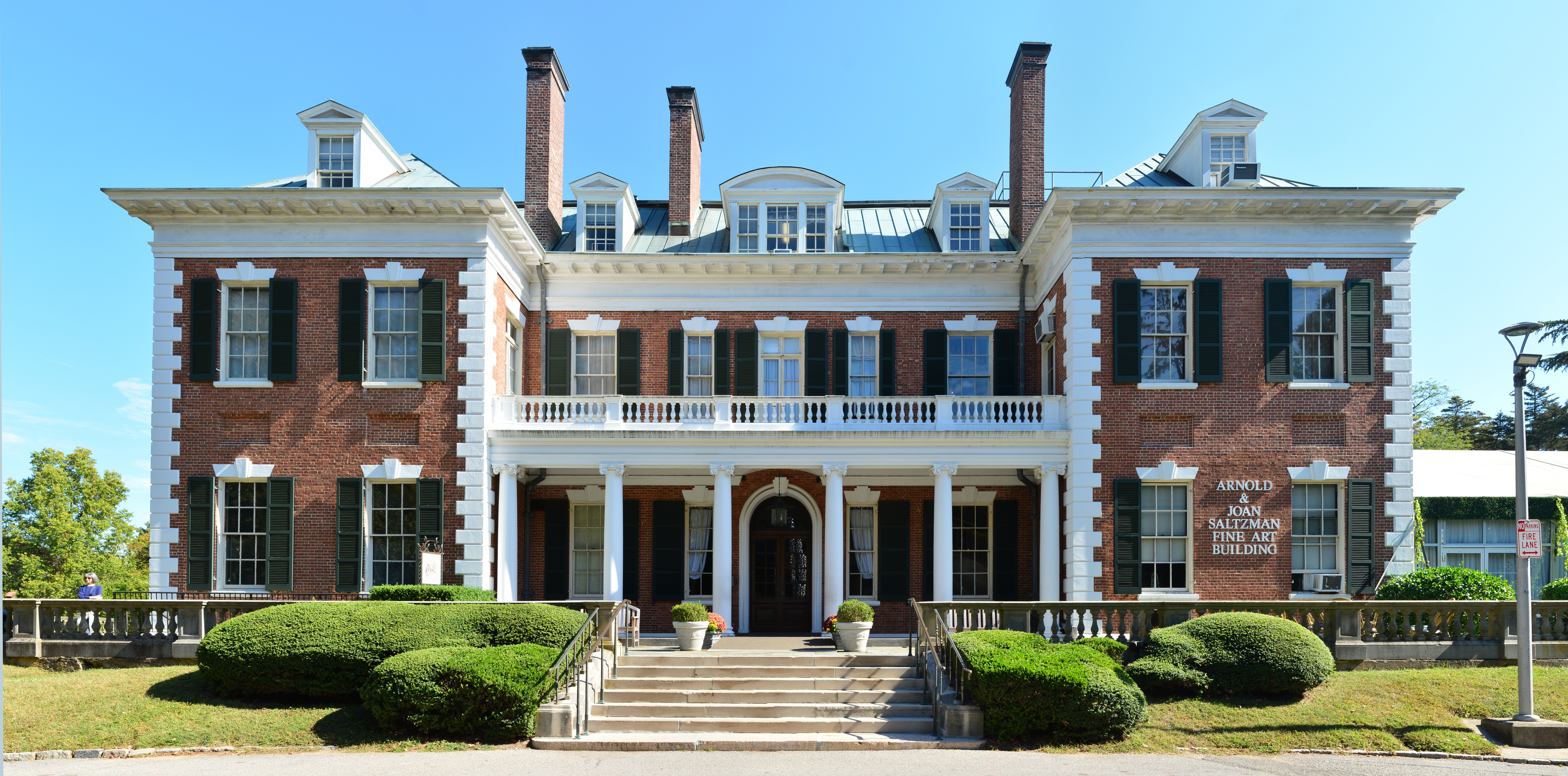
  The Nassau County Museum of Art in 2025

== Government ==
=== Village government ===
As of July 2026, the Mayor of Roslyn Harbor is Sandy K. Quentzel, the Deputy Mayor is Joshua Kopelowitz, and the Trustees are Lauren Archer, Jasun Fiorentino, James Friscia, and Joshua Kopelowitz.

=== Representation in higher government ===
On the town level, the portions of Roslyn Harbor in the Town of North Hempstead are located within that town's 2nd council district, which as of July 2026 is represented on the North Hempstead Town Council by Edward W. Scott III (R–Albertson). The portions in the Town of Oyster Bay are represented at-large on the Oyster Bay Town Council, which lacks legislative districts.

On the county level, Roslyn Harbor is located in Nassau County's 11th Legislative district, which as of July 2026 is represented in the Nassau County Legislature by Delia DiRiggi-Whitton (D–Glen Cove).

On the state level, Roslyn Harbor is split between the New York State Assembly's 13th and 15th State Assembly districts, which as of July 2026 are represented by Charles D. Lavine (D–Glen Cove) and Jacob Ryan Blumencranz (R–Oyster Bay), respectively. It is additionally located entirely within the New York State Senate's 7th State Senate district, which as of July 2026 is represented by Jack M. Martins (R–Old Westbury).

On the federal level, Roslyn Harbor is located entirely within New York's 3rd congressional district, which as of July 2026 is represented in the United States Congress by Thomas R. Suozzi (D–Glen Cove). Like the rest of New York, it is represented in the United States Senate by Charles E. Schumer (D) and Kirsten E. Gillibrand (D).

=== Politics ===
In the 2024 U.S. presidential election, the majority of Roslyn Harbor voters voted for Donald J. Trump (R).

== Education ==
=== School districts ===
Roslyn Harbor is served by both the Roslyn Union Free School District and the North Shore Central School District.

=== Library districts ===
Roslyn Harbor is served by Roslyn's library district (served by the Bryant Library in Roslyn) and by the Gold Coast Library District (served by the Gold Coast Public Library in Glen Head). The boundaries of these two districts correspond with those of the school districts; Roslyn's library district serves the portions of Roslyn Harbor in the Roslyn School District, while the Gold Coast Library District serves those portions within the North Shore School District.

== Infrastructure ==
=== Transportation ===
==== Road ====
Northern Boulevard (NY 25A) passes through the village and forms much of its southern border.

Other major roads within Roslyn Harbor include Back Road, Bryant Avenue (CR C26), Glen Cove Avenue (CR C91), Glen Cove Road (CR 1), and Glenwood Road (CR E25).

Additionally, the Village of Roslyn Harbor owns and maintains approximately 4.75 miles (7.64 km) of roads.

==== Rail ====
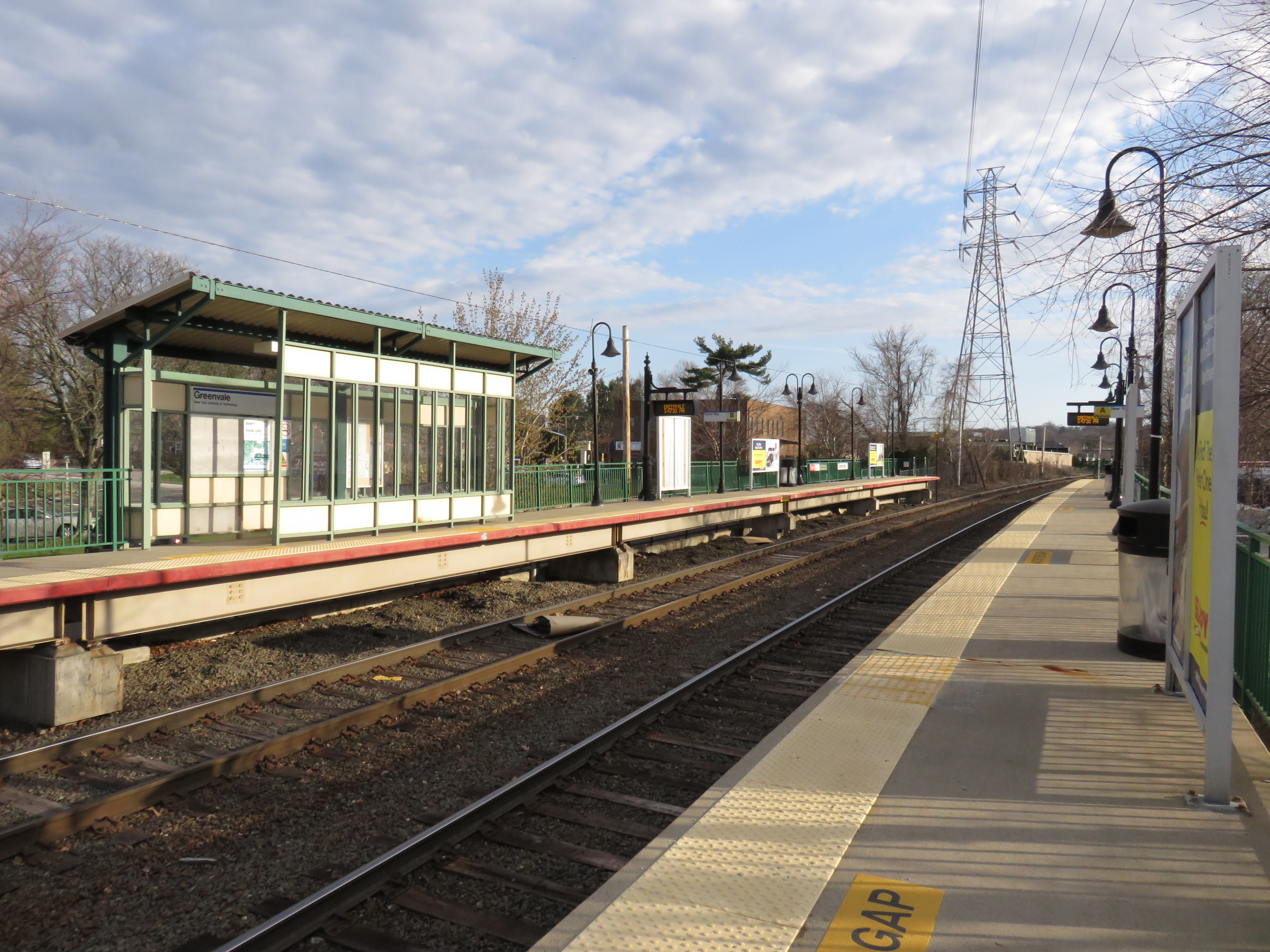
The Greenvale Long Island Rail Road station in 2016

The Greenvale station on the Long Island Rail Road's Oyster Bay Branch is located primarily within the Village of Roslyn Harbor, adjacent to the Roslyn Harbor–Greenvale border.

The short-lived North Roslyn station was also formerly located within present-day Roslyn Harbor, along the Oyster Bay Branch.

==== Bus ====
Roslyn Harbor is served by the n20H, n21, and n27 bus routes – all of which are operated by Nassau Inter-County Express (NICE).

=== Utilities ===
==== Natural gas ====
National Grid USA provides natural gas to homes and businesses within Roslyn Harbor that are hooked up to natural gas lines.

==== Power ====
PSEG Long Island provides power to all properties within Roslyn Harbor, on behalf of the Long Island Power Authority.

==== Sewage ====
Roslyn Harbor is not connected to any sanitary sewers, and accordingly, the entire village relies on cesspools and septic systems.

==== Water ====
Roslyn Harbor is primarily located within the boundaries of (and is thus served by) the Roslyn Water District. Smaller areas of the village are located within the boundaries of (and are thus served by) the Glenwood Water District and the Jericho Water District.

== Landmarks ==
Notable landmarks within Roslyn Harbor include:

- Cedarmere
- Clapham-Stern House
- Clayton
- Clifton
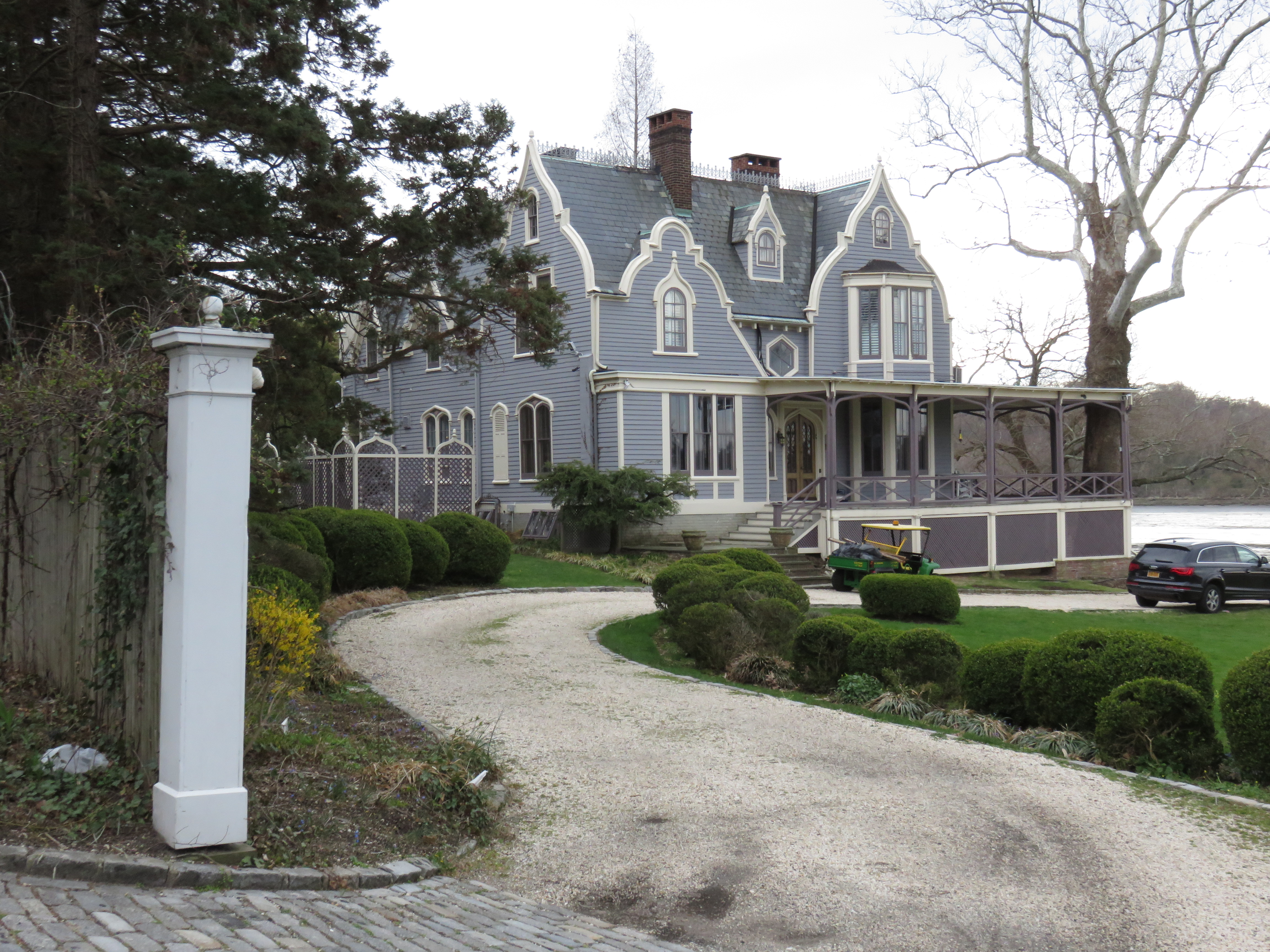
  Clifton in 2016
- Greenridge-Arthur Williams House
- Mudge Farmhouse
- Springbank
- Stephen and Charles Smith House
- Willowmere
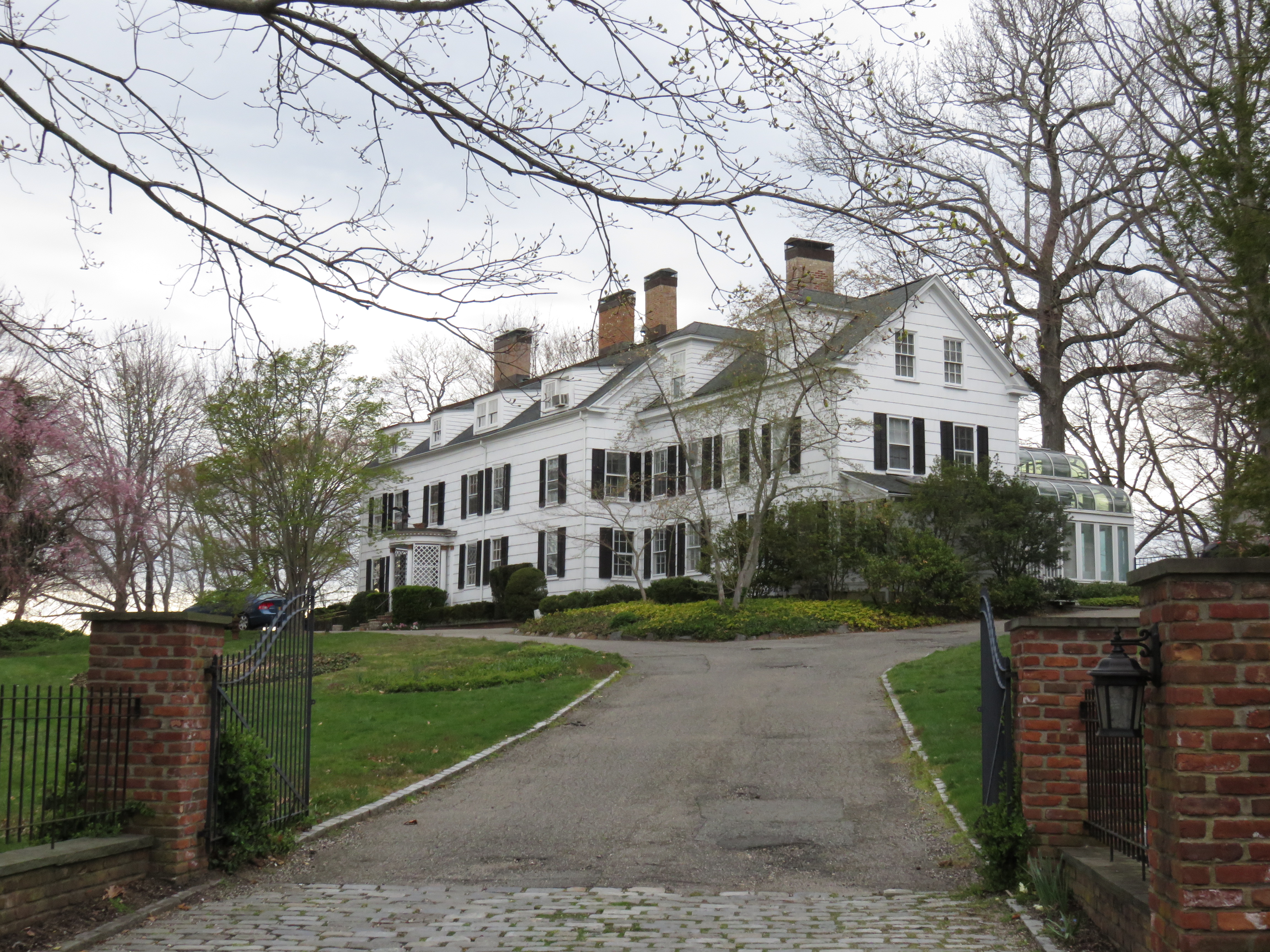
  Willowmere in 2016

Additionally, the Cedarmere-Clayton Estates Historic District is located within Roslyn Harbor, and consists of the Cedarmere and Clayton properties.

== Notable people ==
- William Cullen Bryant – Poet and journalist. Bryant lived at Cedarmere.
- William J. Casey – Former director of the Central Intelligence Agency; his Roslyn Harbor estate, Mayknoll, was his principal place of residence from 1948 until his death in 1987.
- James F. Curtis – Lawyer and former Assistant Secretary of the Treasury; lived at Willowmere.
- Childs Frick – Paleontologist.
- Brian Koppelman – Filmmaker, essayist, podcaster, TV series creator, former music business executive, and record producer.
- Gabriela Mistral – Chilean poet and Nobel laureate.
- Eugene H. Nickerson – Former democratic Nassau County Executive (1962–1970) and federal district court judge.
- William S. Silkworth – Sport shooter.
- Aaron Ward – Sailor and United States Navy officer who served in the Spanish–American War; lived at Willowmere.
- Arthur Williams – Electrical engineer who served as a Village trustee until his death in 1937.

== See also ==
- List of municipalities in New York
- Roslyn, New York
- Roslyn Estates, New York
- Roslyn Heights, New York
