= Mudge Farmhouse =

Historic house in New York, United States

- U.S. National Register of Historic Places
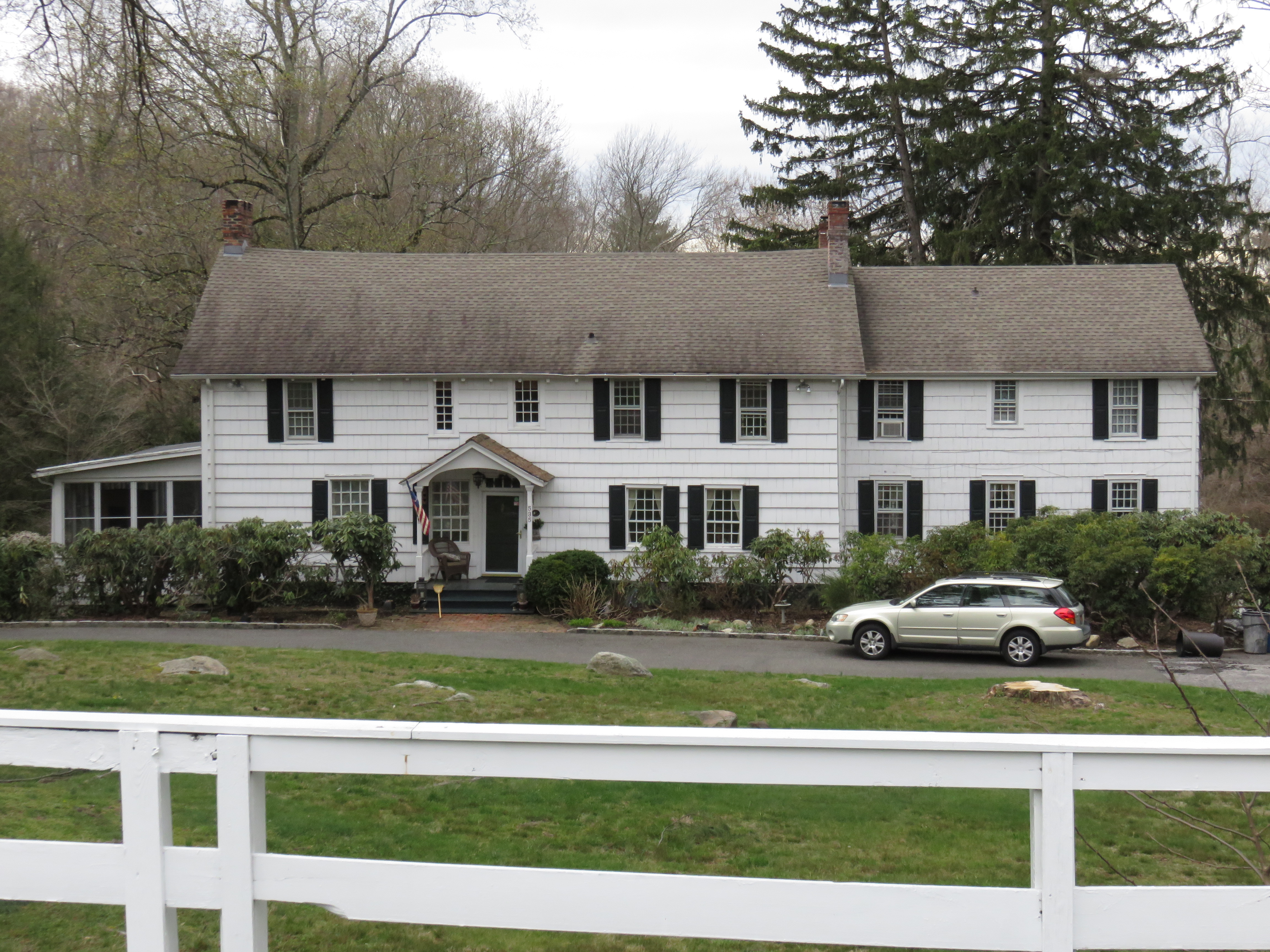

- Location within New York Location within the United States
- Location: 535 Motts Cove Rd. S, Roslyn Harbor, New York
- Coordinates: 40°48′55″N 73°38′13″W
- Area: 1.5 acres (0.61 ha)
- Built: 1720
- Architectural style: Colonial
- MPS: Roslyn Harbor, New York MPS
- NRHP reference No.: 99000876
- Added to NRHP: July 22, 1999

Mudge Farmhouse is a historic home located at Roslyn Harbor in Nassau County, New York. It was moved to its present location about 1920. It dates to the 18th century and is built of oak timbers. It features the original front Dutch door entry. Alterations and additions occurred when the house was moved. They are believed to have been designed by John Russell Pope, brother-in-law of the owner at the time, Robert Patchin.

It was added to the National Register of Historic Places in 1999.
