= Grace and Thomaston Buildings =

Historic commercial buildings in New York, United States

- U.S. National Register of Historic Places
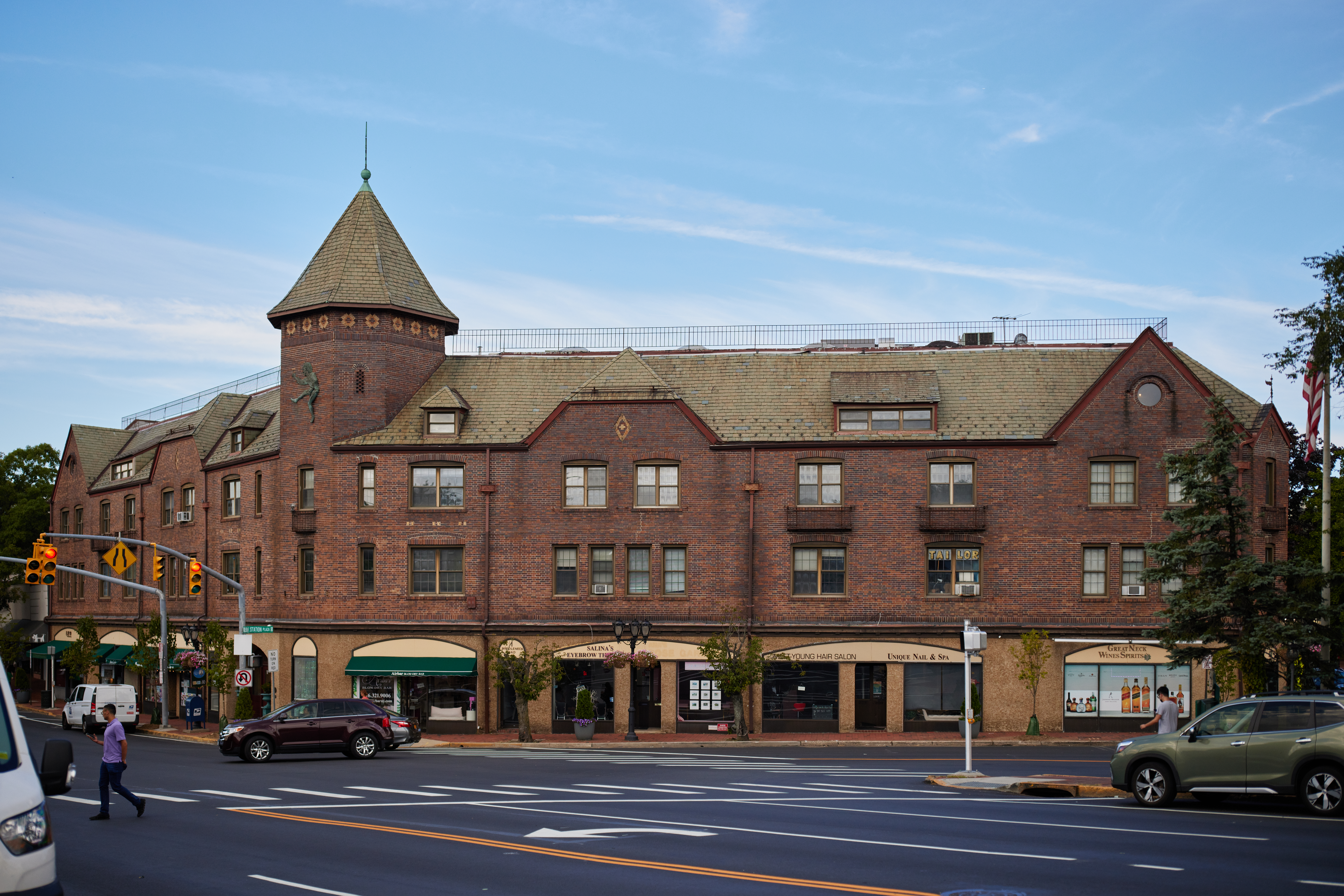
- The Grace and Thomaston Buildings as seen from near the corner of Middle Neck Road and Cutter Mill Road.

- Location within New York Location within the United States
- Location: 11 Middle Neck Rd., 8 Bond St., Great Neck Plaza, New York
- Coordinates: 40°47′15″N 73°43′40″W
- Area: less than one acre
- Built: 1914
- Architect: O'Connor, James W.
- NRHP reference No.: 78001865
- Added to NRHP: December 14, 1978

Grace and Thomaston Buildings are two historic commercial buildings located at Great Neck Plaza in Nassau County, New York. The Grace Building was built in 1914 and the Thomaston Building in 1926. They were both built by the W. R. Grace and Company.

== Grace Building ==
The Grace Building, located at 11 Middle Neck Road, is a massive 3 1/2-story brick building shaped like a chevron. It originally housed stores, offices, and apartments. It features a large octagonal tower at its central point and decorative wrought iron balconies adorn several windows.

== Thomaston Building ==
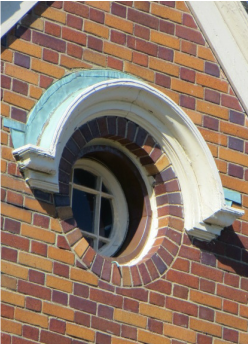
Oculus windows at the Thomaston Building - 8 Bond Street

The Thomaston Building, located at 8 Bond Street, is a 3 1/2-story brick building that originally served as headquarters for W. R. Grace Company's real estate operations. It features a slate covered gable roof.

It was added to the National Register of Historic Places on December 14, 1978.

The Thomaston Building currently contains 25,000 square feet of space, with 15 office spaces and 2 sidewalk-level restaurants. A 1981 basement-to-rooftop restoration effort fully modernized the building with contemporary amenities, energy efficiencies and private marble bathrooms. Management-sponsored programs such as 8at8, a tenant business networking and education group, help build community and offer business development skills. Unusually, some of the offices feature residential accommodation.

The name of the building is attributed to Thomaston, Maine, the hometown of Lillius Gilchrist, wife of William Russell Grace, future mayor of New York and founder of W. R. Grace and Company.

=== Architecture and design ===
The Thomaston Building was designed by James O’Connor and constructed in the Station Plaza neighborhood of Great Neck, near the company's global headquarters at 11 Middle Neck Road, also an O’Connor project. A four-story brick mews in Georgian Revival style, the structure's distinguishing characteristics include a cross-gabled roof, period showroom windows, round oculus windows and iron-tinted brickwork. Above the first story, a wood belt course with dentil molding separates the floors. On permanent display is a private collection of historic American flags and replicas. In 1978 it was placed on the National Register of Historic Places and designated a local historic landmark by the Village of Great Neck Plaza.

=== History ===
The building was commissioned by the W. R. Grace Company and built in 1926 to house its international real estate operations. W. R. Grace occupied both buildings until 1971, when it moved to Manhattan. For much of that decade the Thomaston Building housed a multi-vendor ground floor mall, while leasing the space above to private tenants and the Village of Great Neck Plaza, which used the building as its city hall. In 1976 the building was bought by Great Neck realtor Sidney Berg, who preserved the building's facade as part of a downtown beautification campaign. In 1981 the building was bought by an ownership group headed by Patrick Silberstein. Silberstein oversaw a complete restoration, with particular focus on historic preservation and use of authentic building materials. During this restoration the building was fitted with a greener energy system.
