= Nassau County Museum of Art =

Museum in Nassau County, New York

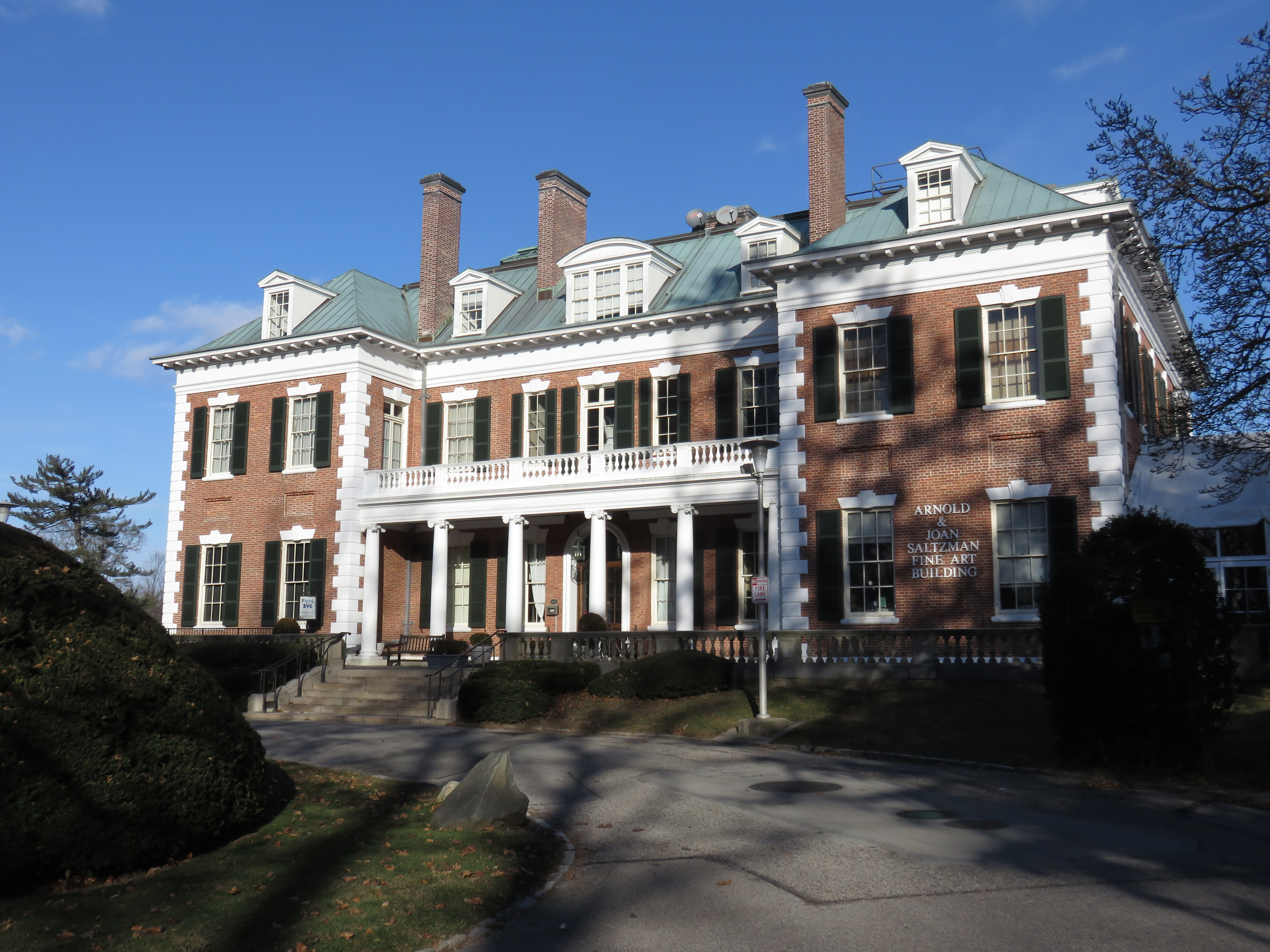
- Established: 1969
- Location: Roslyn Harbor, NY, United States
- Coordinates: 40.80965°N 73.64286°W
- Type: Art
- Visitors: 200,000
- Director: Beth Horn
- Website: www.nassaumuseum.com

The Nassau County Museum of Art (NCMA) is located on the former Frick "Clayton" Estate, a 145-acre (59 ha) property in Roslyn Harbor on the Gold Coast of Long Island, New York. The main museum building, the Arnold and Joan Saltzman Fine Arts Building, is a three-story neo-Georgian mansion designed by Ogden Codman Jr. around 1900 and later remodeled by Sir Charles Carrick Allom. In addition to the mansion, NCMA, which receives nearly 200,000 visitors each year, includes The Manes Family Art & Education Center, opened in 2017, as well as a Sculpture Park, a Formal Garden, rare specimen trees and marked walking trails.

== Overview ==
NCMA presents major rotating exhibitions, many of which are original to the museum and organized by its curatorial staff. The museum's exhibitions have reached across a broad spectrum of artistic concerns—from European and American art movements, (Note: Surrealism, September 2000 & May 2007) (Note: Reflections of Opulence, May 2001) (Note: A Century of Prints, March 2003) (Note: La Belle Epoque, June 2003) (Note: European Art Between the Wars, May 2004) (Note: Picasso, February 2005) (Note: Picasso and the School of Paris, November 2006) (Note: Pop and Op, February 2008) (Note: The Subject is Women: Impressionism and Post-Impressionism, January 2010) to epochs of American and European history, (Note: The Revolutionary War, January 2000) (Note: Napoleon And His Age, January 2001) (Note: Window on the West, February 2002) (Note: The World of Theodore Roosevelt, November 2002) (Note: The WPA Era, August 2004) (Note: The American Spirit: Paintings by Mort Künstler, August 2006) (Note: Napoleon and Eugenie, June 2009) to the influences of one art form or another (Note: Dance, Dance, Dance, June 2000) (Note: Explosive Photography/Photorealism, January 2004) (Note: Geoffrey Holder: A Life in Art, Theater and Dance, November 2007) and to the impact of Long Island artists on art and design. (Note: The Hamptons Since Pollock, April 2000) (Note: Tiffany and the Gilded Age, September 2008) In addition to these major exhibitions, NCMA mounts exhibitions of work by contemporary artists in the Manes Center gallery.

NCMA’s collection of more than 600 art objects spans American and European art of the 19th and 20th centuries. Encompassing all types of media, the collection includes works by Auguste Rodin, Édouard Vuillard, Pierre Bonnard, Roy Lichtenstein, Larry Rivers, Robert Rauschenberg, Chaim Gross, Moses Soyer, Audrey Flack, Frank Stella, Barbara Prey, George Segal, and Alex Katz among many others.

The museum's outdoor sculpture collection comprises more than 40 works by more than 30 sculptors installed throughout the 145-acre William Cullen Bryant Preserve. The works date from 1913 to 2018 and include sculptures by artists such as Mark di Suvero, Tom Otterness, Fernando Botero, Richard Serra and Masayuki Nagare.

The museum grounds include formal gardens and marked nature trails. Commissioned in 1925 by Frances Frick, an avid horticulturist and garden club member, the Frick Estate’s Formal Gardens have been restored to the original design of the famed landscape architect, Marian Cruger Coffin. Coffin considered these Formal Gardens to be among her finest creations. In recent years, the historic garden trellis and water tower have been restored to original condition. Additionally, many pathways through the 145-acre property are now marked as guided nature trails.

== History ==
Most of the property that became the museum grounds was formerly part of William Cullen Bryant's Upland Farm, adjacent to his home at Cedarmere. Around the turn of the 20th century, publisher Lloyd Stephens Bryce acquired the property and commissioned architect Ogden Codman Jr. to design a neo-Georgian mansion overlooking Hempstead Harbor.

In 1919, Henry Clay Frick acquired the Bryce estate for his son Childs Frick and daughter-in-law Frances Frick. The couple hired British architect Sir Charles Carrick Allom to remodel the house, which they named "Clayton".

Childs Frick and his family lived at Clayton until his death in 1965. Nassau County purchased the estate in 1969 and established a county art museum there. The museum became a private nonprofit institution in 1989. Following an exterior restoration, the mansion was renamed the Arnold and Joan Saltzman Fine Arts Building.

The Fine Arts Museum of Long Island, which had separated from the Nassau County Museum of Art, operated in Hempstead until its closure in 2003.

== Past exhibitions ==
- Surrealism, September 2000 and May 2007
- Reflections of Opulence, May 2001
- A Century of Prints, March 2003
- La Belle Epoque, June 2003
- European Art Between the Wars, May 2004
- Picasso, February 2005
- Picasso and the School of Paris, November 2006
- Pop and Op, February 2008
- The Subject is Women: Impressionism and Post-Impressionism, January 2010
- The Revolutionary War, January 2000
- Napoleon And His Age, January 2001
- Window on the West, February 2002
- The World of Theodore Roosevelt, November 2002
- The WPA Era, August 2004
- The American Spirit: Paintings by Mort Künstler, August 2006
- Napoleon and Eugenie, June 2009
- Dance, Dance, Dance, June 2000
- Explosive Photography/Photorealism, January 2004
- Geoffrey Holder: A Life in Art, Theater and Dance, November 2007
- The Hamptons Since Pollock, April 2000
- Tiffany and the Gilded Age, September 2008
- Jim Dine, March 2012
- Chagall, July 2012
- Alex Katz, June 2013
- Peter Max, October 2013
- Photorealism, July 2014
- China Then and Now, November 2014
- Out of the Vault, March 2015
