= Stephen and Charles Smith House =

Historic house in New York, United States

- U.S. National Register of Historic Places
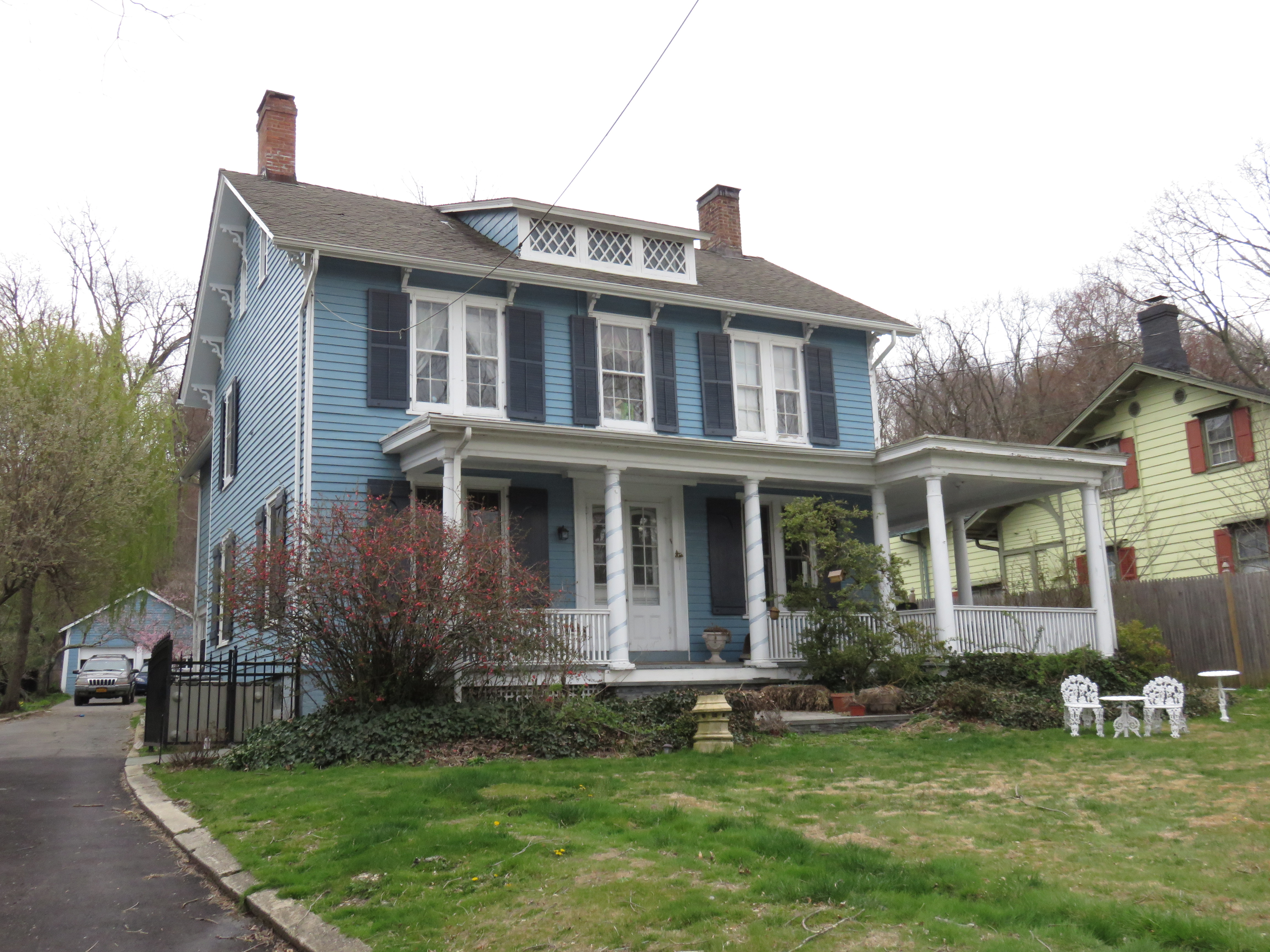

- Location within New York Location within the United States
- Location: 450 Bryant Ave., Roslyn Harbor, New York
- Coordinates: 40°48′47″N 73°38′45″W
- Area: less than one acre
- Built: 1860
- Architectural style: Italianate
- MPS: Roslyn Harbor, New York MPS
- NRHP reference No.: 99000873
- Added to NRHP: July 22, 1999

Stephen and Charles Smith House is a historic home located at Roslyn Harbor in Nassau County, New York. It was built about 1860 and is a 2 1/2-story timber frame dwelling with a 2 1/2-story ell in a vernacular Italianate style. It features a full-width porch on the front elevation. From 1892 to 1914, it was the property of Nora Godwin, granddaughter of William Cullen Bryant.

It was added to the National Register of Historic Places in 1999.
