= Springbank (Roslyn Harbor, New York) =

Historic house in New York, United States

- U.S. National Register of Historic Places
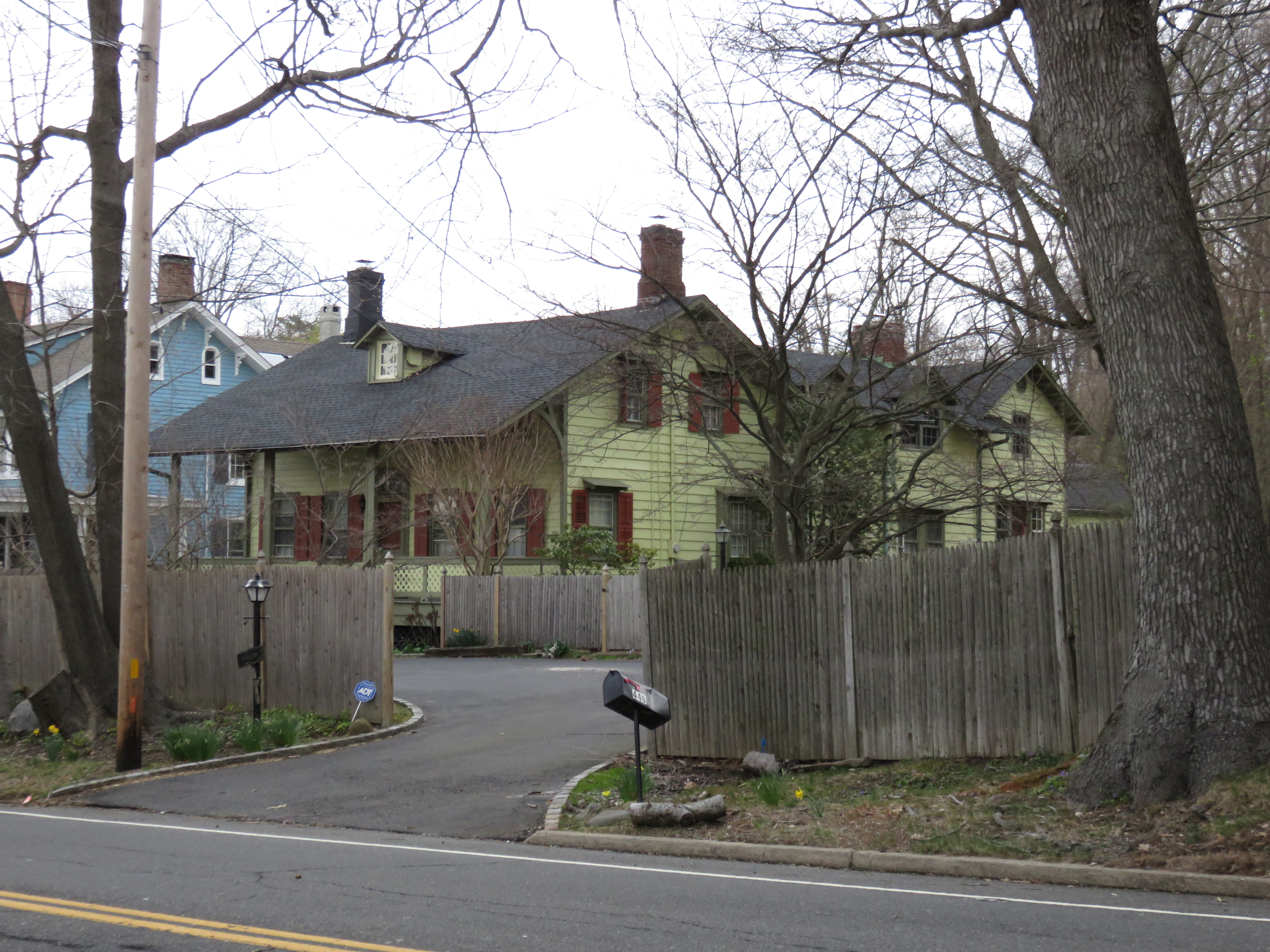
- South end of the driveway to Springbank on Bryant Avenue.

- Location within New York Location within the United States
- Location: 440 Bryant Avenue, Roslyn Harbor, New York
- Coordinates: 40°48′46″N 73°38′45″W
- Area: less than one acre
- Built: 1880
- Architectural style: Greek Revival
- MPS: Roslyn Harbor, New York MPS
- NRHP reference No.: 99001128
- Added to NRHP: September 9, 1999

Springbank is a historic home located at Roslyn Harbor in Nassau County, New York. It was built about 1835 and expanded and modified in 1880. A two-story rear addition was completed in 1959. It exhibits building construction and stylistic details from a number of periods. The first renovation was a conversion of the original simple dwelling to a Swiss cottage style building. Details added include the Dutch door main entry, full front porch, overhanging roof, front dormer, and a seven-foot addition. It features a deep front porch on the front elevation with sawn brackets. The property was once owned by the family of William Cullen Bryant.

It was added to the National Register of Historic Places in 1999.
