= Cedarmere-Clayton Estates =

Historic houses in New York, United States

- Clayton-Cedarmere Estates
- U.S. National Register of Historic Places
- U.S. Historic district
- New York State Register of Historic Places
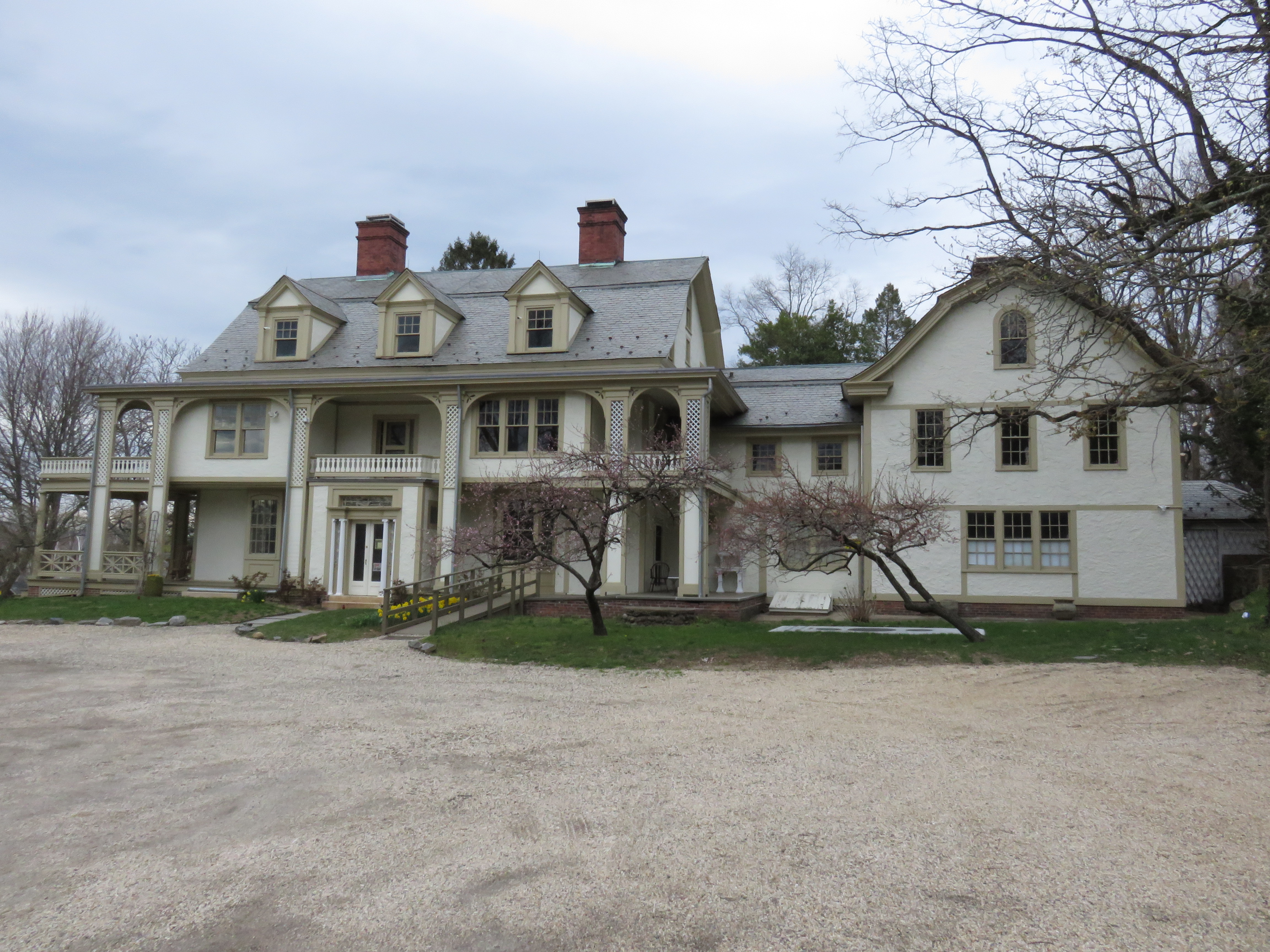
- Front elevation of Cedarmere, 2016

- Location within New York Location within the United States
- Location: Roslyn Harbor, NY
- Nearest city: Glen Cove
- Coordinates: 40°48′40″N 73°38′45″W
- Area: 172 acres (70 ha)
- Built: 1843, 1899
- Architect: Ogden Codman, Jr., others
- Architectural style: Colonial Revival, Classical Revival, Gothic Revival
- MPS: Historic and Architectural Resources of Roslyn Harbor
- NRHP reference No.: 86002634

Significant dates
- Added to NRHP: 1986
- Designated NYSRHP: August 4, 1986

The Clayton-Cedarmere Estates are located in Roslyn Harbor, New York, United States, listed jointly on the National Register of Historic Places & New York State Register of Historic Places in 1986.

Clayton – the bulk of the property – is the large landscaped Bryce/Frick estate, now home to the Nassau County Museum of Art. Cedarmere – the smaller of the two – is William Cullen Bryant's estate, currently undergoing interior renovation, is located on the west side of Bryant Avenue; overlooking Hempstead Harbor, now a historic house museum. The grounds are open to the public. The two combined properties, with input from several notable architects, illustrate the development of estates on the North Shore of Long Island over a period of nearly a century.

Bryant originally owned almost the entire property. Fifteen years after Bryant's death, in 1893, Lloyd Bryce bought the largely undeveloped inland portion of the estate and hired Ogden Codman, Jr. to design a mansion for it. In 1919, the dying Henry Clay Frick purchased the estate for his son Childs, who, after renovating it and expanding it, lived there with his family until his 1965 death. Four years later, it was turned over to the county for use as a museum.

== Estates ==
All of Cedarmere and most of Clayton were part of Bryant's original purchase. After his descendants sold all but the area around Cedarmere to the Bryces, they and the Fricks made some other additions as well.

=== Cedarmere ===
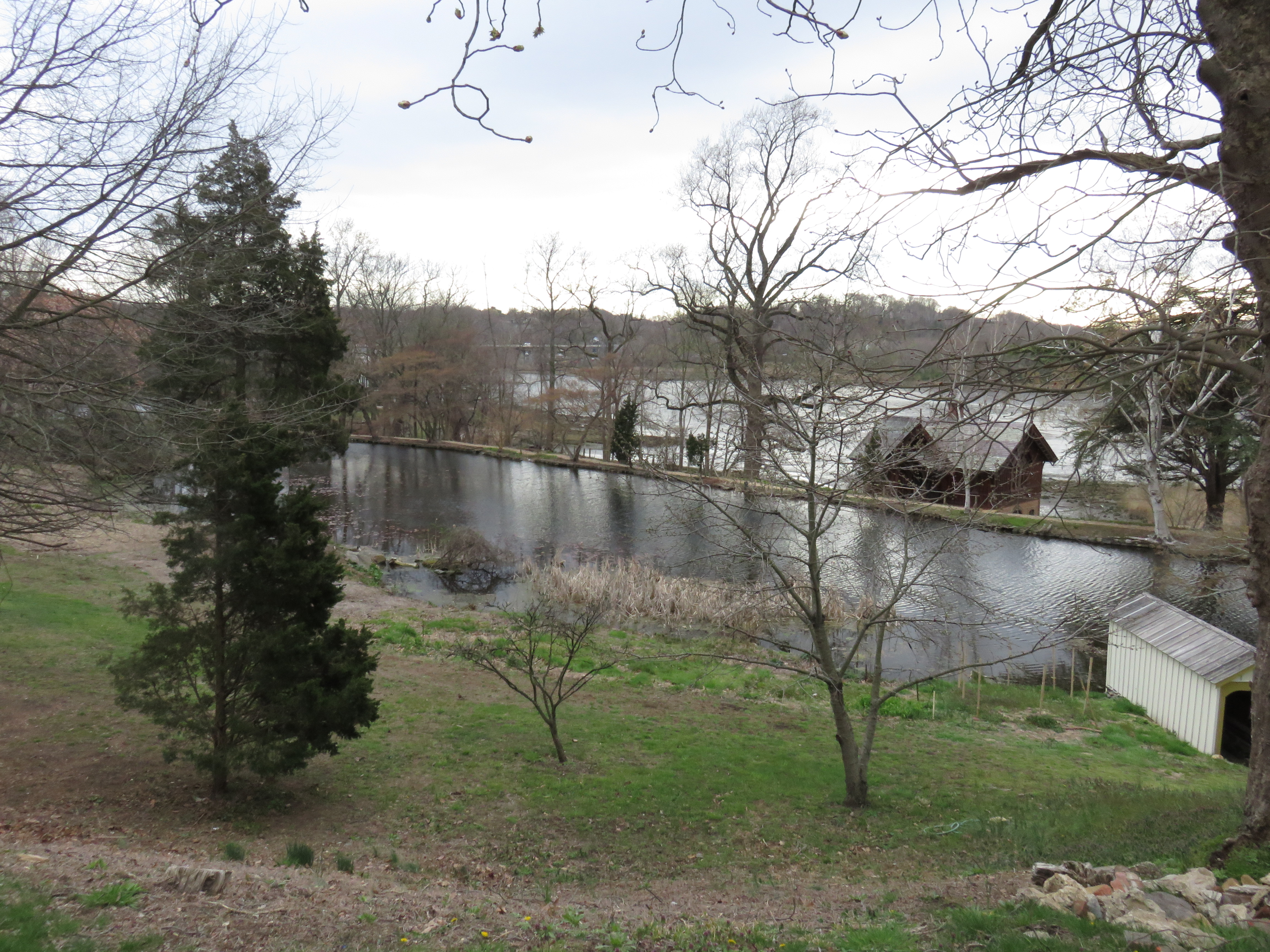
Cedarmere pond in 2016

Cedarmere is located behind a high stone wall on a 7-acre (2.8 ha) parcel along Bryant Ave., Roslyn Harbor, with two small ponds and a landscape designed by Frederick Law Olmsted. Its main house is a three-bay, 2 1/2-story main block with two wings: a two-story multi-bay structure to the east and a smaller, single-story section to the north. All are covered in slate gambrel roofs, fenestrated with trimmed gabled dormers. Window shapes vary throughout the facades. The house is faced with stucco, except for the visible stone foundation. A green glass-and-metal conservatory protrudes from the front, and a porch wraps around all but the north side.

A single-bay entrance pavilion projects onto the south porch, overlooking the larger pond and its stone bridge. It is topped with a railed balcony. The doorway is heavily ornamented with classical molded surround, pilasters, sidelights, entablature and leaded transom. The south elevation also has solid and latticework supports with decorated balusters and brackets.

At the other edge of the main house's pond is a small Gothic Revival building known as the Mill, although it was never used as such and remains purely decorative, used mainly for storage. Its brick basement gives way to a board-and-batten first floor, with heavy surface decoration, and then to a slate-covered cross-gabled roof with decorated bargeboards and filials, topped by a brick chimney. The windows have been trimmed with arches of various shapes and other decorative touches. The main side window has 'W' 'C' 'B' (William Cullen Bryant's initial) etched in the top panes.

Other outbuildings include a small greenhouse south of the garden and two more modern garages to the north, some distance from the house. The latter two are the only improvements to the property not considered contributing.

=== Clayton ===
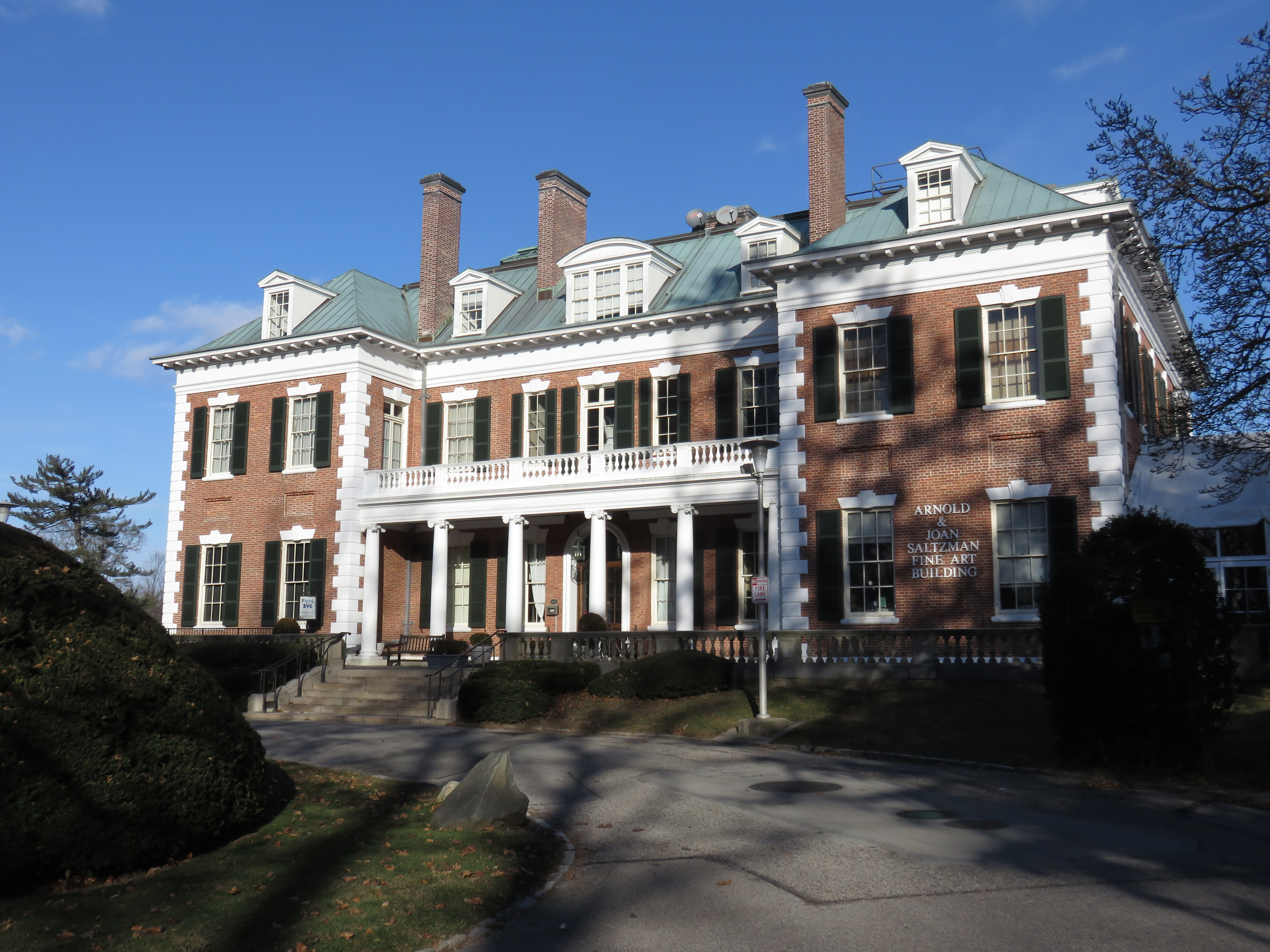
Clayton, currently housing the Nassau County Museum of Art

Clayton's property begins across Bryant from Cedarmere, but its main entrance is located on Northern Blvd. (NY 25A). The drive up, after passing a hipped-roofed brick Neoclassical gatehouse to what is now the museum takes visitors through some of the pastorally landscaped 165 acres (66 ha) that make up the center of Roslyn Harbor. The main house sits on a high plateau, surrounded by plantings and a modern parking lot. It is a Georgian Revival building, brick with stone trim and copper hipped roof, pierced by-gabled dormers, its eaves lined with modillions above a stone entablature.

The main block is two and a half stories high and nine bays wide. On both end there are symmetrical, two-bay pavilions outlined in quoins. The front facade has a five-bay open porch with Ionic columns and a flat roof, entablature and balustrade. The main entrance is a double door with semi-circular transom. On the east facade a series of round-arched French doors give access to the garden, topped by a balustraded balcony. Two one-story arcades wings project from it. The mansion's interior features much original woodwork and plaster.

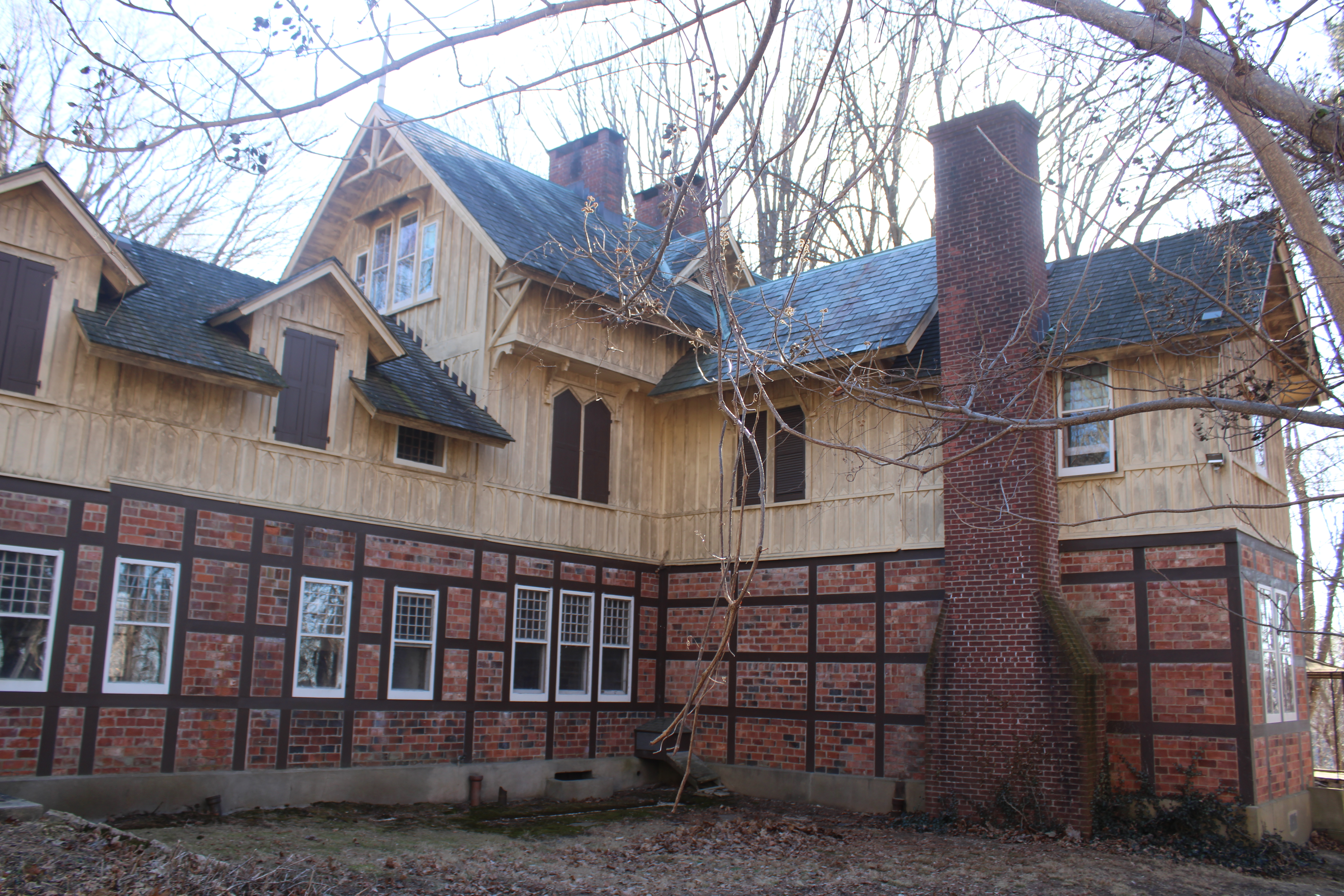
The Joshua Dewey Cottage, presently awaiting renovation, on the property of the Nassau County Museum of Art

Near the main house is a garden designed by Marian Coffin, with symmetrical plantings surrounding a central fountain. The remnants of a private zoo, primarily an old animal enclosure and tower. A narrow road leads to the Jerusha Dewey Cottage, originally built by Bryant for a friend of his and later used as a guest house, after extensive renovation by the Fricks. It is therefore a mixture of brick foundation, board-and-batten siding, slate roof and a mix of fenestration styles.

As at Cedarmere, two more modern buildings have been erected to support the property's current use as an art museum and sculpture garden. They are the only ones of the 11 buildings and structures at Clayton not considered contributing.

== History ==
The property that became Cedarmere had been in use since the early days of local settlement in the 17th century. The earliest known house on it was built in 1787 by Richard Kirk, a Quaker farmer. Bryant bought a small house first built by Joseph Moulton in 1843 with the intent of establishing a retreat for himself from his job in the city as editor of the New York Evening Post, where he could contemplate nature and write his poetry. He expanded both the land and the house through the 1850s and 1860s into the present structure, following the then-popular principles of Andrew Jackson Downing and disciples like Calvert Vaux, who supposedly designed the mill house, calling for small Gothic Revival cottages, sometimes in a Picturesque mode, that maintained harmony with their rural surroundings. At Cedarmere, as he later named the property, he received not only Vaux and his sometime collaborator Frederick Law Olmsted, but other cultural notables of the era such as painter Thomas Cole, James Fenimore Cooper and actor Edwin Booth.

He sold it to his daughter Julia in 1875, as long as he was allowed to live the remainder of his life there; and he did, dying three years later. She in turn sold it to her nephew, Harold Godwin, in 1891. Eight years later, he sold the undeveloped property that became Clayton to Lloyd Bryce, a former congressman and heir to industrial fortunes.

The upper stories of Cedarmere were damaged considerably by a 1903 fire. On the other property, Bryce hired Codman, a young architect responsible for many seaside homes in the Northeast, to design the main house, and began creating gardens in the property's northwest corner. The Fricks hired Charles Allom to modify the house for their use when they moved in 1919, renaming it Clayton, but Codman's design remains largely unchanged. Allom's main changes were the replacement of the original entrance loggia with the porch and, inside, creating a large entrance hall in keeping with the Fricks' intention to emulate an English country house, a popular aspiration of wealthy Americans during the 1920s. To that end, Guy Lowell designed the gatehouse, and Marian Cruger Coffin designed the main garden a decade later.

Four years after Frick's death, in 1969, the family sold the estate to Nassau County for use as an art museum. In 1989 the county transferred control to a private foundation. The Godwin family continued living in Cedarmere until they, too, donated it to the county for use as a museum in 1975.

== Cedarmere and Clayton today ==
Both estates are open to the public.
The grounds at Cedarmere are free and open year-round. The house is currently closed for interior restoration.
The Mill underwent major restoration in 2013, under the supervision of the Roslyn Landmark Society, with funding from the Gerry Charitable Trust. A grant from the New York State Environmental Protection Fund was used by Nassau County for major renovations and painting of the exterior of the House in Fall, 2013. The Friends and the Roslyn Landmark Society have contributed funds for additional interior and exterior renovations.

Visitors to Clayton must pay an entrance fee as well as parking; the museum is open every day except Mondays and holidays year-round.
