= Clifton (Roslyn Harbor, New York) =

Historic house in New York, United States

- U.S. National Register of Historic Places
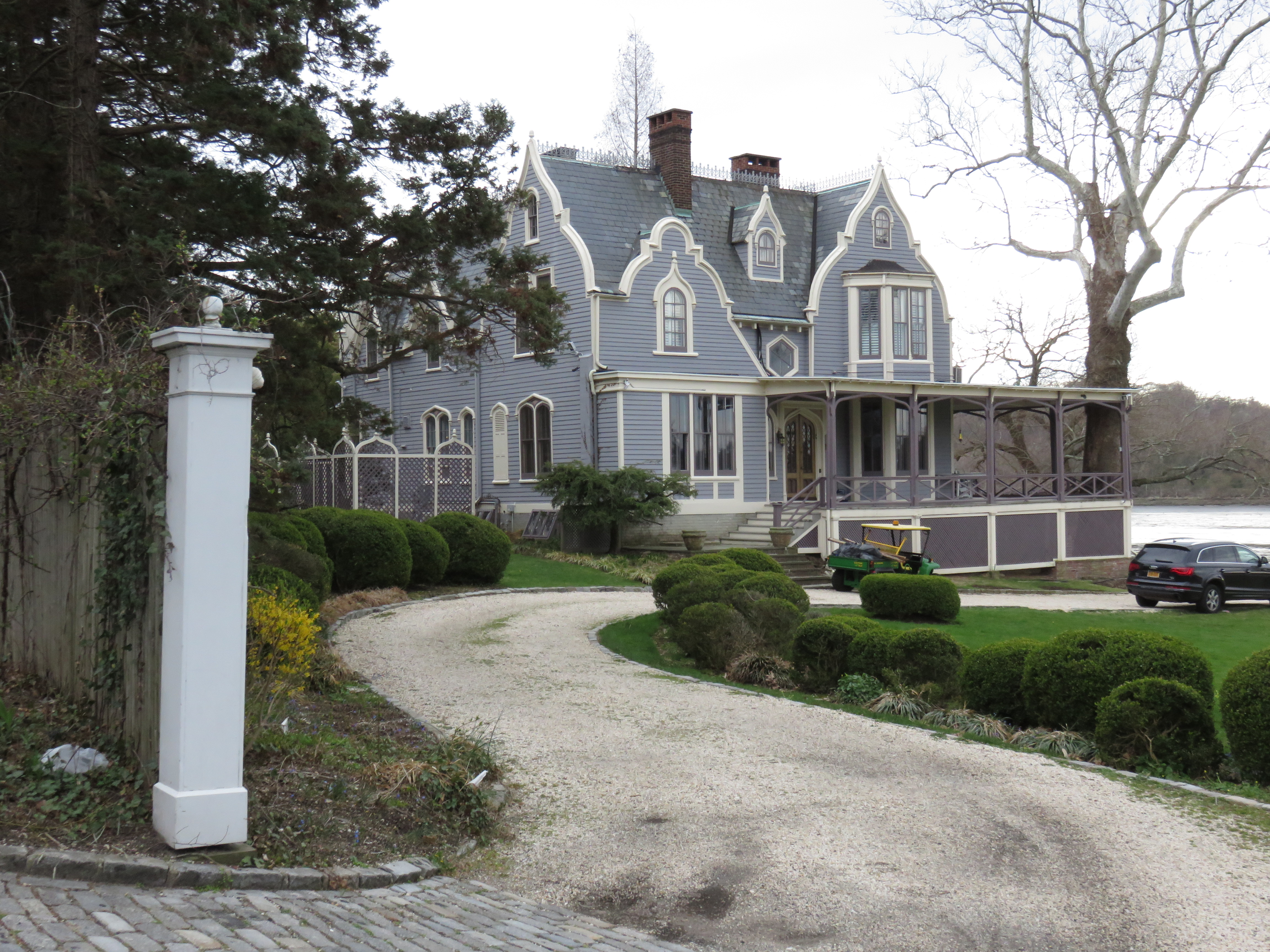

- Location within New York Location within the United States
- Location: 355 Bryant Ave., Roslyn Harbor, New York
- Coordinates: 40°48′44″N 73°38′51″W
- Area: 1 acre (0.40 ha)
- Built: 1863
- Architect: Copley, Frederick S.
- Architectural style: Late Victorian
- MPS: Roslyn Harbor, New York MPS
- NRHP reference No.: 99000874
- Added to NRHP: July 22, 1999

Clifton is a historic mansion located at Roslyn Harbor in Nassau County, New York. The main house is a large, 2 1/2-story, Flemish Revival building constructed about 1863 and altered twice between 1876 and 1932. It features a complex roof plan, including numerous gables in the forms of cross gables, wall dormers and roof dormers, most of which are Flemish gables with bold molding. Also on the property are a contributing boathouse and rustic gazebo.

It was listed on the National Register of Historic Places in 1999.
