= Roslyn Landmark Society =

American nonprofit historical society

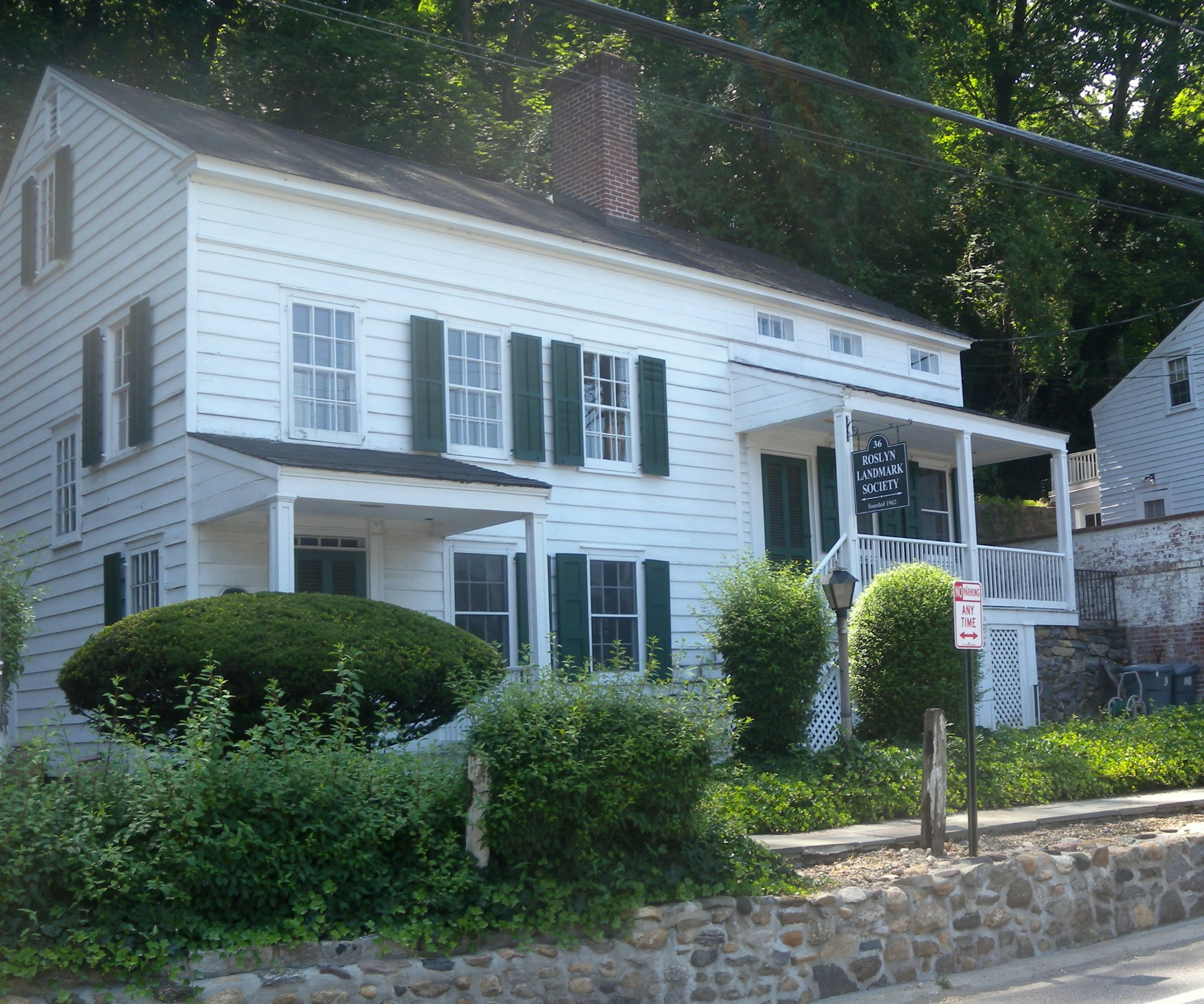
- The Roslyn Landmark Society's headquarters in 2012
- Established: 1961
- Founder: Dr. Roger and Peggy Gerry
- Type: Historical society
- Legal status: Active
- Headquarters: 36 Main Street, Roslyn, NY 11576
- Coordinates: 40°47′56″N 73°39′1″W
- Website: www.roslynlandmarks.org

The Roslyn Landmark Society (also known as RLS) is a nonprofit historical society headquartered at 36 Main Street within the Village of Roslyn, in Nassau County, New York, United States. It serves as the Greater Roslyn area's main historical and landmark society.

== Description ==
The Roslyn Landmark Society was established to preserve the Roslyn area's architectural and cultural integrity – as well as the community's local history – and to otherwise educate the public on the area's history. It serves East Hills, Flower Hill, Greenvale, Roslyn, Roslyn Estates, Roslyn Harbor, and Roslyn Heights – along with small portions of eastern North Hills, western Old Westbury, and southeastern Port Washington. Furthermore, it is one of two main historical societies serving Flower Hill – the other being the Cow Neck Peninsula Historical Society.

RLS additionally gives annual guided walking tours of selected historic properties in Roslyn, and operates a regional heritage trail network covering the history of the entire Greater Roslyn area.

Some of the historic houses within the Greater Roslyn area are protected and landmarked by the Roslyn Landmark Society, through the use of restrictive covenants.

== History ==
The Roslyn Landmark Society was founded in 1961 by Dr. Roger Gerry and his wife, Peggy, when the historic downtown of Roslyn was threatened by destruction associated with urbanization and otherwise by urban renewal.

In the late 2010s, the funds needed were raised to restore the historic Roslyn Grist Mill, which is owned by Nassau County. The project – spearheaded by the Roslyn Landmark Society – had been delayed for several decades by county officials. As part of the project, the property will be restored, and the Roslyn Landmark Society will use it as a museum and an educational and research center. The project is ongoing as of 2026.

During the same decade, the Roslyn Landmark Society was also involved in restoring the two marble horse tamers originally located at Clarence Mackay's former local estate, Harbor Hill. One of the statues was relocated from a backyard in East Hills to its present location in Gerry Park in Roslyn, while its twin at Roslyn High School in Roslyn Heights was restored and rededicated in 2019.

In 2020, the Roslyn Landmark Society was one of the organizations involved in preventing a historic home in East Hills from being demolished.

In July 2026, the Roslyn Landmark Society designed and launched a regional heritage trail system, known as the Roy W. Moger Greater Roslyn Heritage Trail. This heritage trail – one of the largest of its type in the United States – launched with 319 stops and 24 independent routes totaling over 150 miles (240 km) in combined length, covering all communities within the Greater Roslyn area. It was named in honor of longtime Roslyn resident and leader Roy W. Moger – a key figure in the preservation movement in Roslyn in the 20th century.

== Facilities and properties ==
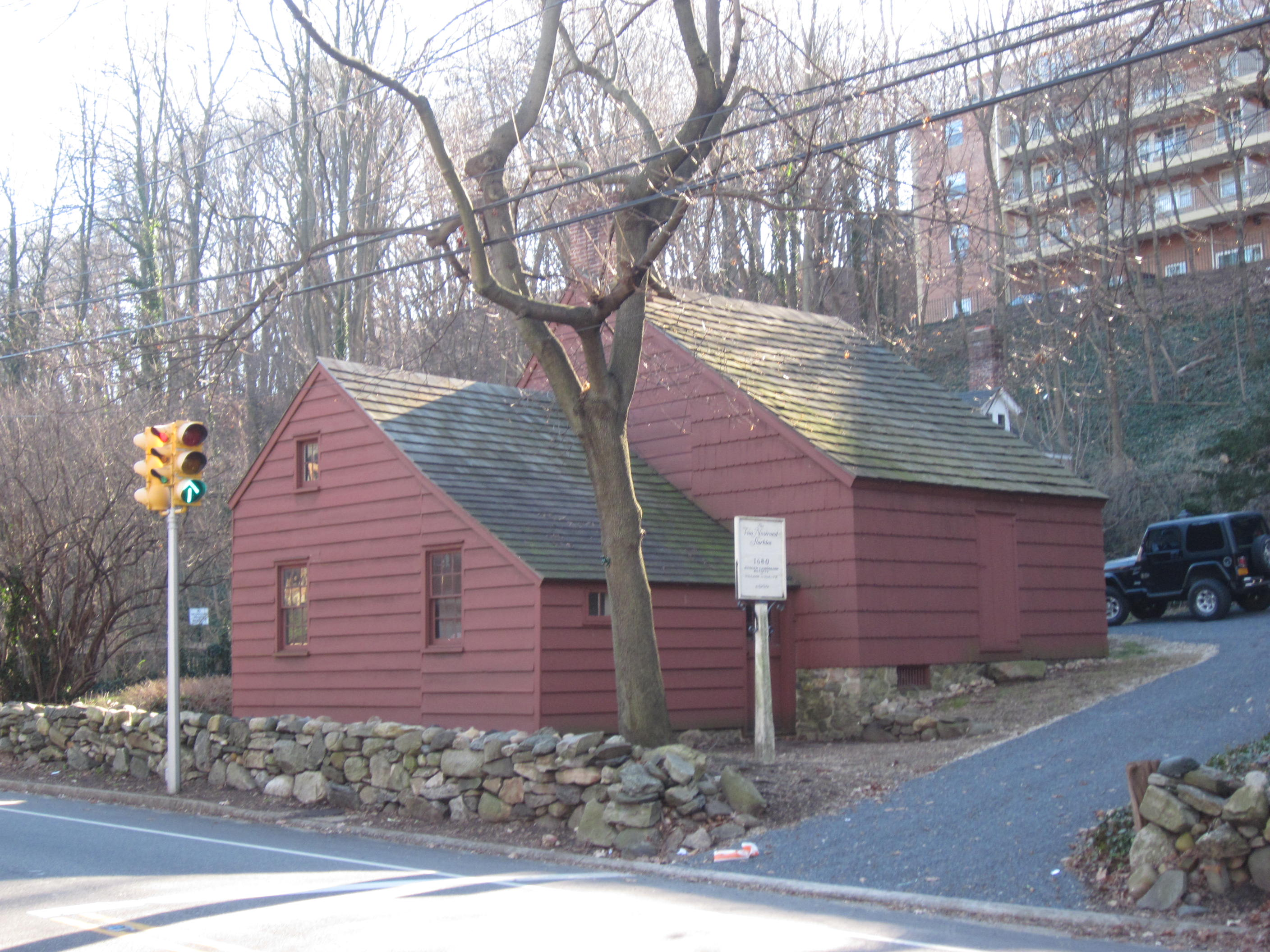
The Van Nostrand-Starkins House in 2011

- George Allen Tenant House – The organization's headquarters; owned by RLS and located within the Village of Roslyn.
- Mackay Estate Gate Lodge – The historic gate lodge to Clarence Mackay's Harbor Hill estate; owned by (and located within) the Village of East Hills and being restored as of 2026 by RLS for use as an educational center.
- Roslyn Grist Mill – A historic grist mill located within the Village of Roslyn; owned by Nassau County and being restored as of 2026 by RLS (which will operate a museum and educational center inside the building upon the completion of the restoration).
- Van Nostrand-Starkins House – A house museum operated by RLS inside the oldest extant building in the Village of Roslyn, built in 1680; owned by the Village of Roslyn and leased to RLS.

=== Covenant properties ===
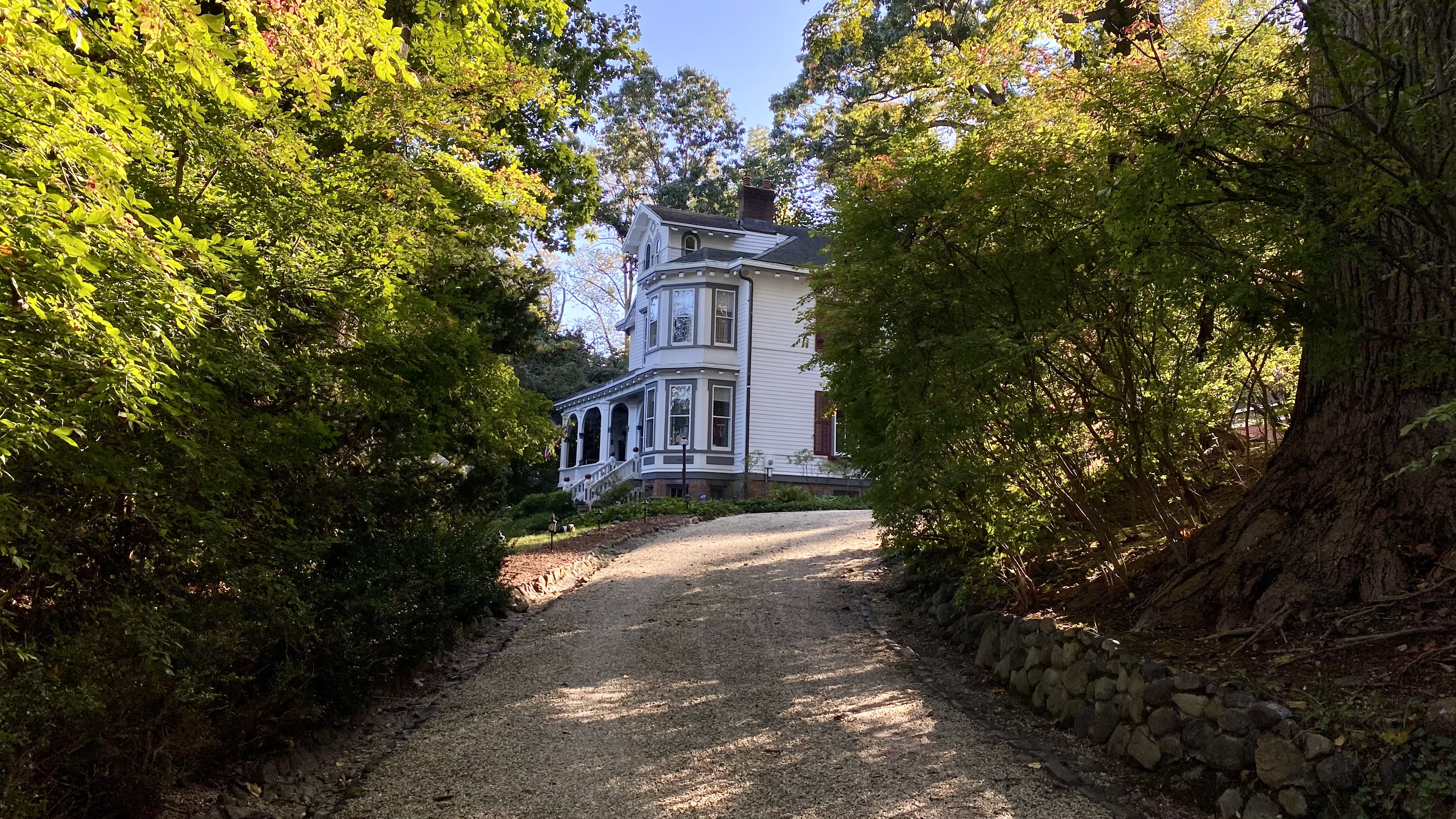
The George W. Denton House in 2020 – one of the 36 properties with RLS covenants

The Roslyn Landmark Society additionally maintains restrictive covenants on a total of 36 properties – including several private, historical residences – located within the villages of Roslyn and Flower Hill and within the hamlets of Greenvale and Roslyn Heights, which legally enforce the preservation of each property.

Notable properties landmarked and preserved through Roslyn Landmark Society covenants include:

- Eastman Cottage (in Roslyn)
- George Allen Tenant House (in Roslyn)
- George W. Denton House (in Flower Hill)
- Roslyn East Gate Toll House (in Greenvale)
- Roslyn House (in Roslyn Heights)

Many of the properties with Roslyn Landmark Society preservation covenants are additionally landmarked on other historic registries – such as the National Register of Historic Places and the New York State Register of Historic Places, along with the municipal registries in the Village of Flower Hill and the Town of North Hempstead.

== Governance and staff ==
The Roslyn Landmark Society is governed by a Board of Trustees. All members of the Board of Trustees are volunteers and serve without compensation. Day-to-day management is handled by professional staff, along with support from volunteers and interns.

As of July 2026, the Co-Presidents of Roslyn Landmark Society are Jordan Fensterman and John Santos. The Co-Vice Presidents are Aviv Fine, Mitchell Schwartz, and Rosanna Wolf. Additionally, the Treasurer is John Flynn, and the Co-Secretaries are John Santos and Noam Shemel.

== See also ==
- List of historical societies in New York (state)
- New York Historical
- Cedarmere-Clayton Estates
- Three Village Historical Society
