= Van Nostrand-Starkins House =

- U.S. Historic district – Contributing property
- New York State Register of Historic Places
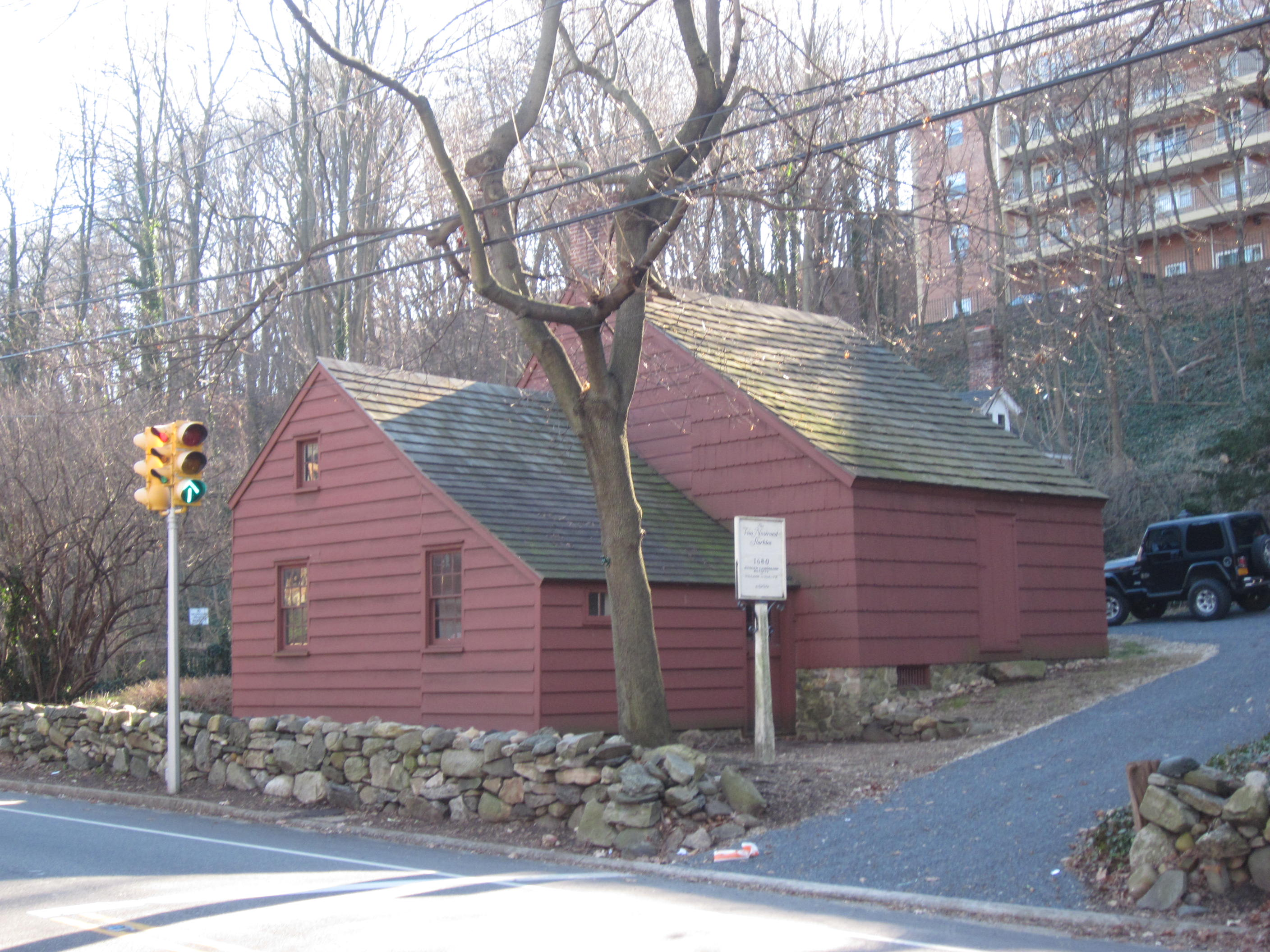
- The Van Nostrand-Starkins House in 2011

- Location within New York Location within the United States
- Location: 221 Main Street, Roslyn, New York
- Coordinates: 40°47′40.5″N 73°38′46.8″W
- Built: c.1680
- MPS: Roslyn Village MRA

Significant dates
- Added to NRHP: January 21, 1974
- Designated NYSRHP: June 23, 1980

The Van Nostrand-Starkins House is a museum and historic house located within the Incorporated Village of Roslyn, in Nassau County, New York, United States.

== Description ==
The house was first constructed in or about 1680, making it the oldest extant structure within the Village of Roslyn. It is a 1.5-story wood structure, with notable Dutch architectural influence – including flaring eaves, H-bent framing, and exposed framing in its living spaces.

The Van Nostrand-Starkins House was listed on the National Register of Historic Places on January 21, 1974. It was subsequently added to the New York State Register of Historic Places on June 23, 1980. It is a contributing property to the Main Street Historic District.

The building is owned by the Village of Roslyn and is leased to the Roslyn Landmark Society, which operates it as a house museum.

== See also ==
- George Allen Tenant House
- Sands-Willets Homestead
- National Register of Historic Places listings in North Hempstead (town), New York
