= Cow Neck Peninsula Historical Society =

American nonprofit historical society

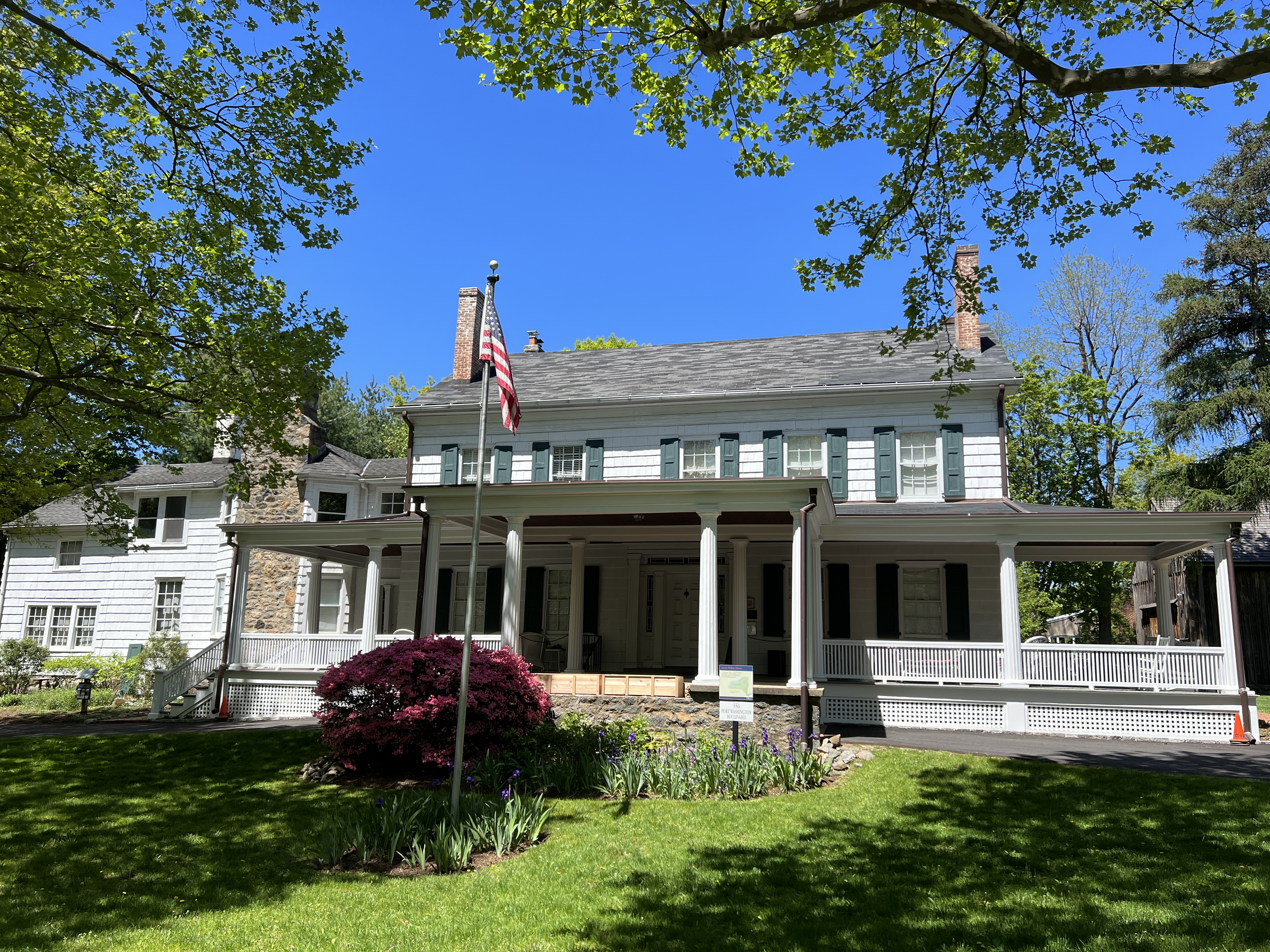
- The Sands-Willets Homestead – the organization's headquarters – in 2023
- Established: 1962
- Type: Historical society
- Legal status: Active
- Purpose: Historical preservation; education
- Headquarters: 336 Port Washington Boulevard, Port Washington, NY 11050; Village of Flower Hill
- Coordinates: 40°48′58.0″N 73°40′49.5″W
- Website: www.cowneck.org

The Cow Neck Peninsula Historical Society (also known simply as Cow Neck, or CNPHS) is a nonprofit historical society headquartered at the Sands-Willets Homestead within the Village of Flower Hill, in Nassau County, New York, United States. It serves as the main historical society for the Cow Neck (Port Washington) Peninsula.

== Description ==
The Cow Neck Peninsula Historical Society was established preserving the history and cultural and historical assets on the Cow Neck Peninsula (Greater Port Washington), and to educate the public on the area's history – and provide history-related programming to the community. It serves the communities on the Cow Neck Peninsula of Long Island, including Baxter Estates, Flower Hill, Manorhaven, Plandome, Plandome Manor, Plandome Heights, Port Washington, Port Washington North, and Sands Point – along with small portions of northern Manhasset and northwestern Roslyn. Furthermore, it is one of two main historical societies serving Flower Hill – the other being the Roslyn Landmark Society.

CNPHS additionally provides annual antique automobile shows and races, maintains an archive, and hosts various festivals throughout the year. It further collaborates with the Town of North Hempstead for some of its events.

=== Collections ===
The society maintains an archive of historical images and artifacts of and from the Greater Port Washington area. Among the most notable artifacts in the organization's collections are various historic charters and documents, along with Sands Point resident John Philip Sousa's parade coat.

== History ==
The Cow Neck Peninsula Historical Society was founded in 1962. In 1967, it acquired its present headquarters in the Village of Flower Hill from the Willets family, and would additionally create a historic house-museum inside the historic home.

In 1978, CNPHS acquired a barn – constructed c.1690 – through donation. Originally located in Sands Point, it was relocated to its present location in Flower Hill, behind the organization's headquarters.

In the 1990s, Cow Neck established its second house-museum, upon taking control of the Thomas Dodge Homestead from the Port Washington Water Pollution Control District.

In the 2020s, the organization spearheaded a project to restore the landmarked Monfort Cemetery in Port Washington.

== Properties ==
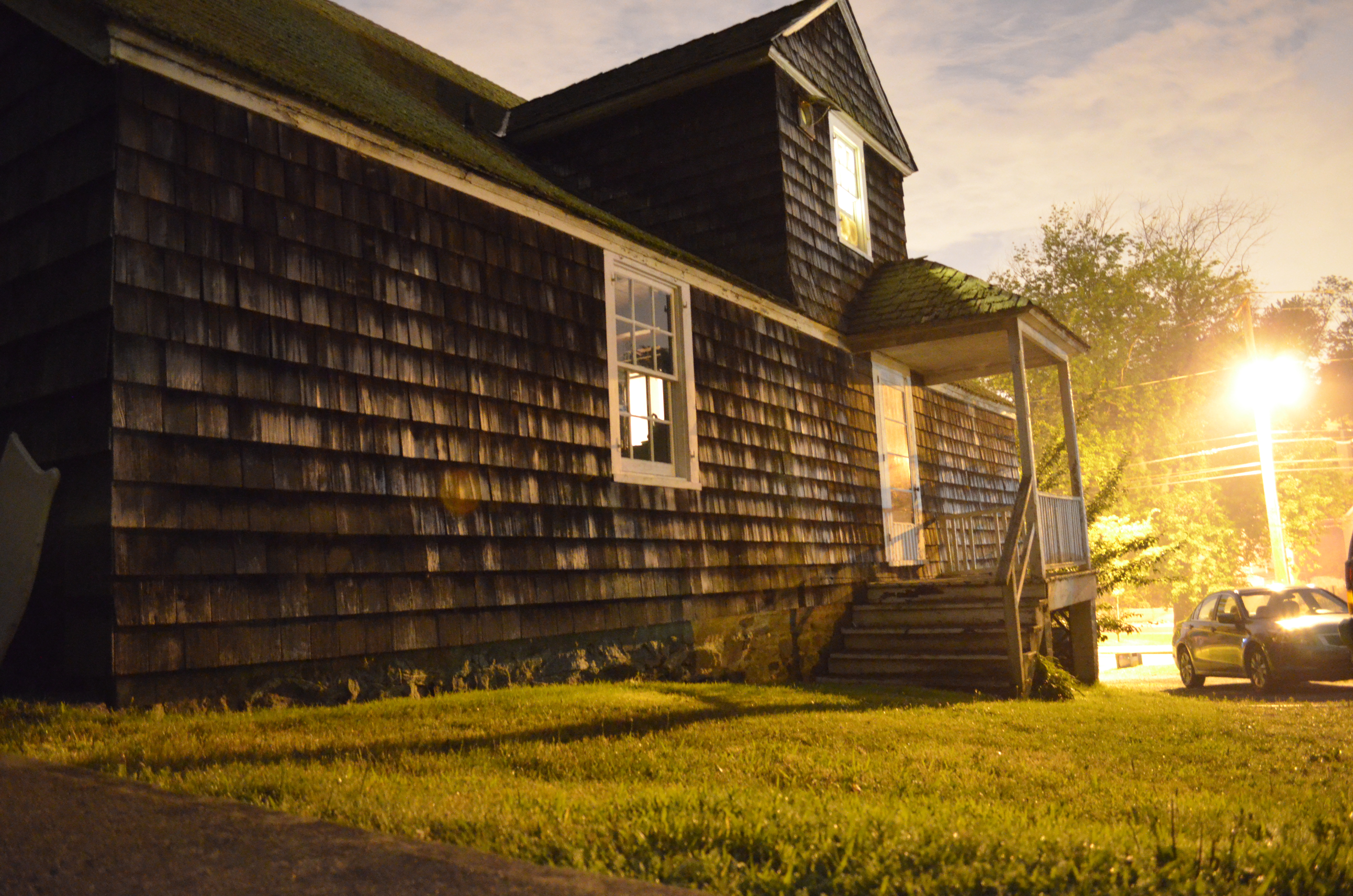
The Thomas Dodge Homestead in 2012

As of 2026, the Cow Neck Peninsula Historical Society owns and maintains the following properties:

- Sands-Willets Homestead – A house-museum and the organization's headquarters, first constructed in or about 1735; located in Flower Hill.
- Sands Barn – A barn erected in or about 1690; located on the Sands-Willets Homestead property in Flower Hill.
- Thomas Dodge Homestead – A house-museum, constructed in 1721; located in Port Washington.

== Notable people ==
- Milton Hopkins – Textbook editor and biologist; former president of the organization.

== See also ==
- List of historical societies in New York (state)
- New York Historical
- Roslyn Landmark Society
- Three Village Historical Society
