= Stephen Hendrickson Everitt =

Stephen Hendrickson Everitt (November 26, 1806 – July 12, 1844) was an American politician, merchant, and speculator.

== Early life ==
Stephen Hendrickson Everitt was born on 26 Nov 1806, in Poughkeepsie, New York, to Abigail DeGraaf, age 36, and Richard Everitt, age 57. The Clinton Home, located at 527 Main Street, was originally the birthplace of Stephen H. Everitt. Today, it serves as a New York State Historical Site and is managed by the Dutchess County Historical Society.

On 17 Oct 1827, Stephen Hendrickson Everitt married Julia Ann Foster in Brooklyn, New York when he was 20 years old. He had two children, Thomas Peter Everitt and Louisa Rachel Everitt.

From 1827 – 1831 Stephen owned and operated a Dry Goods Store on Bowery Street on Long Island, New York. Surrogate Court records in Poughkeepsie state that he went broke and went to Texas to escape debtor’s prison. Stephen abandoned his wife and children with no known divorce found.

In 1834 Stephen arrived in Jasper, State of Coahuila, Mexico.

In January 1835 Stephen Hendrickson Everitt married Alta Zera Williams in Coahuila de Zaragoza, Mexico, when he was 28 years old.

On 28 Feb 1835, Stephen purchased one league of land on Thickety Creek, a branch of Cow Creek that runs into the Sabine River near Nacogdoches, State of Coahuila, Mexico.

On November 25, 1835 Postmaster John Rice Jones awarded Stephen a contract to carry the mail from Jefferson to San Augustine.

In 1835 Stephen Hendrickson Everitt lived in Bevil Precinct (west of Jasper).

== Texas Revolution ==
Stephen was a delegate to the Consultation of 1835 at Columbia from October 16 to 17, 1835, and at San Felipe de Austin from November 1 to 14, 1835.
On 7 Nov 1835, Stephen signed The Consultation of 1835 at San Felipe, Austin Colony, State of Coahuila, Mexico.

Stephen was a delegate to the Convention of 1836 at Washington from March 1 to 17, 1836.

On 02 Mar 1836, Stephen signed the Declaration of Independence of the Republic of Texas at Washington-on-the-Brazos, Austin Colony, State of Coahuila, Mexico that “officially created the Republic of Texas”.

On 17 Mar 1836, Stephen signed the Constitution of the Republic of Texas at Washington-on-the-Brazos, Republic of Texas.

== Republic of Texas Senator ==
1st Congress of The Republic of Texas On 03 Oct 1836 Stephen, who represented the District of Jasper and Jefferson, was elected a Republic of Texas Senator to the 1st Congress. Stephen served as Texas Senator for the Republic of Texas in the 1st Congress at Columbia from October 3, 1836, to December 22, 1836, and at Houston from May 1, 1837, to June 13, 1837. In 1836 Stephen Hendrickson Everitt lived in Texas City, Texas. On October 12, 1836, S.H. Everitt issued a notice in the Telegraph and Texas Register, calling on empresarios to provide the Republic of Texas government with records of land grants they had issued, including the names and numbers of families involved. Shortly after, on October 21, 1836, Everitt, as Chairman of the Committee on Public Lands, sent a letter to Stephen F. Austin requesting copies of all contracts made with Texas colonists. This correspondence aligned with Everitt's earlier newspaper appeal to former Mexican empresarios for the same information. On 21 Oct 1836 a transcript of a letter from SH Everitt as Chairman of Committee on Public Lands to Stephen F Austin asking for copies of all contracts with Texas colonists. Conforms with the newspaper and Everitt ran a few days before asking the same of all former Mexican impresarios.

2nd Congress of The Republic of Texas On 25 Sep 1837 Stephen, who represented the District of Jasper and Jefferson, was elected a Republic of Texas Senator to the 2nd Congress. Stephen served as Texas Senator for the Republic of Texas in the 2nd Congress at Houston during three time periods of September 25, 1837, to November 4, 1837-Called Session, November 6, 1837, to December 19, 1837-Regular Session and April 9, 1838, to May 24, 1838-Adjourned Session. Stephen served as President pro tempore. On 01 Dec 1837 Stephen Everitt wrote an Open Letter to Lamar and others encouraging Mirabeau B. Lamar to replace Sam Houston as president.

3rd Congress of The Republic of Texas On 06 Nov 1838 Stephen, who represented the District of Jasper and Jefferson, was elected a Republic of Texas Senator to the 3rd Congress. Stephen served as Texas Senator for the Republic of Texas in the 3rd Congress at Houston from November 6, 1838, to January 24, 1839. Stephen served as President pro tempore.

On 25 Jan 1839 in Houston, the Third Congress of the Republic of Texas adopted the official Republic of Texas flag. The legislation was signed into law by President Mirabeau B. Lamar, establishing the flag as a symbol of the republic.

4th Congress of The Republic of Texas On 01 Nov 1839 Stephen, who represented the District of Jasper and Jefferson, was elected a Republic of Texas Senator to the 4th Congress. Stephen served as Texas Senator for the Republic of Texas in the 4th Congress at Austin from November 11, 1839, to February 5, 1840.

5th Congress of The Republic of Texas On 02 Nov 1840 Stephen, who represented the District of Jasper and Jefferson, was elected a Republic of Texas Senator to the 5th Congress. Stephen served as Texas Senator for the Republic of Texas in the 5th Congress at Austin from November 2, 1840, to February 5, 1841. On 09 Dec 1840 Stephen resigned from the 5th Congress, Republic of Texas Senate.

== Businessman ==
In 1841 Stephen became a merchant at Bevilport, west of Jasper.

With his Bevilport business thriving, from 1842-1844 Stephen laid out the City of the Pass, near present-day Sabine Pass. There he conducted an export-import business. He was engaged in expanding his facilities by building wharves and warehouses on Doom Island (now underwater in Sabine Lake about 1800 feet SW of Stewts Island) at the mouth of the Neches River near the City of Pass. On 31 Aug 1843 Dr. Everitt in New York City, deeded half of his extensive real estate properties in Texas to brother James Carr Everitt of New York City to resolve his prior debts.

On 11 Jul 1844, Stephen took a business trip to New Orleans and stayed in the St. Charles Hotel, 215 St. Charles at New Orleans, Orleans, Louisiana, USA. The St. Charles hotel burned down many times over the years.

== Death and probated will ==
Death. On July 12, 1844, Stephen Hendrickson Everitt died in New Orleans, Louisiana, when he was 37 years old. Stephen was found dead on 12 Jul 1844 at 1:00 PM in the St. Charles Hotel from yellow fever as reported in obituaries published in the New Orleans Picayune newspaper on 13 Jul 1844 and in The New Orleans Bee newspaper on 13 Jul 1844.

Buried. On 14 Jul 1844 Stephen was buried at Girod Street Cemetery; now defunct. It was located between 1450 Girod Street and 1450 Poydras Street; near the present-day Champions Square Parking Garage just outside the Superdome.

Probated Will. Stephen H. Everitt's will took 12 years to probate from 1844 to 1856. On 03 Aug 1844 SH Everitt's estate was inventoried in New Orleans, Orleans, Louisiana, US. On 05 Aug 1844 an accounting of everything in the possession of SH Everitt when he unexpectedly died in a New Orleans hotel. A leather trunk of clothing, an umbrella, a gold watch, a US Treasury Note for $100, various letters, a deed for a Mexican land grant, and partnership papers with Z. William Eddy, who worked for Everitt at his dry goods store in Texas and who was the executor of Everitt's estate in Texas. On 10 Sep 1844, Z. William Eddy of New York City, New York was the administrator of Mr. Everitt's estate. On 25 Nov 1856 Stephen H Everitt's Will was finally probated at Jasper, Jasper, Texas, US. The estate was divided between the following heirs of Mr. (Peter) Everitt: Louisa R. Broad, William Hendrickson Everitt, Sarah Ann Everitt, and James C. Everitt. (Book L, pp 69- 70, Deed Records of Jefferson County).

State of Texas Centennial Marker. On 02 March 1936 a State of Texas Centennial Marker was erected for Stephen H. Everitt on the west side of FM1747 near Jasper, Texas.

Reinterment. In 1957 Stephen H Everitt's remains were reinterred at St. John Cemetery (Hope Mausoleum), 4841 Canal Street, New Orleans, Orleans, Louisiana, USA (was buried in Girod Cemetery, now defunct).
