= Eastman Cottage =

Historic house in New York, United States

- U.S. National Register of Historic Places
- New York State Register of Historic Places
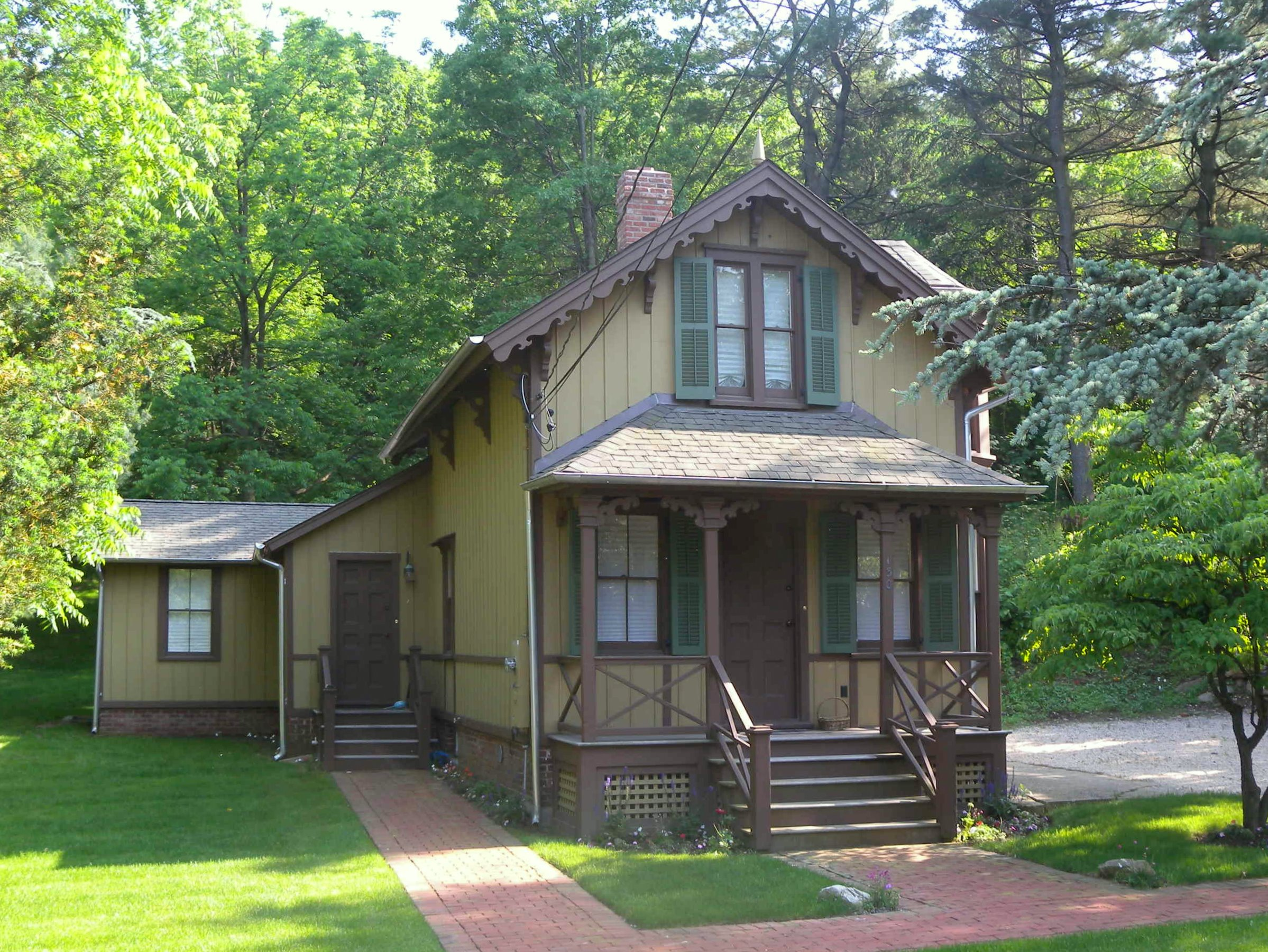
- The front of the house, as seen from the street

- Location within New York Location within the United States
- Location: 130 Mott Ave., Roslyn, New York
- Coordinates: 40°48′10″N 73°39′15″W
- Area: less than one acre
- Built: 1870
- Architectural style: Picturesque cottage
- MPS: Roslyn Village MRA
- NRHP reference No.: 86002635

Significant dates
- Added to NRHP: October 2, 1986
- Designated NYSL: August 15, 1986

The Eastman Cottage is a historic home located in the Incorporated Village of Roslyn in Nassau County, New York, United States.

== Description ==
It was built about 1870 and is a 1 1/2-story picturesque cottage in the tradition of Andrew Jackson Downing and Calvert Vaux. It is rectangular in plan, with a small gabled kitchen wing and an attached privy or woodshed. It features board and batten siding and a hip-roofed front porch supported by four columns with scroll-sawn brackets. It is the only survivor of three similar cottages at this location.

It was listed on both the National Register of Historic Places and the New York State Register of Historic Places in 1986.

== See also ==
- National Register of Historic Places listings in North Hempstead (town), New York
- Roslyn House
