= St. Lawrence County Historical Association =

- Founded: 1947
- Location: Canton
- Region served: St. Lawrence County
- Product: Silas Wright Museum
- Key people: Executive Director: Carlene Bermann; Engagement & Advancement Coordinator: Megan Royce; Administrative Assistant & Museum Attendant: Caitlin Layaw; Building & Grounds Keeper: Sara Lynch; Custodian: Becky Buckley; Collections Manager: Currently Vacant; Archives Manager: Currently Vacant
- Website: http://www.slcha.org

The St. Lawrence County Historical Association (SLCHA) is a non-profit organization, notable for owning and operating the Silas Wright Museum. It preserves the history of St. Lawrence County.

== History ==
The Association was first founded in 1947, and was chartered in 1955. In 1965, the Association's archives began being stored in a Baptist church in Richville. The Silas Wright Museum was opened in 1978 and the archives were moved there. The Association was accredited by the American Alliance of Museums in 1982.

== See also ==
- List of historical societies in New York (state)
