= George W. Denton House =

Historic house in Flower Hill, New York, United States

- George Washington Denton House
- U.S. National Register of Historic Places
- New York State Register of Historic Places
- Village of Flower Hill Landmark
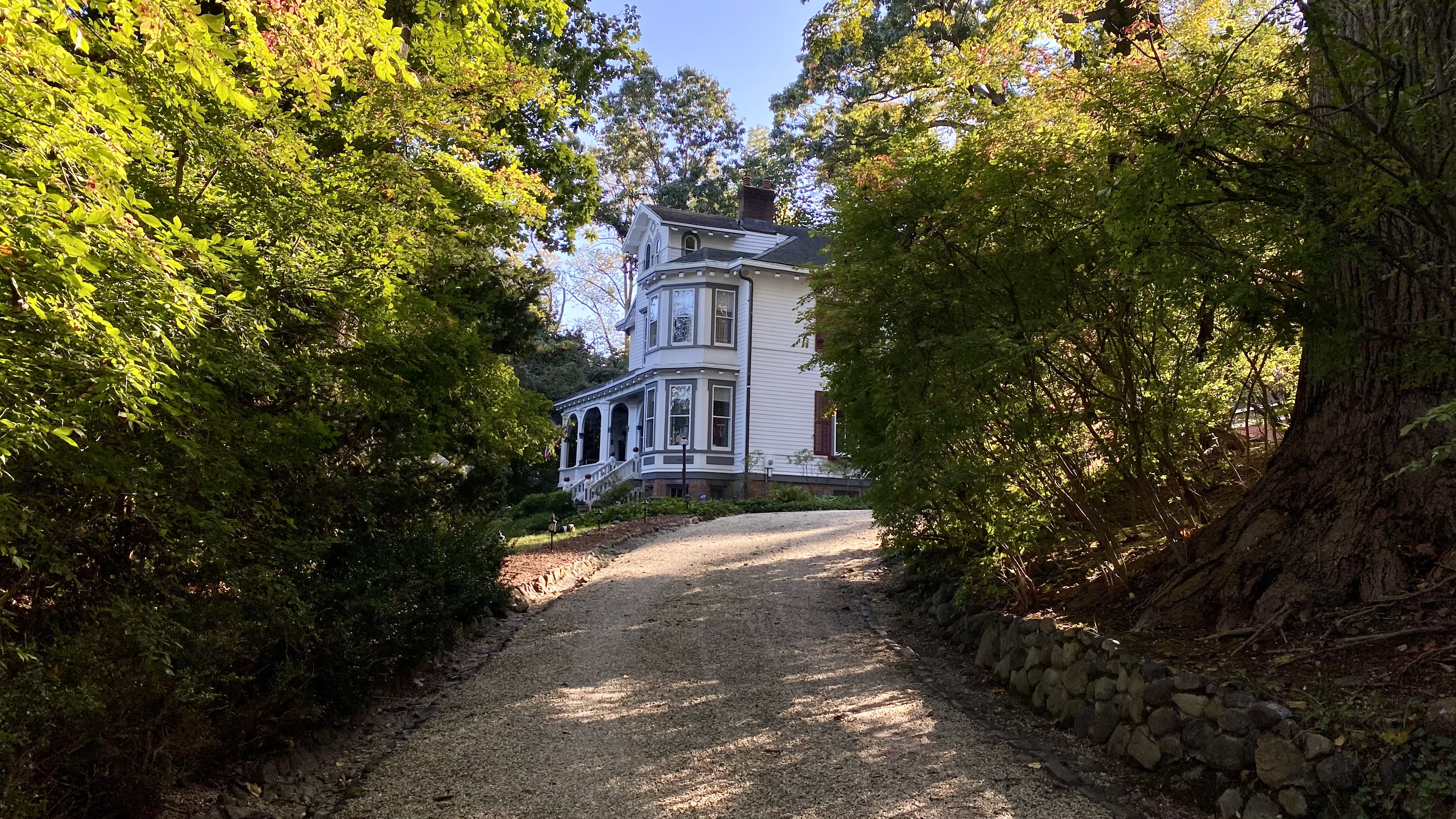
- The George Washington Denton House, as seen in October of 2020.

- Location within Long Island Location within New York Location within the United States
- Location: 57 West Shore Road, Flower Hill, New York
- Coordinates: 40°48′16″N 73°39′19″W
- Area: 2 acres (0.81 ha)
- Built: 1873 - 1875
- Architectural style: Italian Villa
- NRHP reference No.: 85001937

Significant dates
- Added to NRHP: August 29, 1985
- Designated NYSRHP: June 27, 1985
- Designated VFHL: November 4, 1996

The George Washington Denton House (also known as the Greta–Theo Holiday House) is a historic home located in the Incorporated Village of Flower Hill, in Nassau County, on Long Island, in New York, United States. It was built sometime between 1873 and 1875. It was listed on the National Register of Historic Places in 1985 and was designated a Village of Flower Hill Historic Landmark in 1996.

== Description ==
The home is a rectangular, 2-story wood-frame building with a two-stage rear service ell in a vernacular Italian Villa style. It features a 2 1/2-story engaged tower, semi-octagonal bay windows, and an L-shaped wraparound verandah.

Also on the property is a brick ice house built into the side of a hill.

The Long Island Rail Road's 1877 guidebook, "Long Island & Where to Go", made mention of this home; the George Washington Denton House is one of four places of interest in the Roslyn area to be mentioned in this publication.

The home is featured in the Roslyn Landmark Society's 1986 house tour guide, on pages 414 through 423.

== History ==
The house was built at some point between 1873 and 1875 by lawyer George Washington Denton.

In 1919, Allene Tew Buchard, a socialite from Locust Valley and the wife of Anson Wood Buchard, purchased the Denton House and the rest of the property. She named the house the Greta–Theo Holiday House; she named it after her daughter Greta and her son Theodore – both of whom died one year earlier from the Spanish Flu.

In 1930, Buchard donated the property to the Girls' Service League of America, following her husband's 1927 death. She donated the property upon moving to Europe after remarrying to Prince Heinrich XXXIII.

== See also ==
- The Sands-Willets Homestead – Another historic house located within the Village of Flower Hill.
