= Onondaga Historical Association =

Historical association in New York, United States

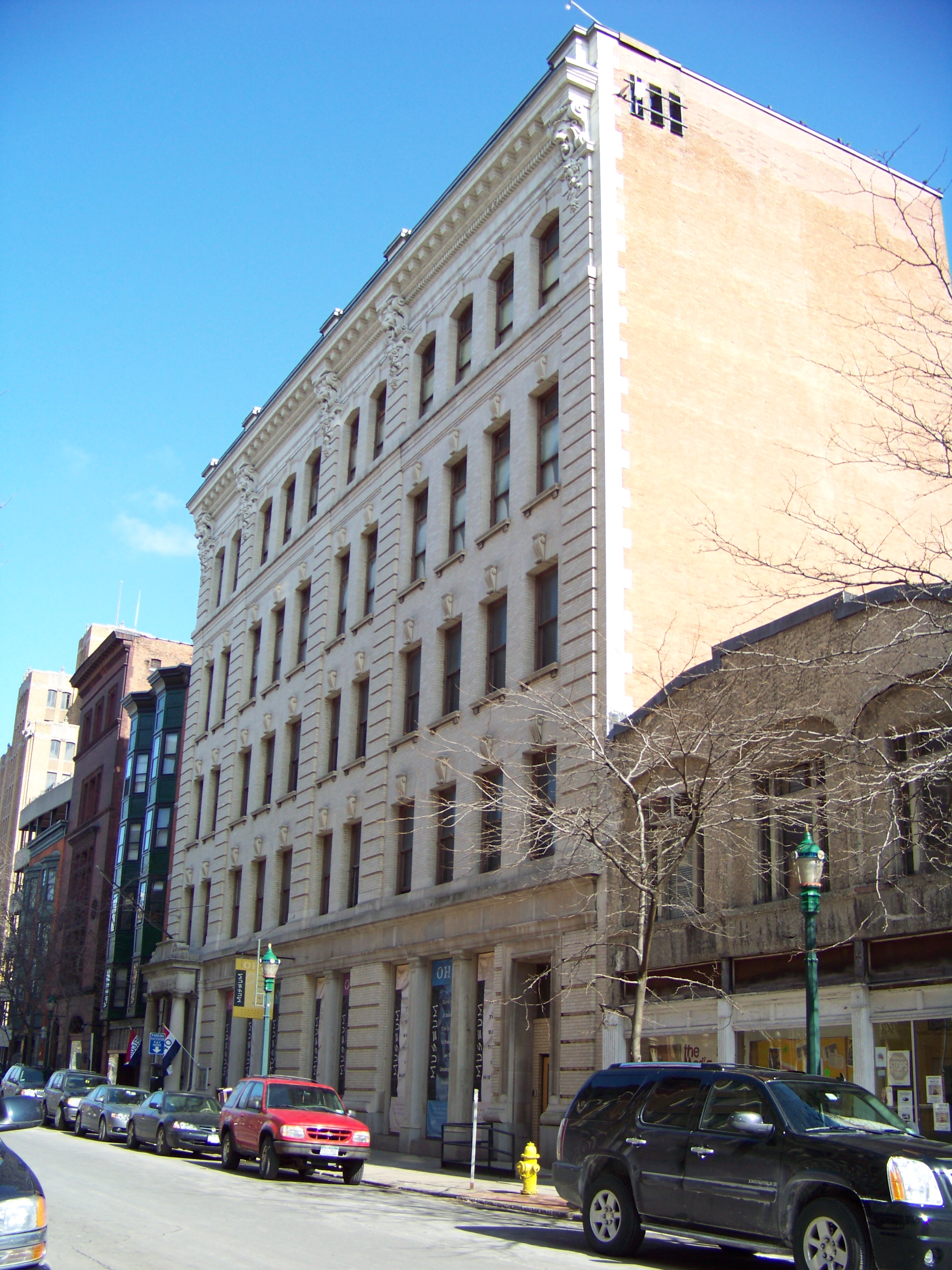
The Onondaga Historical Association's main building at 321 Montgomery St., Syracuse, NY.

The Onondaga Historical Association (OHA) is a private nonprofit entity that operates as a research center on the history of Onondaga County, with museums, educational centers, retail operations, and exhibits at multiple locations throughout Onondaga County. Founded in 1862, OHA's mission is to preserve the history of Central New York and encourage the Onondaga County community to appreciate and utilize its history.

OHA was first founded amid the Civil War to preserve history at a time that history was "washing in and out of recognition," according to a 2013 Syracuse Post-Standard article.

OHA runs multiple other entities, such as the Skä•noñh: Great Law of Peace Center, which preserves the culture of the Haudenosaunee — the endonym which the Iroquois Nation is also known as. Other extensions of the OHA include the Sainte Marie Among the Iroquois Mission Site Museum, which exhibits a recreation of the Sainte Marie de Gannentaha Jesuit mission, and the Brewseum at Heritage Hill, which showcases the area's brewery history. OHA also holds other exhibits throughout the Onondaga County community.

== History ==
The Onondaga Historical Association was officially incorporated into New York state in 1863 by the New York state legislature. For a not-for-profit corporation to be incorporated into New York state, it needs to file a Certificate of Incorporation with the Department of State. OHA's corporation charter states that OHA was created to preserve and collect genealogical, historical, literary and scientific material.

OHA has undergone multiple building changes and renovations. OHA has had multiple locations, its first being Corinthian Hall on North Salina Street until 1866. In 1866, OHA moved to a new building on the Clinton Block, then in 1871, the building was again moved to the Wieting Block.

In the mid-1870s, the OHA experienced economic trouble with the public being rather inactive and uninterested in the association. OHA's collection in Wieting Hall was put into storage elsewhere, where it remained for more than 15 years. In July 1881, the Wieting Block was completely destructed by a fire — most of OHA's collections were preserved due to their storage but some OHA artifacts, such as books and early records, were lost in the fire.

In 1890, a Syracuse Post-Standard article revived the community's interest in the OHA. In 1894, its collection was taken out of storage and opened for public viewing in exhibit rooms in the Syracuse Savings Bank building.

OHA's building at 311 Montgomery St. was built in 1896, and was purchased by the association in 1905 with funds gifted by William Kirkpatrick, who was a long-time supporter of the corporation. In 1980, OHA purchased 321 Montgomery St., which was previously the New York Telephone Building. The two buildings on Montgomery St. housed the OHA's collection for nearly 25 years.

In 2005, OHA's building at 311 Montgomery St. was sold to Russ Andrews, a Syracuse businessman, and his wife, Linda Henley, for $80,000. Until the renovated building was shown to the public in a 2011 ribbon cutting ceremony, the building had been "bricked up for years." The portion of the collection housed in the 311 building moved to the 321 building.

The building at 321 Montgomery St. remains as OHA's main location as of 2024. It has undergone multiple renovations, as the association works to expand. OHA also operates at multiple additional sites.

== Founders ==
Some of the key founders of the Onondaga Historical Association were Henry D. Didama, James Noxon, Homer DeLois Sweet, and John A. Green. They were recognized as influential members of the Syracuse community.

Henry D. Didama

Didama, born in 1823, was a physician who was involved with St. Joseph's Hospital from its origins. He studied at Cazenovia Seminary and began to practice in medicine under Dr. David A. Moore. He completed his education at Albany Medical School in 1846 and moved to Syracuse in 1851. Didama earned the highest honor of law degrees, an LL.D., at Syracuse University and also became the dean of SU's College of Medicine. He was also the president and a member of the Onondaga County Medical Society. Didama was deeply involved in the medical industry of the central New York area for the remainder of his life.

James Noxon

Noxon was a lawyer who eventually went on to represent New York state as a Senator. He was originally from Onondaga County, New York and pursued law as his father, B. Davis Noxon, did. His father was well known in the Syracuse area for his legal knowledge and skill, as well as his anti-abolitionist beliefs. Noxon then went on to earn his way into the New York bar and later became a senator.

Homer DeLois Sweet

Sweet was born in Onondaga County, New York in 1826. He was a civil engineer and map maker who surveyed Onondaga County. He was also the author of several books, such as Philosophy of English Versification and Twilight Hours in the Adirondacks. He was involved in projects in the Syracuse area and served as a secretary for the OHA.

John A. Green

Green was born in 1828 and was a businessman who worked in grocery retail. He was also a member of the New York National Guard and held a position as a brigadier general. During the Civil War he guarded the upstate New York area.

== Museums ==
The Onondaga Historical Association maintains several different locations. The Onondaga Historical Museum and Gift Gallery store are located in downtown Syracuse, New York, along with the Richard and Carolyn Wright Research Center. These locations, as well as the OHA administrative office, can be found on 321 Montgomery Street.

Liverpool, New York houses additional locations such as the Skä•noñh – Great Law of Peace Center and Gift Gallery and the St. Marie Among the Iroquois Mission Site Museum. These sites can be found at Onondaga Lake Park.

The Skä•noñh – Great Law of Peace Center is a location where the culture of the Haudenosaunee Confederacy is taught and celebrated.

The Sainte Marie Among the Iroquois Mission Site educates visitors about the Sainte Marie de Gannentaha Jesuit mission. The French Jesuit mission, which occurred from 1656 to 1658, took place on Onondaga Lake's eastern shore. The museum offers historical information and a replica of the original mission site, which was equipped with a chapel, sleeping quarters, blacksmith's and carpenter's shops, and a kitchen.

The Brewseum at Heritage Hill showcases antique and rare items that reflect pre-Prohibition era breweries. The museum operates alongside the Heritage Hill Brewhouse, which offers handcrafted beer from its property that also has an active crop and animal farm. The Brewseum also has a retail shop where customers can purchase merchandise related to local breweries.

== Exhibits and events ==
The Onondaga Historical Association hosts a plethora of events and exhibits. One event, “Walking and Talking Wednesdays,” starts at noon on Wednesdays and takes guests on a tour that spans Syracuse's downtown and its history.

One of Onondaga Historical Museum's permanent exhibits is entitled “Freedom Bound: Syracuse & The Underground Railroad.” It dives into the history of Underground Railroad stops in Syracuse and highlights the stories of those who evaded slavery.

Another permanent exhibit entitled “From Laying the Foundation to Forging Ahead: Jewish Contributions to Syracuse & Onondaga County” focuses on the rich Jewish history of the Syracuse area and the cultural contributions of Jewish communities in the area.

One additional permanent exhibit at the museum is called “Onondaga County: The Heart of New York” and covers the broader history of the area, including topics such as Native American life, the Erie Canal, local industries, and the railroad. This exhibit covers past life as well as present life in Syracuse.

While these are just a portion of the exhibits offered at the Onondaga Historical Museum, there are many more permanent and temporary exhibits to check out and learn about Syracuse, New York's history.

== See also ==
- List of historical societies in New York (state)
