= George Allen Tenant House =

- U.S. Historic district – Contributing property
- New York State Register of Historic Places
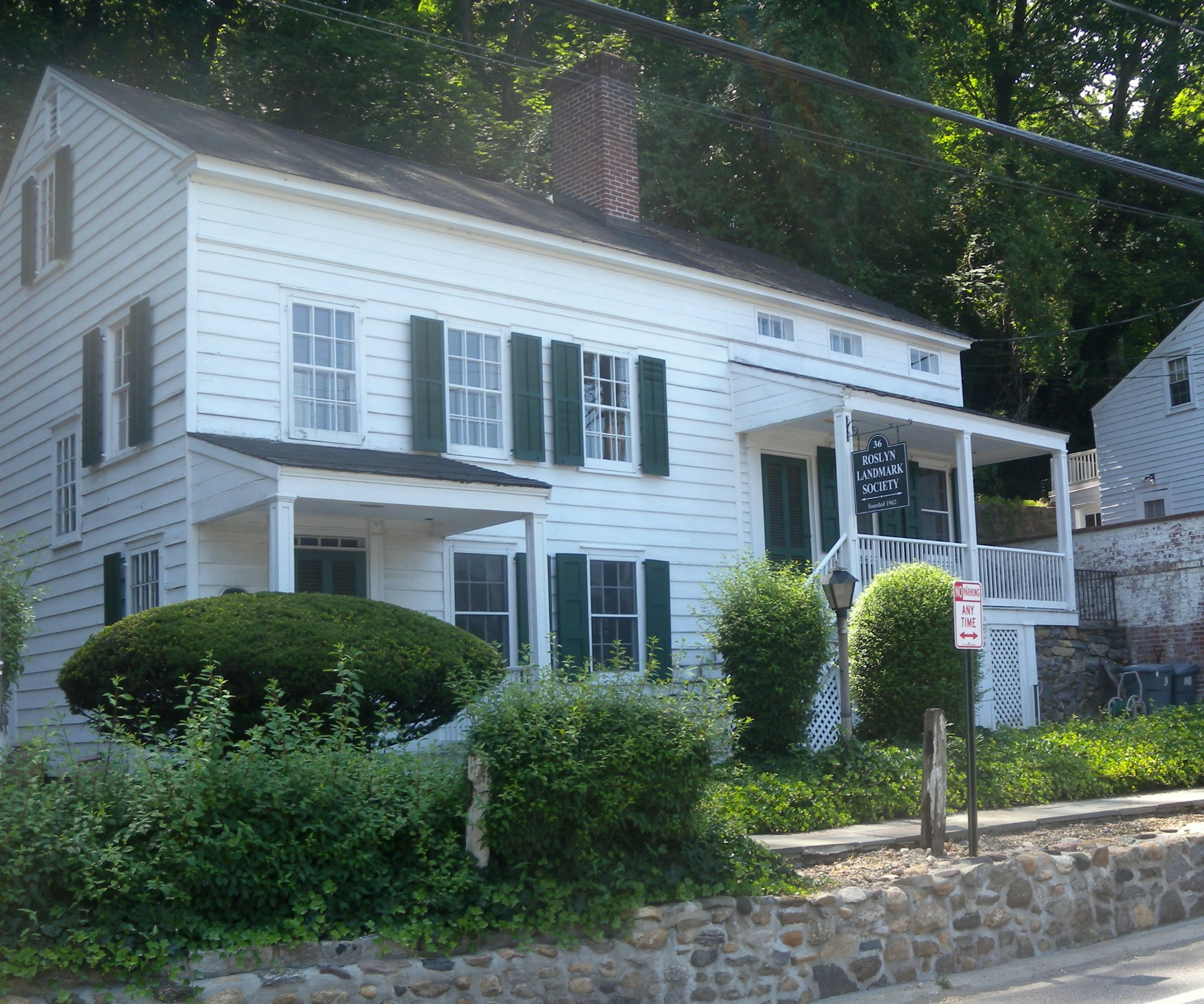
- The George Allen House in 2012

- Location within New York Location within the United States
- Location: 36 Main Street, Roslyn, New York
- Coordinates: 40°47′56.2″N 73°39′01.2″W
- Area: less than one acre
- Built: 1835
- MPS: Roslyn Village MRA

Significant dates
- Added to NRHP: January 21, 1974
- Designated NYSRHP: June 23, 1980

The George Allen Tenant House (also known as the George Allen House) is a historic building located within the Incorporated Village of Roslyn, in Nassau County, New York, United States.

== Description ==
The earliest portions of the George Allen Tenant House were constructed in or about 1835.

It was listed on the National Register of Historic Places on January 21, 1974. It was subsequently added to the New York State Register of Historic Places on June 23, 1980. On April 15, 1987, it became a contributing property to the Roslyn Village Historic District.

As of 2026, the building serves as the headquarters for the Roslyn Landmark Society, which has a restrictive covenant on the property ensuring its preservation.

== See also ==
- Main Street Historic District (Roslyn, New York)
- National Register of Historic Places listings in North Hempstead (town), New York.
