= Thomas Dodge Homestead =

Historic house in New York, United States

- U.S. National Register of Historic Places
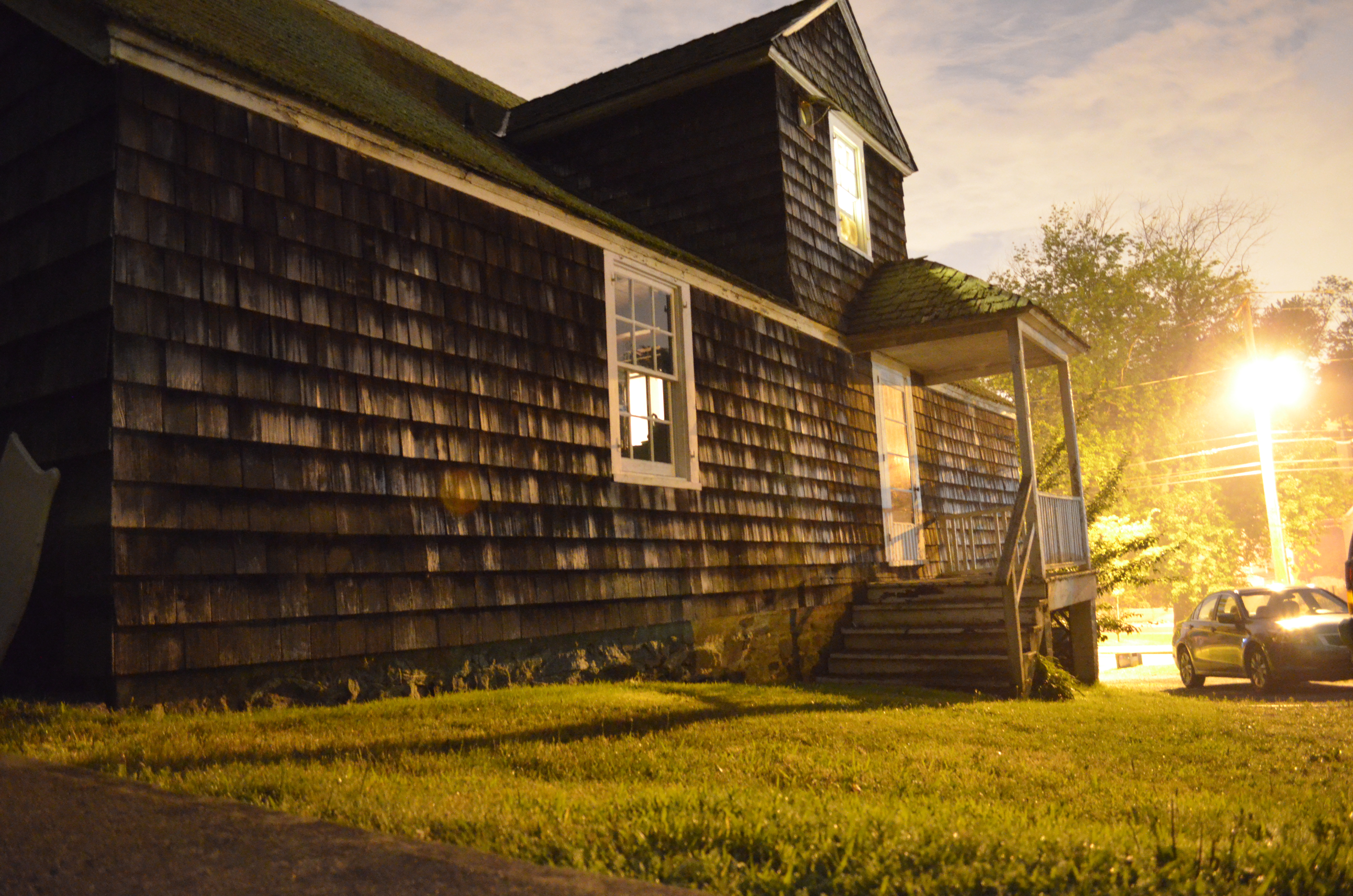

- Location within New York Location within the United States
- Location: 58 Harbor Rd., Port Washington, New York
- Coordinates: 40°50′20″N 73°41′51″W
- Area: 1 acre (0.40 ha)
- Built: 1721
- NRHP reference No.: 86001387
- Added to NRHP: June 26, 1986

The Thomas Dodge Homestead is a historic home in Port Washington, Nassau County, New York.

== Description ==
It is a settlement-era farmhouse dated to 1721 with additions completed in approximately 1750 and 1903. It is a 1 1/2-story, L-shaped, heavy timber-frame building sheathed with natural cedar wood shingles. The main block has a saltbox shape and there is a nearly square, 1 1/2-story gable-roofed wing. Also on the property are a contributing barn (1880), privy (1886), chicken coop, and shed. It is operated as a historic house museum by the Cow Neck Peninsula Historical Society, which has its headquarters in the Sands-Willets Homestead, another historic house museum.

Thomas Dodge Homestead was listed on the National Register of Historic Places in 1986.

== See also ==
- Sands-Willets Homestead
- Sands Barn
- Main Street School
- Monfort Cemetery
