= List of historical societies in New York (state) =

The following is a list of historical societies in the state of New York, United States.

== Organizations ==
Cover of the 1891 Proceedings of the Jefferson County historical society, Watertown, New York

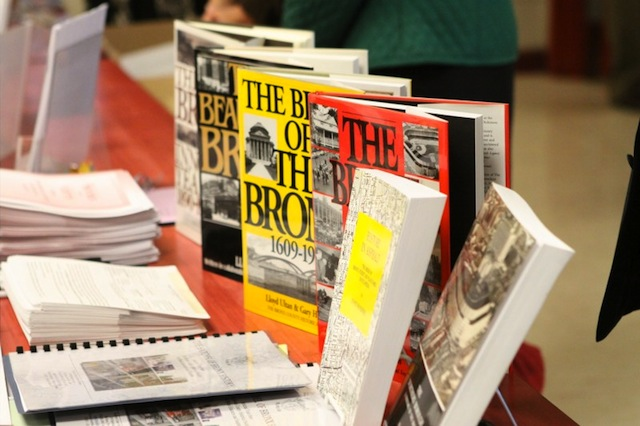
Publications of the Bronx County Historical Society, New York, 2014

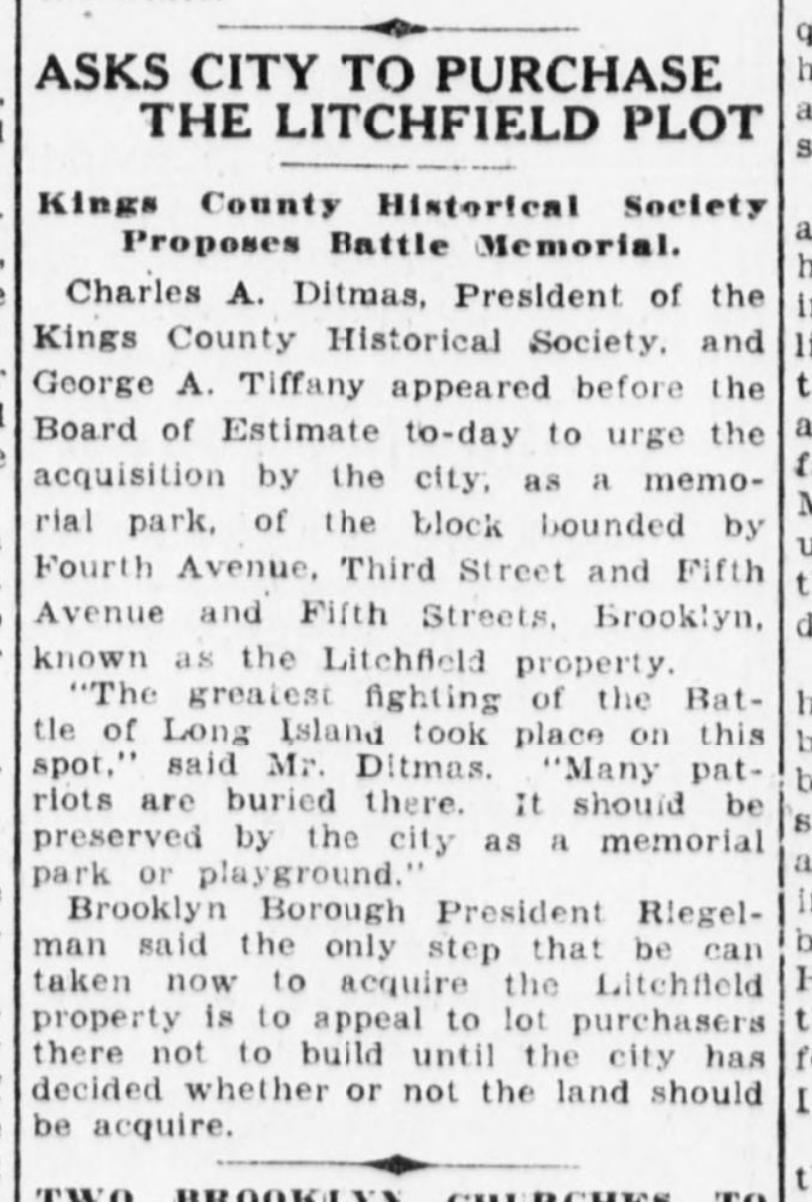
1922 Evening World newspaper item about the Kings County Historical Society, New York

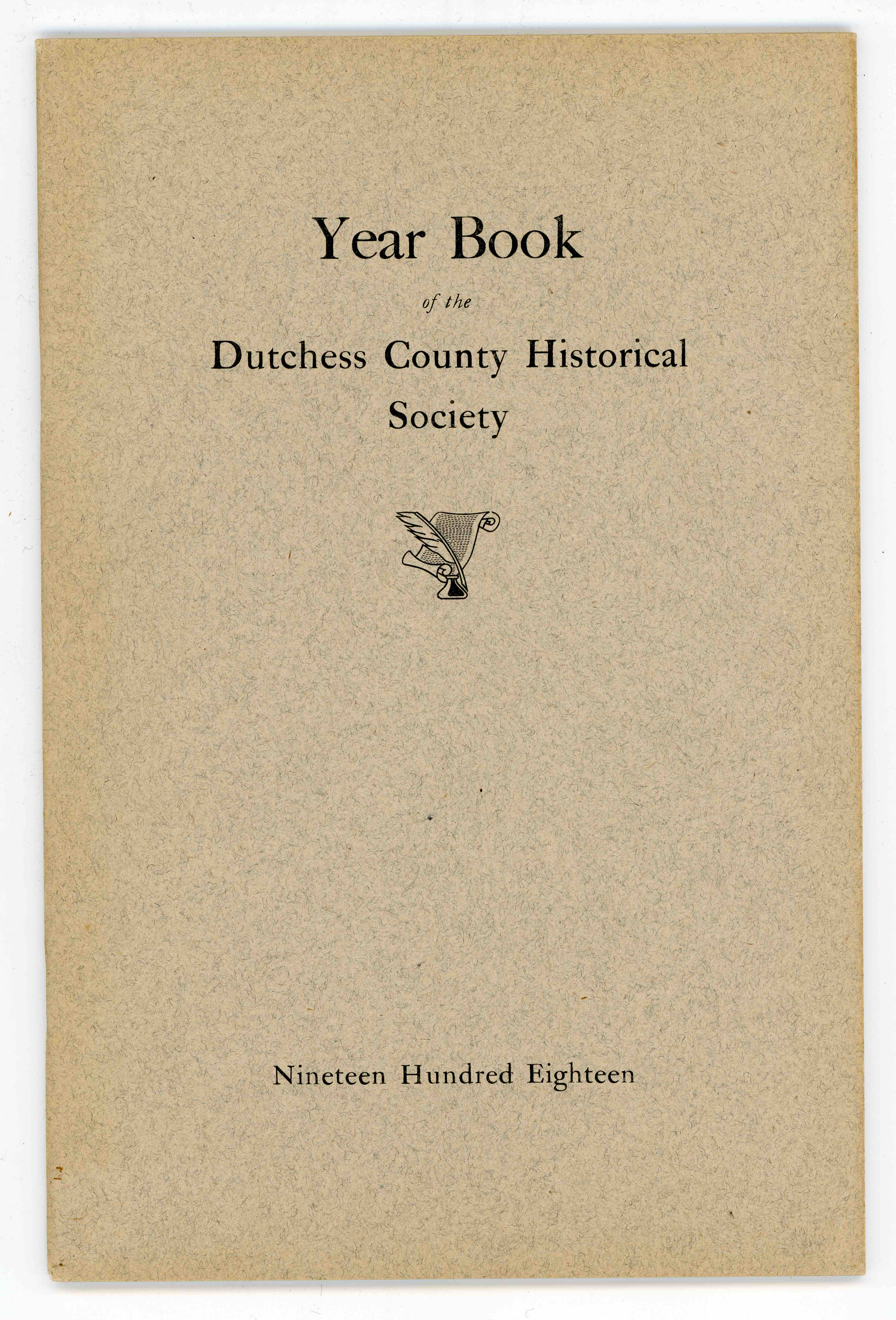
Cover of the 1918 Year Book of the Dutchess County Historical Society, New York state

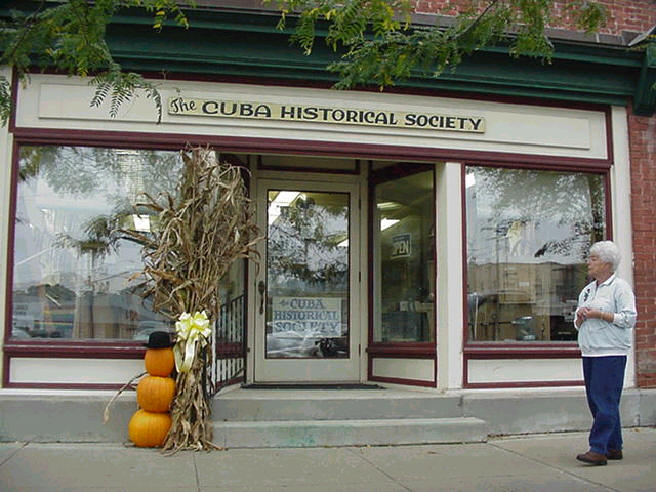
Cuba Historical Society building, in Cuba, New York state (photo 2005)

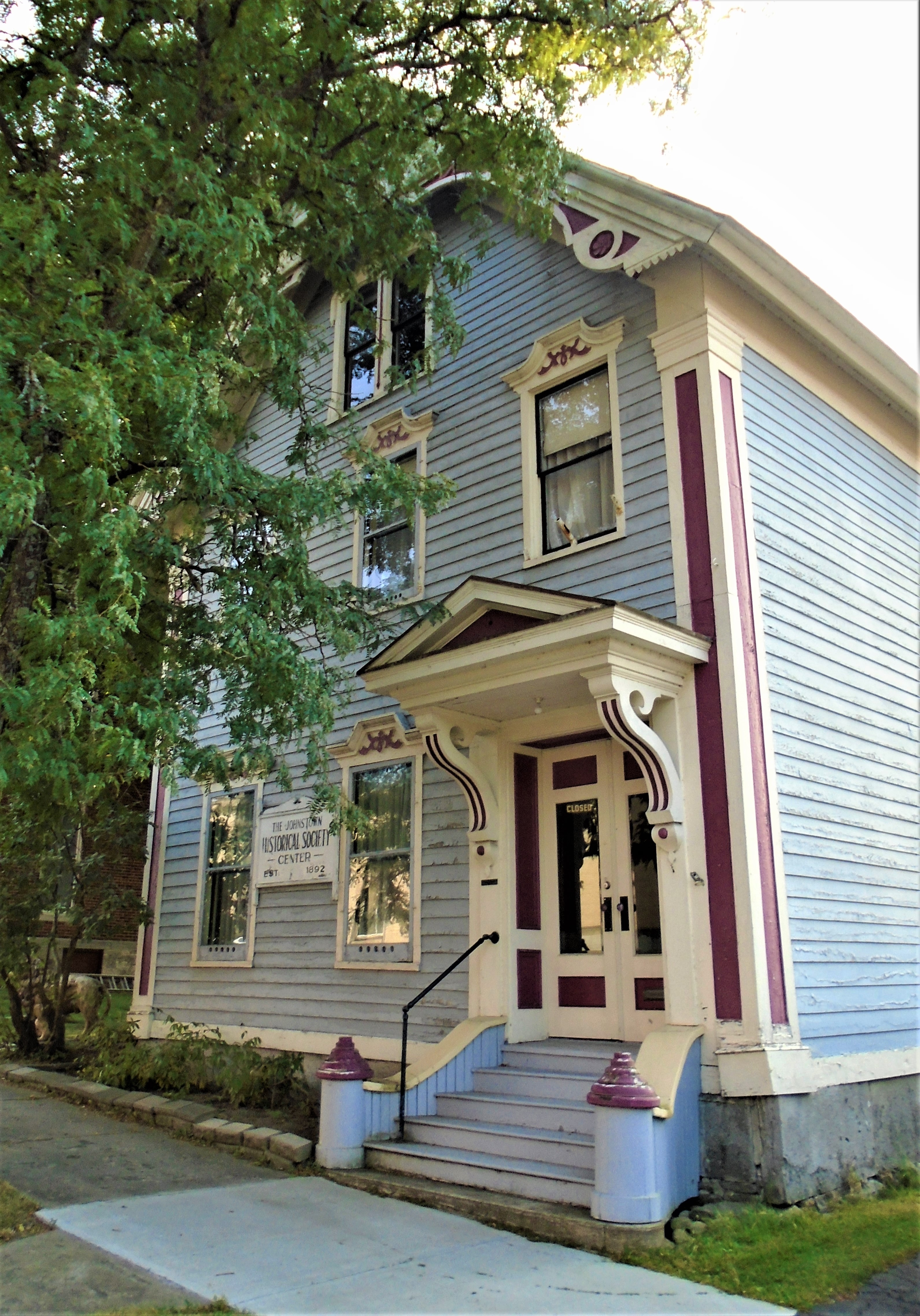
Johnstown Historical Society building in New York state (photo 2020)

- Adirondack Historical Society
- Albany County Historical Society
- Historic Albany Foundation
- Allegany County Historical Society
- Amityville Historical Society
- Arcade Historical Society
- Ardsley Historical Society
- Greater Astoria Historical Society
- Attica Historical Society
- Aurora Historical Society
- Baker's Bridge Historical Society of Alfred Station
- Bay Shore Historical Society
- Bayside Historical Society
- Bedford Historical Society
- Bellport-Brookhaven Historical Society
- Bohemia Historical Society
- Bridgehampton Historical Society
- Briarcliff Manor-Scarborough Historical Society
- The Bronx County Historical Society
- Bronxville Historical Conservancy
- Brooklyn Historical Society
- Broome County Historical Society
- Brunswick Historical Society
- Buffalo History Museum (formerly Buffalo Historical Society)
- Cairo Historical Society
- Cayuga County Historical Society
- Chautauqua County Historical Society
- Chenango County Historical Society
- Chester Historical Society
- City Island Historical Society
- Clark Mills Historical Society
- Clinton Historical Society (Clinton, New York)
- Collins Regional Historical Society
- Columbia County Historical Society
- Cortland County Historical Society
- Cow Neck Peninsula Historical Society
- Croton Historical Society
- Cuba Historical Society
- Delaware County Historical Association
- Dobbs Ferry Historical Society
- Dutchess County Historical Society
- East Hampton Historical Society
- East Islip Historical Society
- Eastchester Historical Society
- Eastville Community Historical Society in Sag Harbor
- Farmingville Historical Society
- Flushing Historical Society
- Fort Plain-Nelliston Historical Society
- Genessee County Historical Society
- Geneva Historical Society
- Greene County Historical Society
- Greenlawn-Centerport Historical Association
- Greenwich Village Historical Society
- Hamilton Historical Society
- Hastings Historical Society
- Herkimer County Historical Society
- Huntington Historical Society
- Irvington Historical Society
- Jefferson County Historical Society
- Johnstown Historical Society
- Kings County Historical Society
- Kingsbridge Historical Society
- LaGrange Historical Society
- Larchmont Historical Society
- Leroy Historical Society
- Lewis County Historical Society
- Lindenhurst Historical Society
- Livingston County Historical Society
- Lloyd Harbor Historical Society
- Lockport Historical Society
- Long Island Historical Society
- Mamaroneck Historical Society
- Mastic Peninsula Historical Society
- Millbrook Historical Society
- Minisink Valley Historical Society
- Mohawk Valley Historical Society
- Montour Historical Society
- Mount Kisco Historical Society
- Mountain Top Historical Society
- Narrow Bay Historical Society
- Nassau County Historical and Genealogical Society
- New-York Historical Society
- New York Military Affairs Symposium
- New York State Historical Association
- Historical Society of Newburgh Bay and the Highlands
- Northern New York Historical Society
- Northport Historical Society
- Pound Ridge Historical Society
- Oneida Historical Society
- Greater Oneonta Historical Society
- Onondaga Historical Association
- Ontario County Historical Society
- Oswego Historical Society
- Oysterponds Historical Society
- Parma Hilton Historical Society
- Greater Patchogue Historical Society
- Port Jefferson Historical Society
- Queens Historical Society
- Quogue Historical Society
- Rensselaer County Historical Society
- Rochester Historical Society
- Rockland County Historical and Forestry Society
- Rocky Point Historical Society
- Roslyn Landmark Society
- Sag Harbor Historical Society
- Sagtikos Manor Historical Society
- St. Lawrence County Historical Association
- Salmon River Valley Historical Society
- Sandy Ground Historical Society
- Saratoga Historical Society
- Saugerties Historical Society
- Sayville Historical Society
- Schenectady County Historical Society
- Schoharie County Historical Society
- Seneca Falls Historical Society
- Shelter Island Historical Society
- Smithtown Historical Society
- Southold Historical Society
- Springville Historical Society
- Staten Island Historical Society
- Suffolk County Historical Society
- Historical Society of the Tarrytowns
- Three Village Historical Society
- Ticonderoga Historical Society
- Tioga County Historical Society
- Union Vale Historical Society
- Wading River Historical Society
- Washington County Historical Society
- Waterloo Library and Historical Society
- Westhampton Beach Historical Society
- West Islip Historical Society
- Westchester County Historical Society
- White Plains Historical Society
- Wyoming and Middlebury Historical Society
- Yaphank Historical Society
- Yonkers Historical and Library Association
- Yorktown Historical Society

== See also ==
- Historic preservation in New York#Historical societies
- History of New York (state)
- List of museums in New York (state)
- National Register of Historic Places listings in New York
- List of historical societies in the United States
