= Dutchess County Historical Society =

Historical society located in Dutchess County, New York

Coordinates: 41.9204°N 73.9083°W

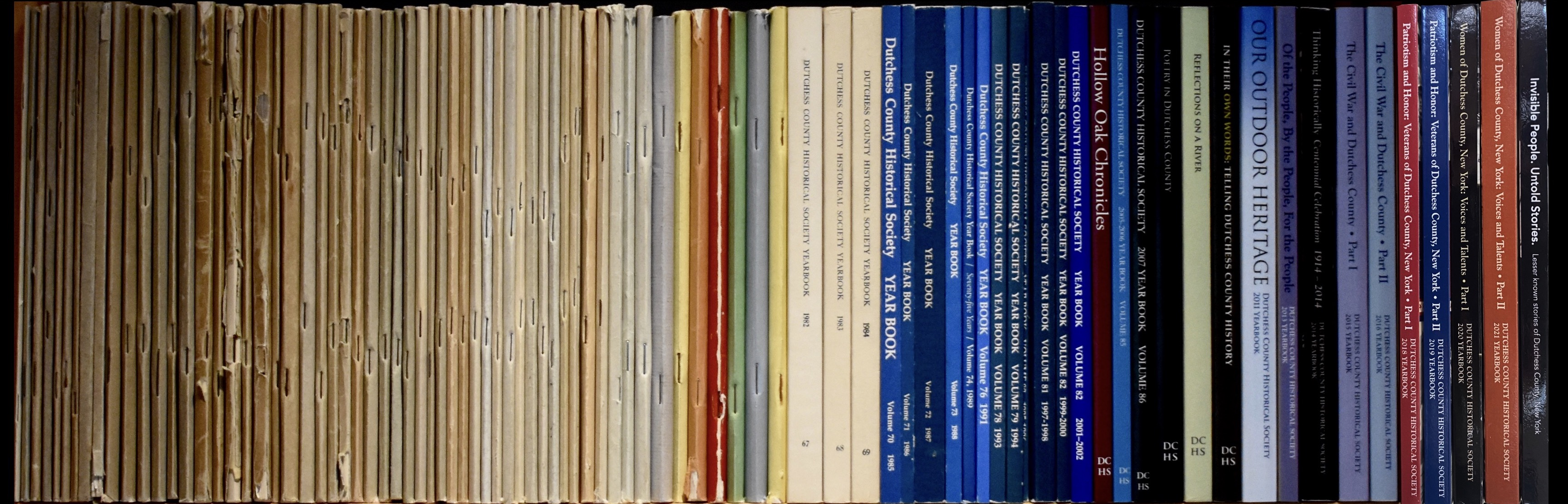
- Dutchess County Historical Society Yearbooks have been published since 1914.
- Established: 1914
- Location: 6282 Route 9, Rhinebeck, New York 12572
- Accreditation: Regents of the University of the State of New York
- Website: Official website

Dutchess County Historical Society, located in Rhinebeck, New York, was formed in Pleasant Valley, New York May 26, 1914 and received its Charter from the Regents of the University of the State of New York in 1918. (Note: There was also an organization named Dutchess County Historical Society that operated by 1845 out of Newburgh, New York and as of 1886.) Its mission is to discover, preserve and share the local area's history and artifacts from the time of its earliest people to the present.

The Society's collection of documents and objects are maintained in Rhinebeck, New York where in additions to archives, it has offices and two non-circulating libraries. It publishes an annual Yearbook, and occasionally publishes other books and pamphlets. The organization grants awards of merit and distinction each year. It conducts outreach programs that range from talks to demonstrations to workshops, and it collaborates with educational institutions and many other historic organizations and individuals in Dutchess County.

The Historical Society is funded through membership dues, the sales of its Yearbook and publications, solicitation of grants, and through philanthropic gifts and is a US tax exempt Charitable Organization.

== History ==
Among those eager to found such an organization at the time was Dutchess County resident Franklin D. Roosevelt. He laid out his vision for the Society in a letter dated December 10, 1914, mentioning a number of elements which came to fruition including an annual yearbook, occasional publications, and transcriptions of cemetery headstones. And while other notables like the President's mother Sarah Delano Roosevelt and Vincent Astor remained involved in the Society, its membership grew into the hundreds and involved a broad range of county residents. By early 1924, membership had grown to about 500.

John Mylod and Helen Wilkinson Reynolds were early organizers and active in collecting information for the society. Reynolds, a researcher and author, served as Yearbook editor from 1921 until her death in 1943. She worked with author J Wilson Poucher and photographer Margaret De M Brown on the 1924 publication of Old Gravestones of Dutchess County, New York, which catalogued 19,000 inscriptions.

== Collections ==
The Collections include archival items, photographs, postcards, textiles, diaries, will, deeds, needlework, clothing, genealogical information, and correspondence within its house museum.

Items include a portrait by Ammi Phillips of Helen Cornell Manney, whose birth family, the Cornells, were early settlers of the town of LaGrange. There is a collection of books, articles and private letters of historian and illustrator Benson Lossing, who was born in the town of Beekman, lived for some time in Poughkeepsie, and eventually built a home and library in Dover. The Hart-Hubbard Farm Records reflect two families' agricultural wholesale business across four generations from 1838 to 1967.

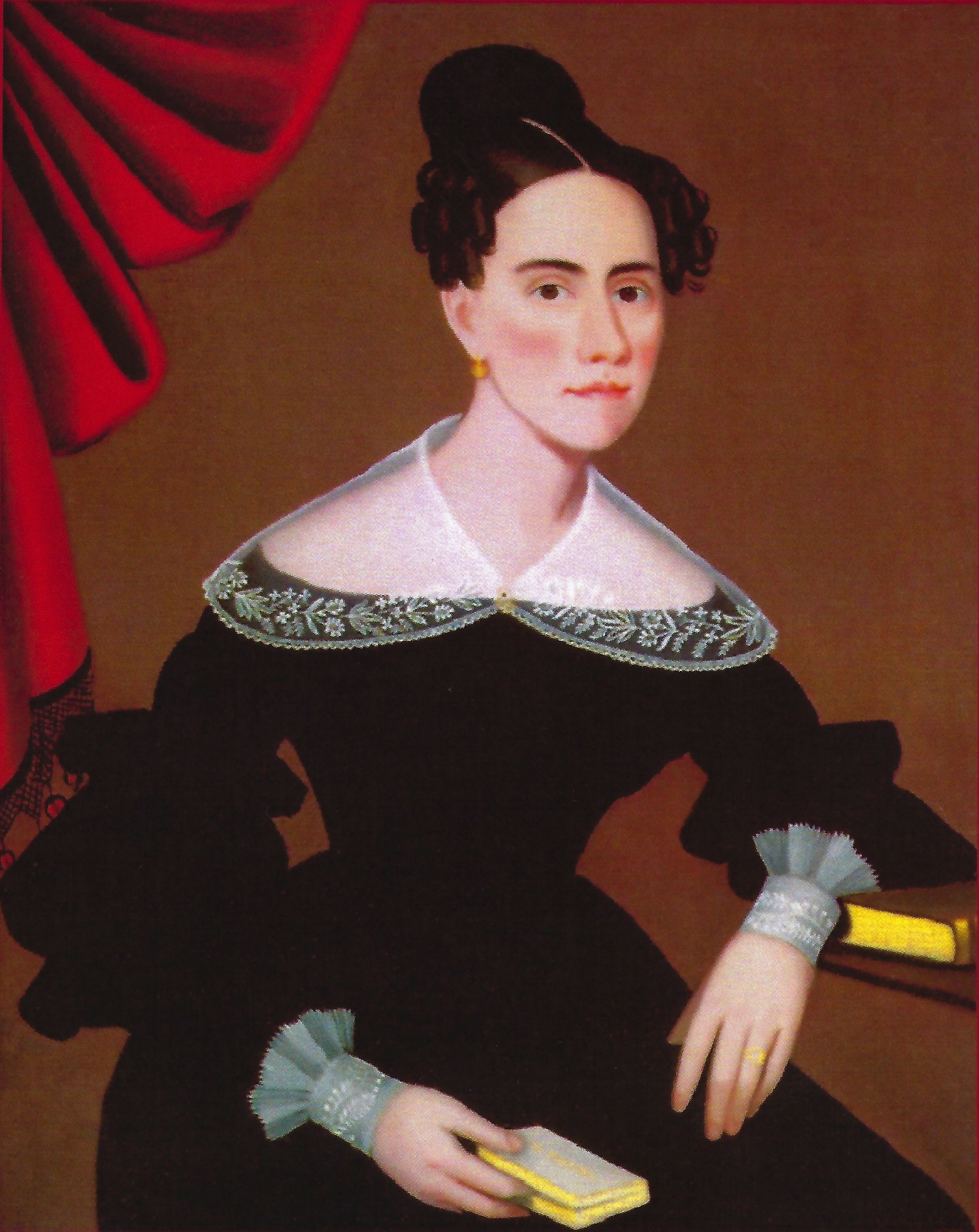
Portrait of Helen Cornell Manney by Ammi Phillips, c.1833.

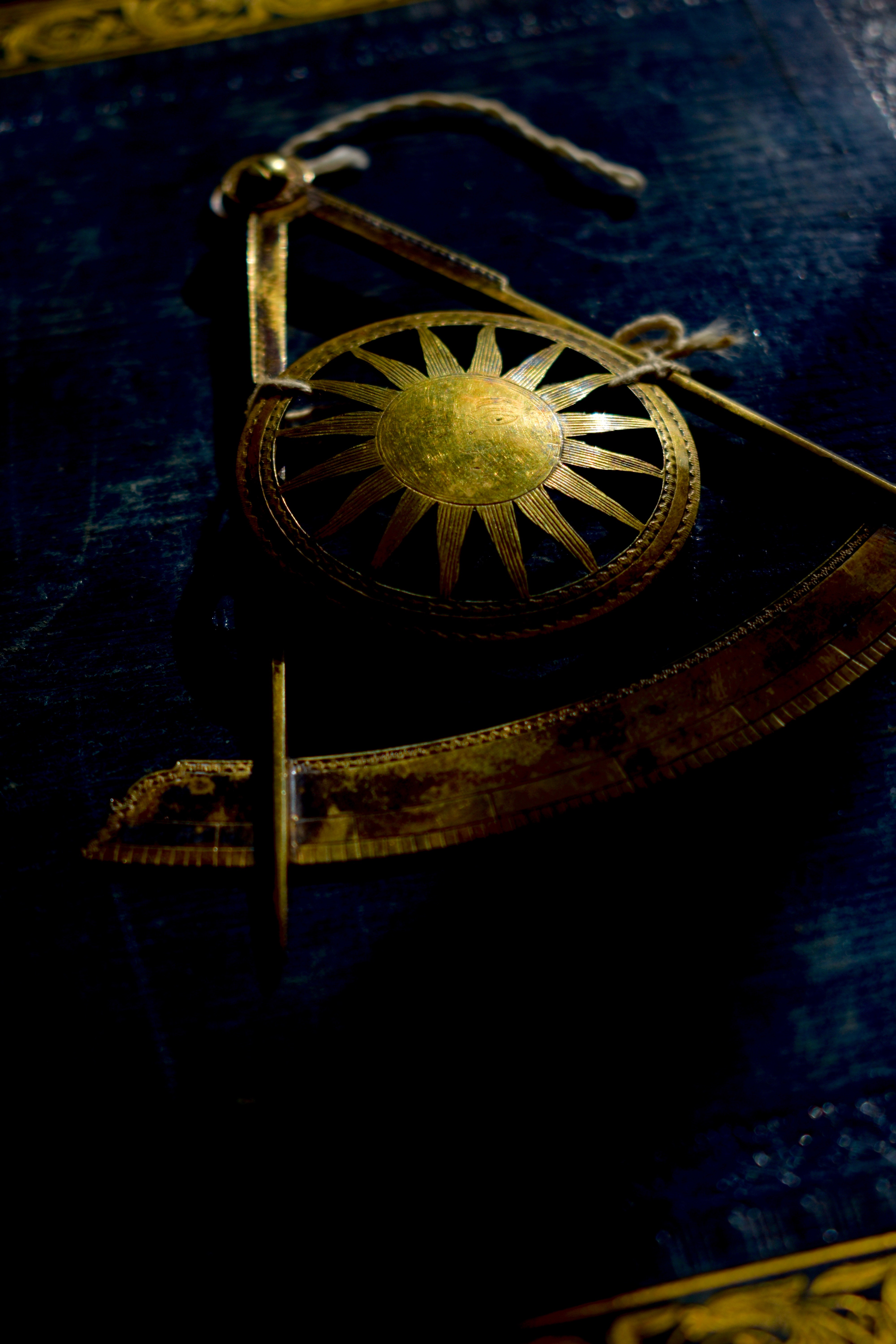
Sr. Deacon Masonic Jewel dated July 1823, Hart Hubbard Collection.

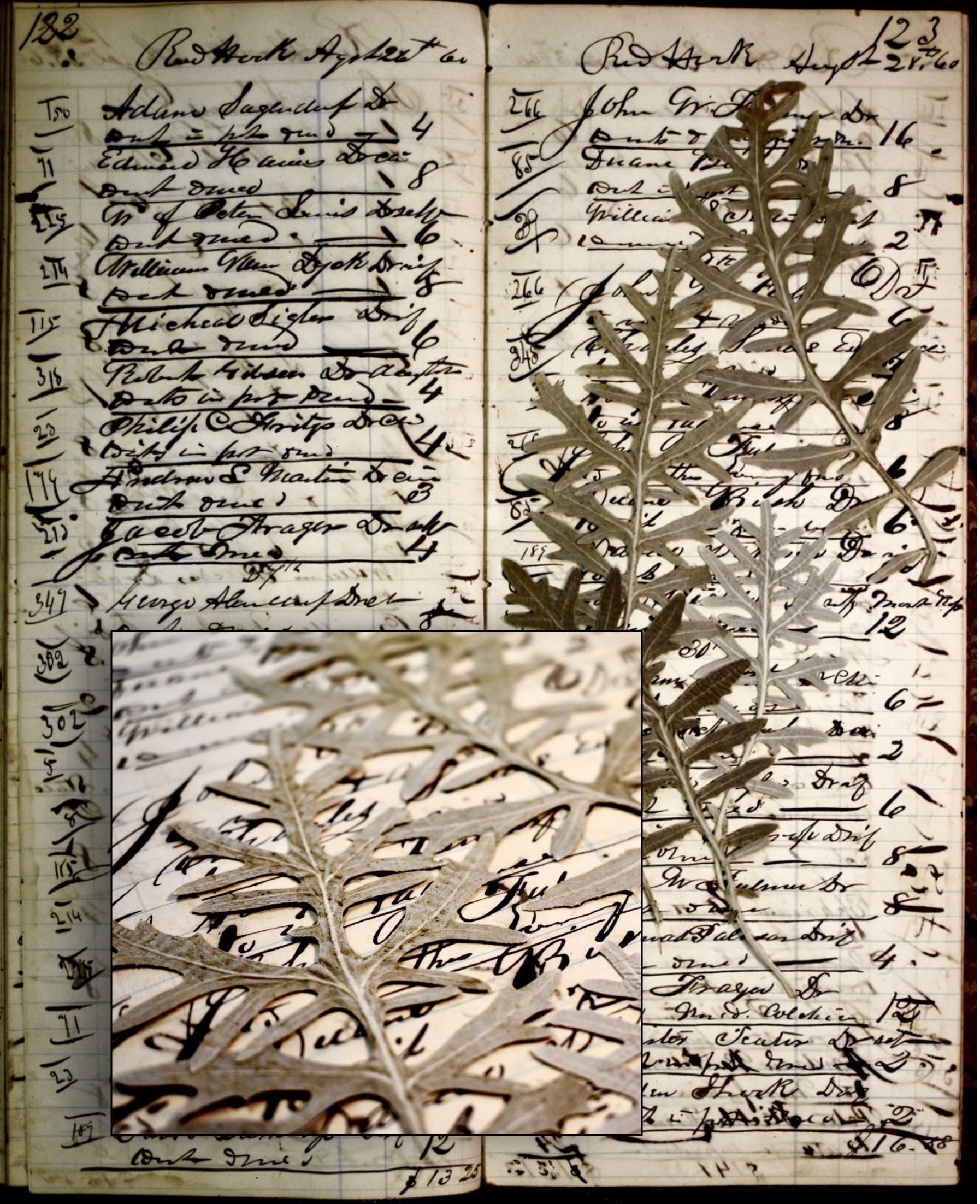
Red Hook, NY doctor's ledger with artemisia leaves used to aid digestion 1860.

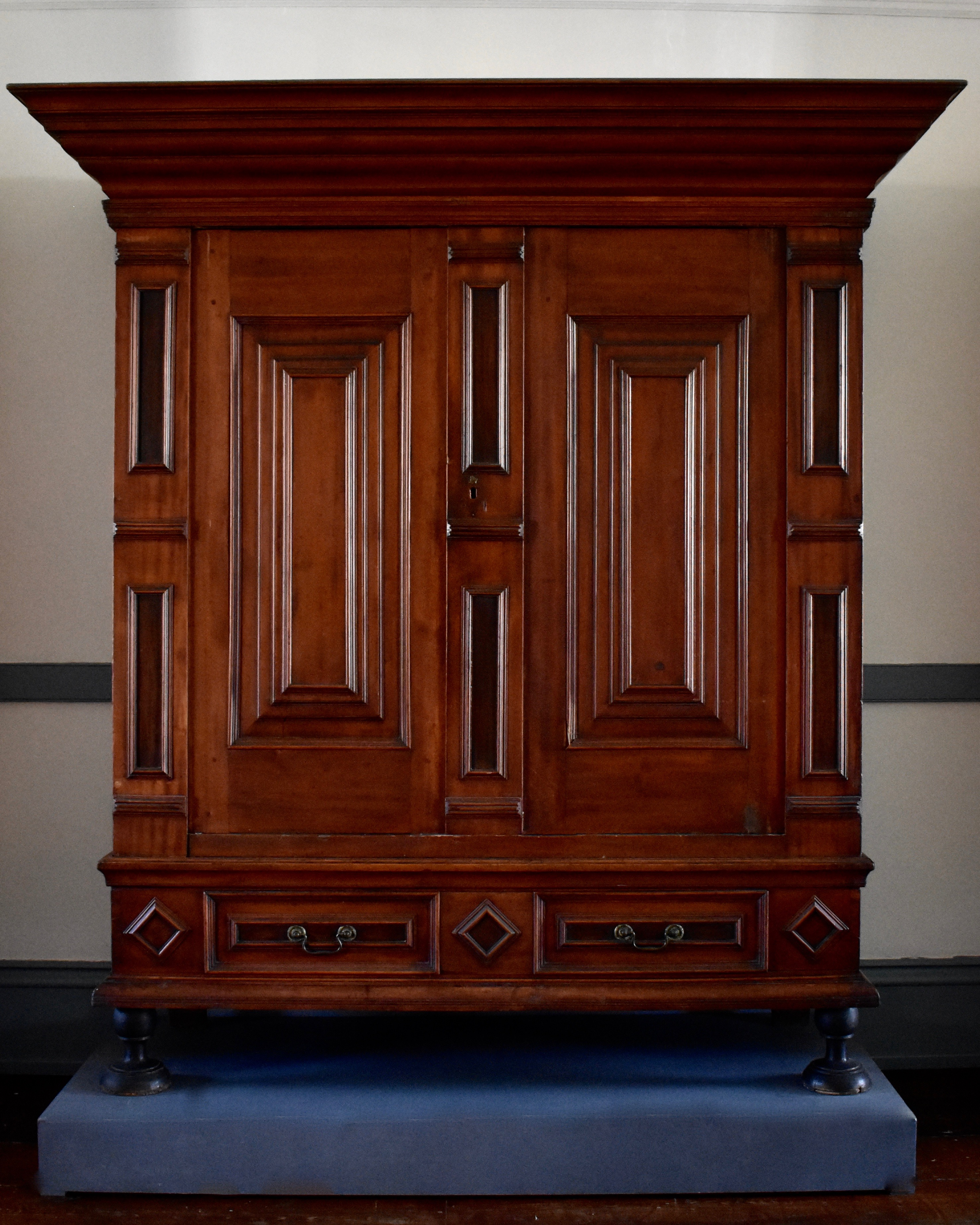
Double door Dutch "Kas" early 18th century. DAR Collection.

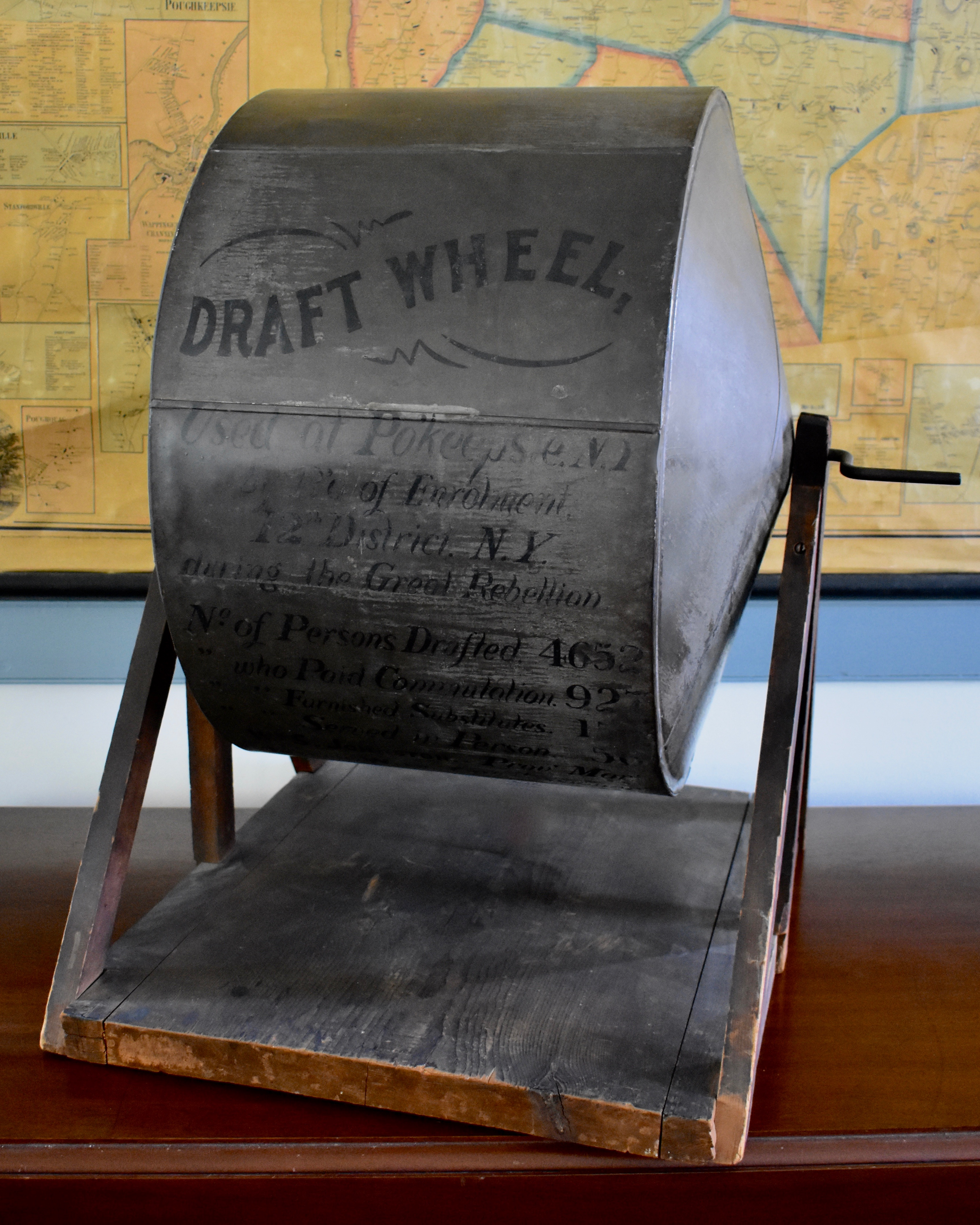
Dutchess County Civil War Draft Wheel.

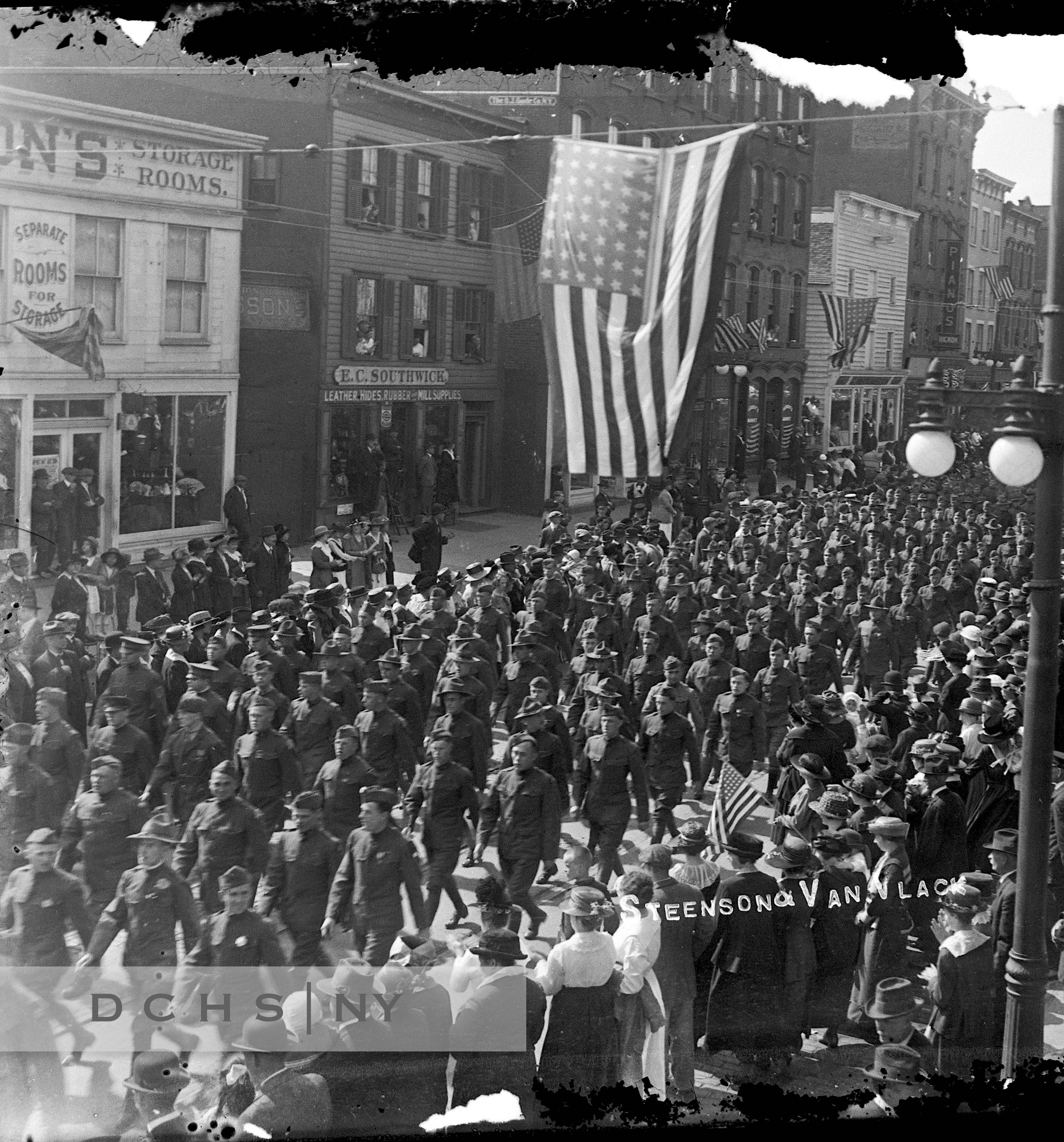
Sep 1919 Poughkeepsie parade, "Welcome Home." Fred Close Collection.

== Programs ==
The Dutchess County Historical Society has a research library and exhibits. It holds events, such as lectures, guided tours, and community outreach. They occur across Dutchess County often in partnership with the Dutchess County Historian and local historical organizations.

== Publications ==
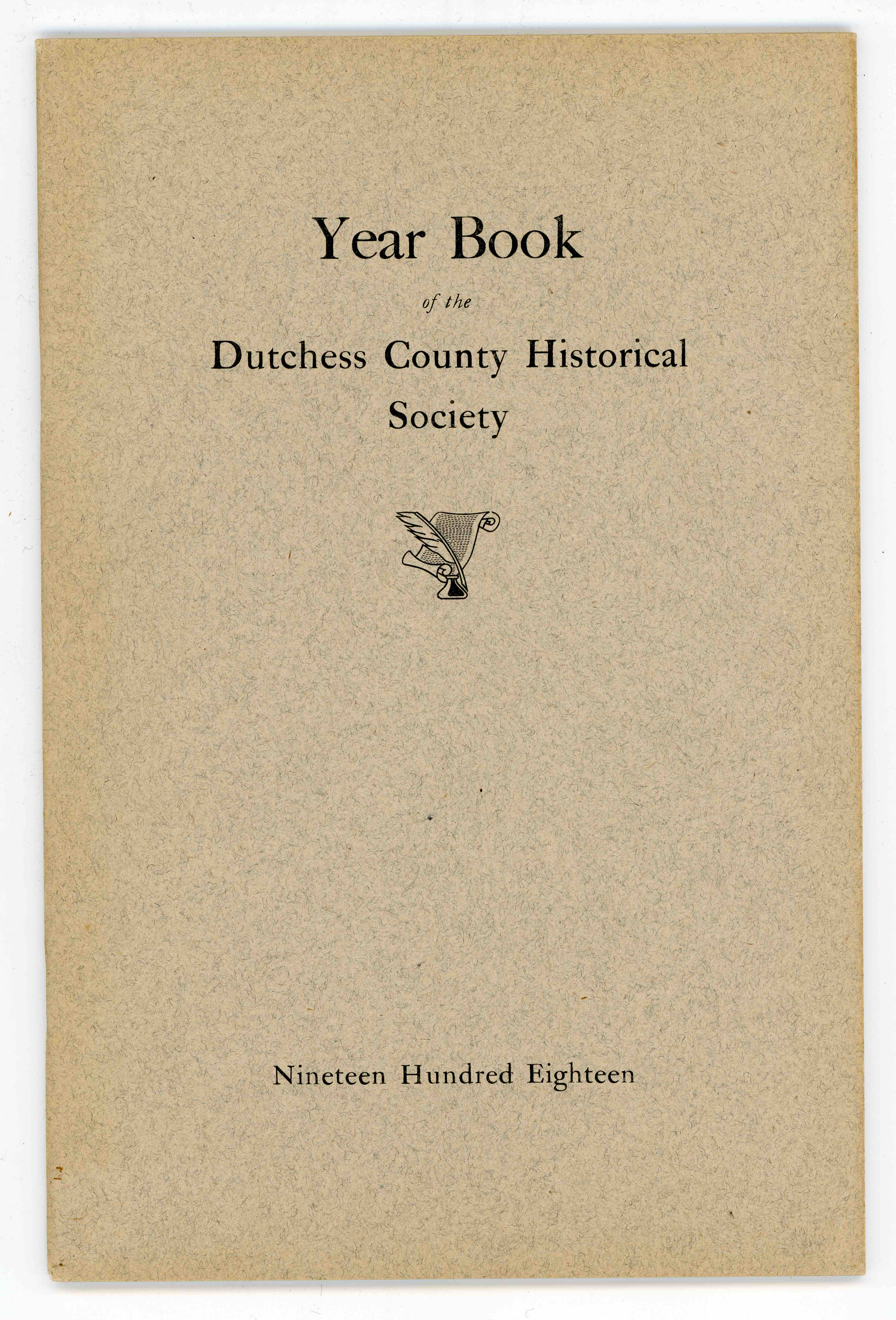
1918 Dutchess County Yearbook.

Each year it produces a yearbook and it occasionally publishes the Dutchess County Historical Society Collections and the Dutchess Historian.

The yearbook is the state's oldest continuing historical publication. The inaugural issue, dated 1914-1915, included a copy of the Hudson Valley portion of the 1779 map, an article about the Society's first meeting was held, the initial reporting of local cemeteries, an article about Brick House Farm, early divisions of the county, and a membership list.

== Awards ==
Up to four awards are given by the Historical Society each year. They are the Dutchess Award, the Helen Wilkinson Reynolds Award, the Franklin D Roosevelt Award, the Business of Historic Distinction Award.

== See also ==
- List of historical societies in New York (state)
