= Sands-Willets Homestead =

Historic house in Flower Hill, New York, United States

- U.S. National Register of Historic Places
- New York State Register of Historic Places
- Village of Flower Hill Landmark
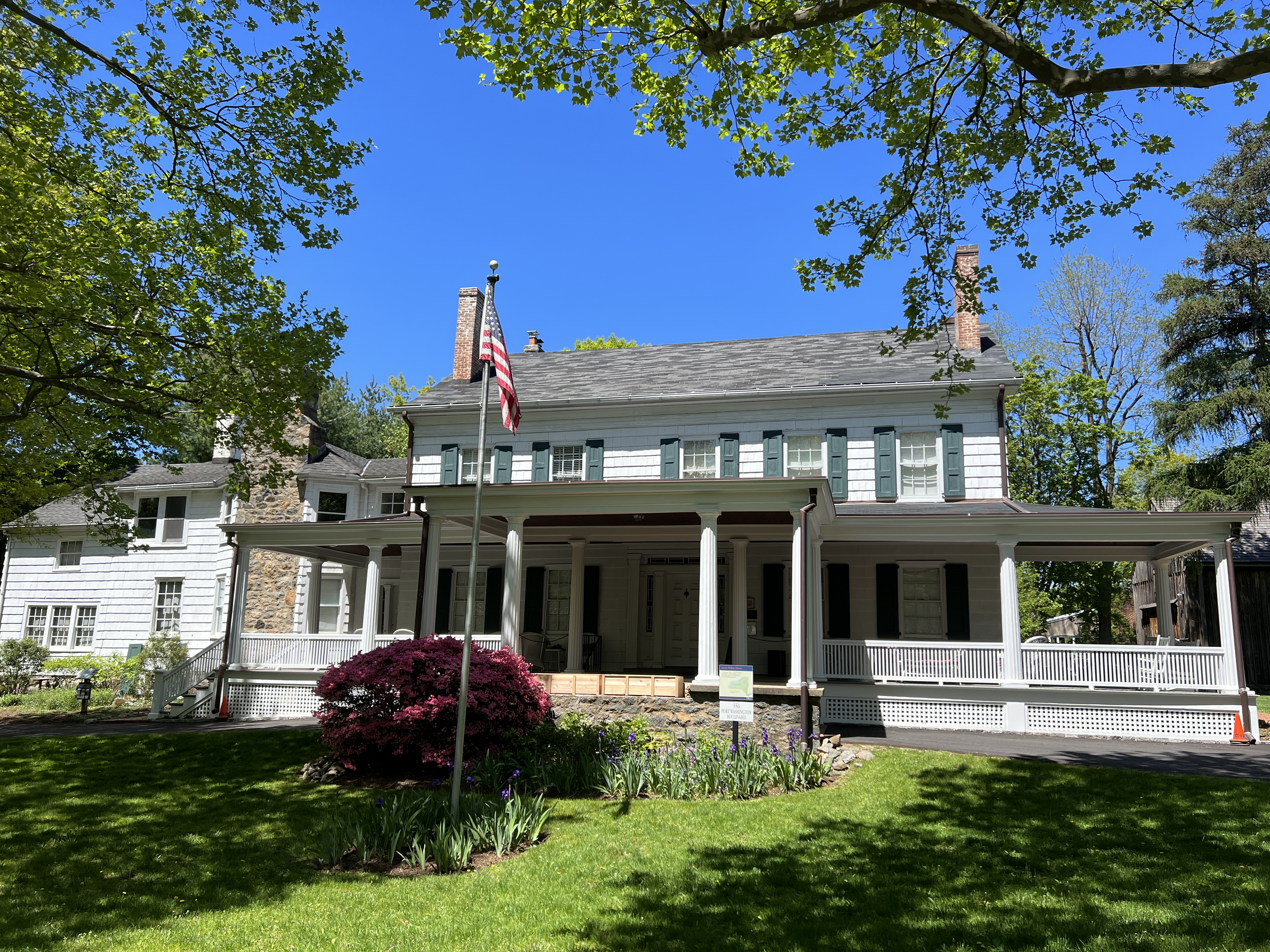
- The front of the Sands-Willets Homestead, as seen from Homewood Place in 2023.

- Location within Long Island Location within New York Location within the United States
- Location: 336 Port Washington Boulevard, Port Washington, NY 11050
- Coordinates: 40°48′56″N 73°40′51″W
- Area: Less than one acre
- Built: Ca. 1735
- Architects: Sands, John, II; Sands, John, III
- Architectural style: Greek Revival
- NRHP reference No.: 85002425

Significant dates
- Added to NRHP: September 19, 1985
- Designated NYSRHP: August 16, 1985
- Designated VFHL: November 4, 1996

The Sands-Willets Homestead is a historic house and museum located within the Incorporated Village of Flower Hill in Nassau County, on Long Island, in New York, United States.

It is operated as a historic house museum by the Cow Neck Peninsula Historical Society, is designated as a Village of Flower Hill Landmark and a New York State Landmark, in addition to being listed on the National Register of Historic Places.

== Description ==
=== Main House ===
The Sands-Willets Homestead is a 20-room, shingled 2-story building with an enlarged porch and porte cochere. The west wing dates to about 1735. It was originally a four-bay, 1 1/2-story house with end chimneys over a full-sized basement. The main portion of the house is a Greek Revival–style dwelling built during the first half of the 19th century.

When the home was built, it was the centerpiece of a 240-acre (97 ha) farm. At the time, the property stretched from Manhasset Bay at its western edge to Hempstead Harbor at its eastern edge, which was convenient for shipping produce to New York City and points beyond. Over time, sections of the farm would be sold to developers and often turned into suburban housing developments, ultimately leading to the property nowadays having an area of less than 1 acre (0.40 ha).

The Cow Neck Peninsula Historical Society purchased the home from Eliza Willets in 1976, for the purpose of preserving and restoring it, and turning it into a museum, research, and educational center.

=== Barn and garden ===
A contributing barn and a garden are also located on the property. The barn, which dates to the late 17th Century, was moved to the property in 1978.

=== 2020s renovations and accessibility upgrades ===
The Historical Society received a grant for capital improvements, in December 2020. A $125,525 grant from the Robert David Lion Gardiner Foundation enabled the Society to renovate building's porch, and make other improvements, which enabled individuals in wheelchairs, or pushing baby stollers, to share in tours. The renovations were made in ways that preserve the original heritage value of the house.

== In popular culture ==
Scenes for the HBO series Boardwalk Empire were filmed in the Sands-Willets House.

== See also ==
- The George Washington Denton House - Another historic home in the Village of Flower Hill. This home is also listed on the National Register of Historic Places.
- The Thomas Dodge Homestead - Another historic house museum that the Cow Neck Peninsula Historical Society operates, located in neighboring Port Washington.
