= Roslyn House =

- U.S. National Register of Historic Places
- Town of North Hempstead Designated Landmark
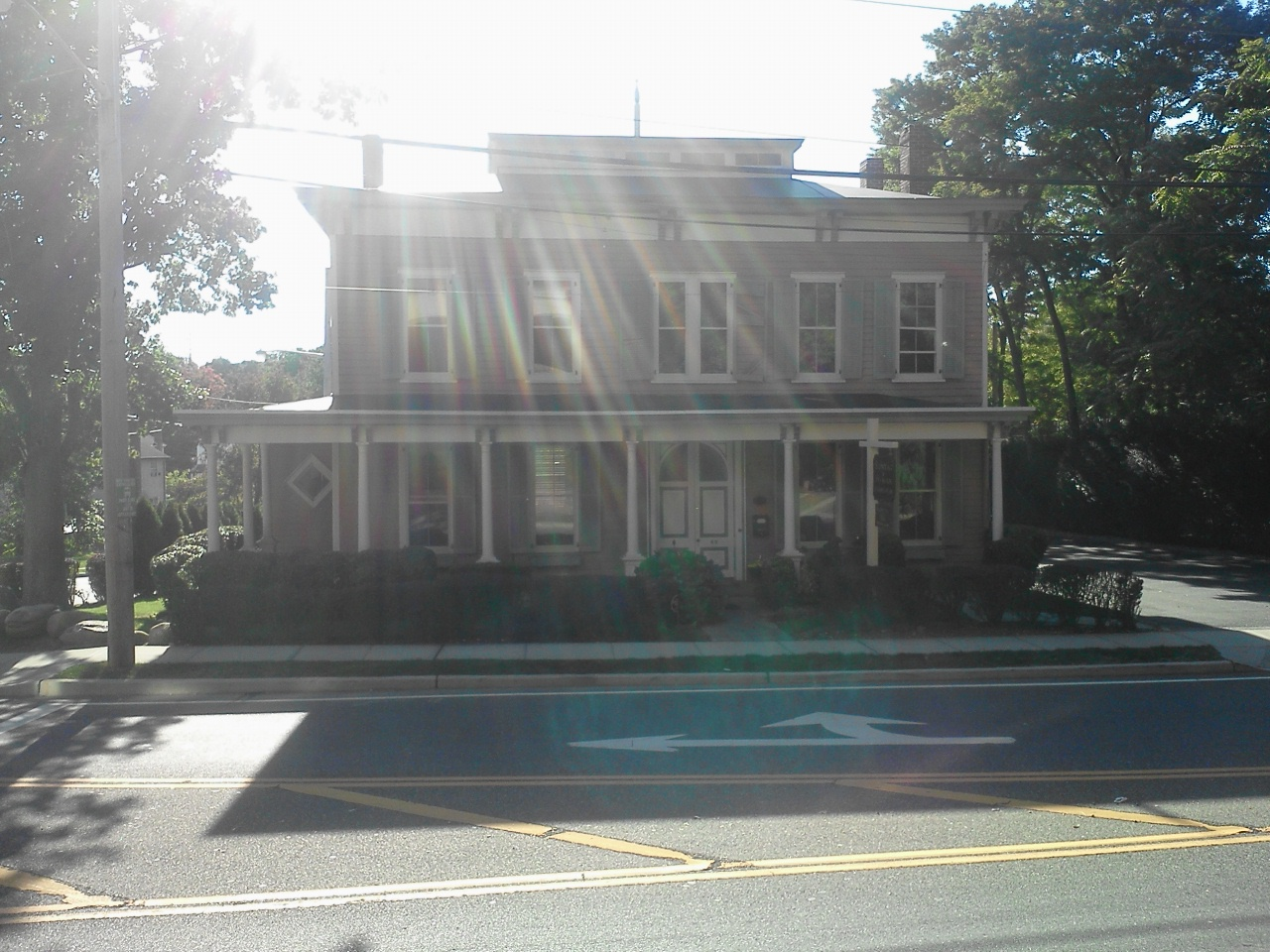
- The Roslyn House, as seen in 2013

- Location within New York Location within the United States
- Location: Jct. of Lincoln Ave. and Roslyn Rd., Roslyn Heights, New York
- Coordinates: 40°47′31″N 73°38′28″W
- Area: less than one acre
- Built: 1870
- Architectural style: Italianate
- NRHP reference No.: 90000880

Significant dates
- Added to NRHP: June 7, 1990
- Designated TNHDL: March 7, 1989

Roslyn House (also known as the Eastman House) is a historic hotel located on Roslyn Road (CR 7) in Roslyn Heights in Nassau County, New York, United States.

== Description ==
The Roslyn House is a two-story Italianate style building that was constructed around 1870. It is a rectangular, five-bay-wide frame building, clad in clapboards and set on a brick foundation. It has a hipped roof. It features a second-story porch along the front and south facades supported by Doric order columns.

== History ==
On March 7, 1989, the Roslyn House was listed as a Town of North Hempstead Designated Landmark. The following year, on June 7, 1990, it was added to the National Register of Historic Places.

== See also ==
- Eastman Cottage
- National Register of Historic Places listings in North Hempstead (town), New York
