= New York State Register of Historic Places =

Heritage register of a U.S. state

The New York State Register of Historic Places (NYSRHP) is a listing of "properties significant in history, architecture, engineering, landscape design, archeology, and culture" in the U.S. state of New York. The register was created by the New York State Historic Preservation Act of 1980 and is administered by the State Historic Preservation Officer, who is also the commissioner of the Office of Parks, Recreation and Historic Preservation.

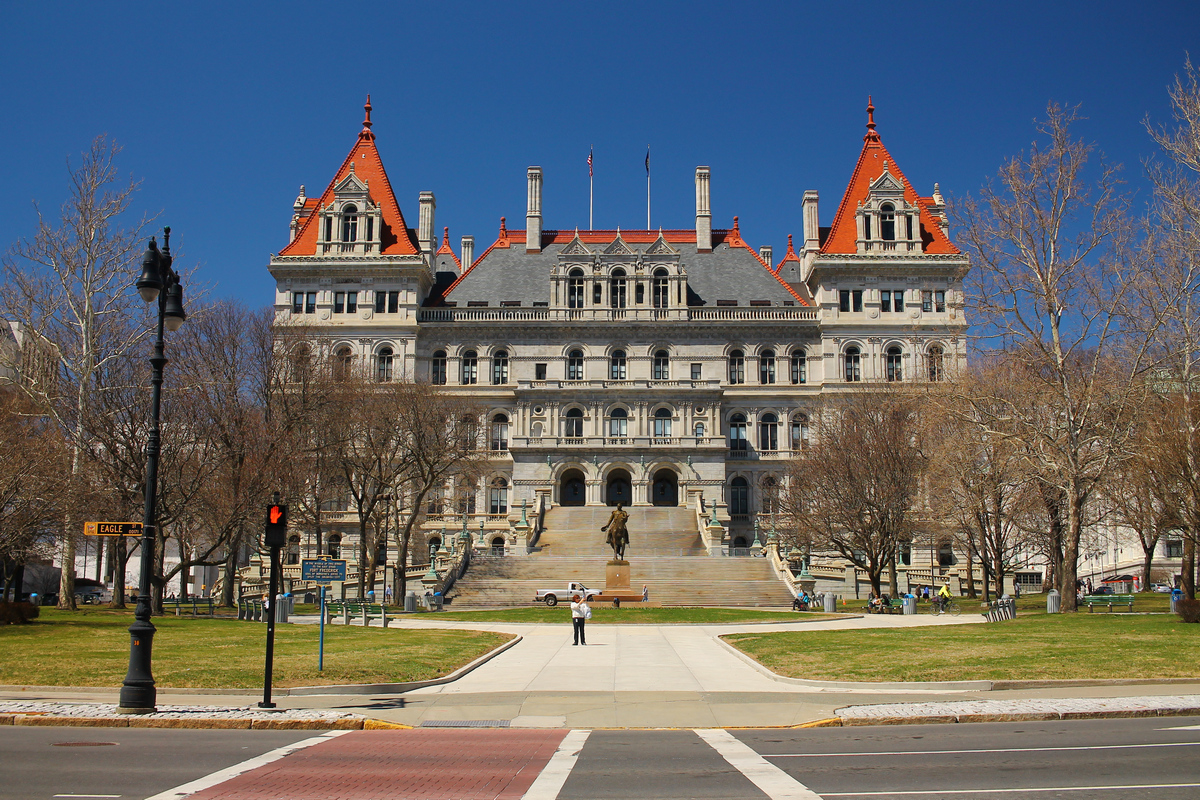
The New York State Capitol in Albany – a designated New York State Landmark

== Description ==
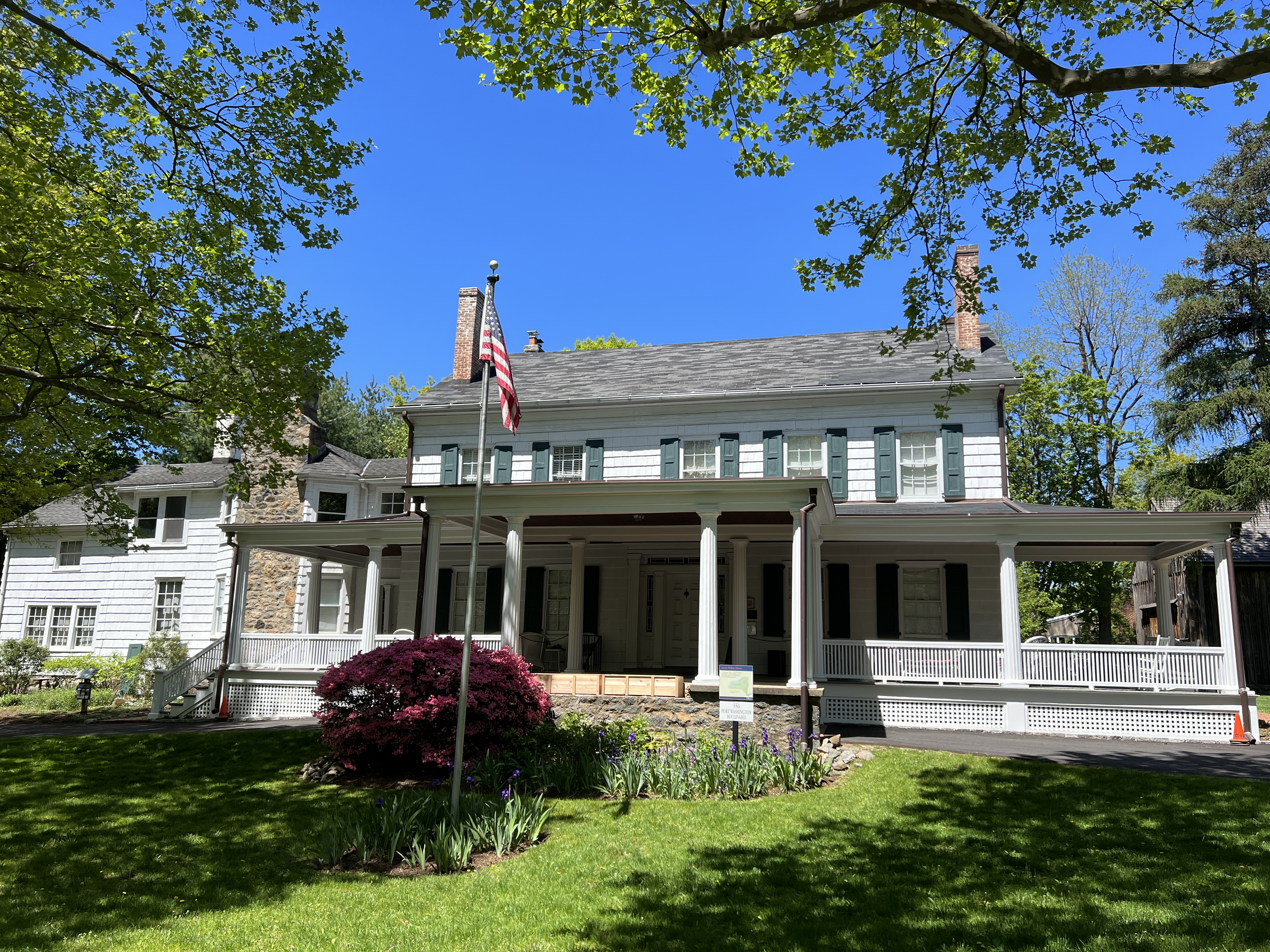
The Sands–Willets Homestead in Flower Hill – a designated New York State Landmark

In order to be listed on the state register, a property is first nominated. The nomination is then reviewed by the Survey and National Register Unit of the State Historic Preservation Office (SHPO) for compliance with the criteria set forth by the National Park Service for inclusion on the National Register of Historic Places (NRHP). If a nomination appears to meet the criteria, further investigation of the property is done. The SHPO then solicits comments from the property's owners and local officials. Next, the public is notified and a review is performed by the State Board for Historic Preservation. If the board recommends the nomination, it is sent to the State Historic Preservation Officer for review. Finally, if the officer approves, the property is entered into the register and sent to the National Park Service as a nominee for the National Register of Historic Places. This process often takes more than one year to complete.

The Cultural Resource Information System (CRIS) is a database of properties listed on the state register. Properties listed on the register may be eligible for tax credits and historic preservation grants.

== See also ==
- National Register of Historic Places listings in New York
- List of National Historic Landmarks in New York
- History of New York (state)
- List of New York (state) historic sites
- Historic preservation in New York
