= Gerry Park =

Park in Roslyn, New York, United States

- Roslyn Park
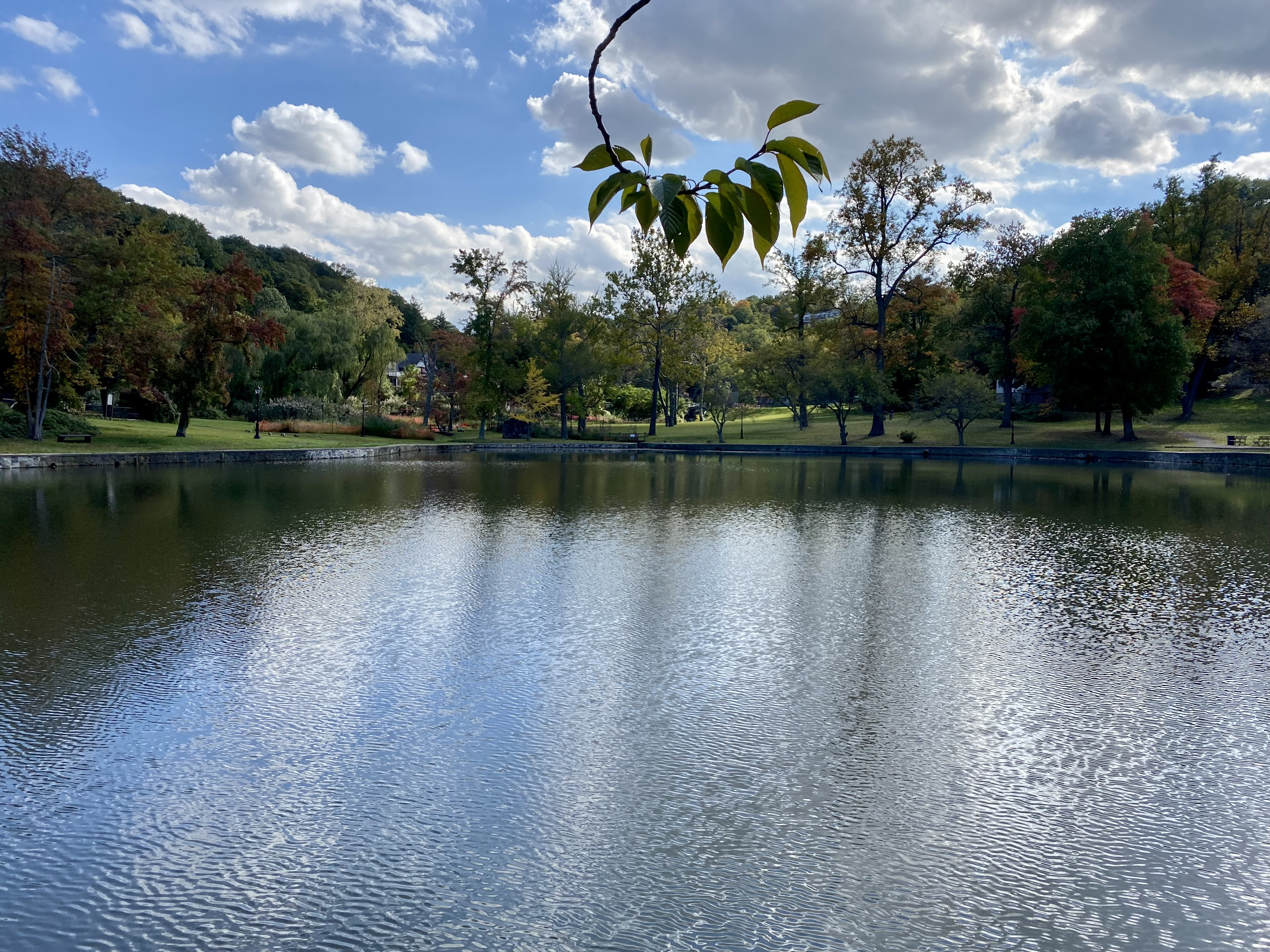
- Roslyn Pond, located within the park, in 2021
- Interactive map of Gerry Park
- Type: Town-owned; public
- Location: Roslyn, New York
- Coordinates: 40°47′50.1″N 73°38′50.8″W
- Opened: 1931
- Owner: Town of North Hempstead
- Operator: Town of North Hempstead Department of Parks and Recreation
- Status: Open
- Paths: Yes
- Parking: Yes
- Website: Gerry Pond Park
- Gerry Park
- U.S. Historic district – Contributing property
- NRHP reference No.: 05973.000261
- Added to NRHP: April 15, 1987

Gerry Park (also known as Gerry Pond Park and historically as Roslyn Park) is a major park located within the Incorporated Village of Roslyn in Nassau County, on Long Island, New York, United States.

The park is owned and operated by the Town of North Hempstead, and is listed on both the New York State Register of Historic Places and the National Register of Historic Places.

== Description ==
Gerry Park is located within a valley, in the center of the village of Roslyn. It is bordered by generally by East Broadway to its east and south, Main Street to its west, and Silver Lake and the Milldam to its north.

The park contains various monuments and memorials, a playground, a pier, a gazebo, walking paths parking, and a large pond in its center; this pond is commonly known as the Roslyn Duck Pond. The Bryant Library is located adjacent to Gerry Park, and Papermill Road traverses the park by way of the Hicks Memorial Bridge.

Gerry Park is additionally the location of a working replica of the community's original paper mill, located along Papermill Road – as well as one of the two marble horse tamer statues from the former, local Gold Coast-era estate of Clarence H. Mackay; its twin is located at nearby Roslyn High School.

== History ==
Gerry Park was first established in 1931 as Roslyn Park. It was constructed by the Town of North Hempstead over large portions of the swamplands surrounding Roslyn Pond, and was established by the town as part of a malaria control project which it executed in conjunction with local civic leaders in the Roslyn community. The park underwent an extensive renovation project in the 1980s.

On August 15, 1986, the park was listed on the New York State Register of Historic Places. Just shy of one year later – on April 15, 1987, it was additionally listed on the National Register of Historic Places, as a contributing property of the Main Street Historic District.

In 2001, Roslyn Park was renamed as Gerry Pond Park, in memory of married couple Roger and Peggy Gerry – both of whom were leading figures in the historic preservation of Roslyn and in the founding of the Roslyn Landmark Society. It underwent extensive rehabilitation throughout the 2010s.

In 2025, the Hicks Memorial Centre at the park – including the Hicks Memorial Bridge – was restored through a partnership between the Town of North Hempstead and the Roslyn Landmark Society.

== See also ==
- National Register of Historic Places listings in North Hempstead (town), New York
- The Bryant Library
- Elderfields Preserve
- Manhasset Valley Park
