= County Route C65 (Nassau County, New York) =

County highway in Nassau County, New York

- County Route C65, highlighted in red

Route information
- Maintained by NCDPW
- Length: 0.76 mi (1,220 m)

Major junctions
- South end: Main Street (CR 7A) in Roslyn
- Old Northern Boulevard (CR D71); Bryant Avenue (CR C26)
- North end: NY 25A in Roslyn

Location
- Country: United States
- State: New York
- County: Nassau

Highway system
- County routes in New York; County Routes in Nassau County

County Route C65 (CR C65) is a major, 0.76-mile (1.22 km) county highway located in the Incorporated Village of Roslyn, in Nassau County, New York, United States.

CR C65 consists of East Broadway and a portion of Old Northern Boulevard. It is owned by Nassau County and maintained by the Nassau County Department of Public Works.

== Route description ==
CR C64 begins at East Broadway's intersection with Main Street (CR 7A). It then continues towards the north to Old Northern Boulevard (CR D71)—although this segment is one-way southbound. North of this intersection, Old Northern Boulevard assumes the CR C65 designation, while the CR D71 designation ends. The road then continues north, through Roslyn's downtown, to Bryant Avenue (CR C26), at which point Old Northern Boulevard curves to the northeast and shortly thereafter merges into New York State Route 25A (NY 25A, Northern Boulevard), where the county ownership and route designation both terminate.

== History ==
The East Broadway portion of CR C65 was formerly designated as CR 7C, prior to the route numbers in Nassau County being altered—while all of Old Northern Boulevard—including the portion presently designated as part of CR C65—was formerly designated as CR 25A. Like all other county routes in Nassau County, what is now CR C65 became unsigned in the 1970s, when Nassau County officials opted to remove the signs as opposed to allocating the funds for replacing them with new ones that met the latest federal design standards and requirements, as per the federal government's Manual on Uniform Traffic Control Devices. The route numbers for the road were subsequently altered.

Additionally, all of Old Northern Boulevard was part of NY 25A until 1949, when it was bypassed with the construction and opening of the William Cullen Bryant Viaduct.

In 1988, Roslyn's then-incumbent mayor, Joel Pasnick, proposed making East Broadway a two-way street. The proposal was quickly called off after many in the community voiced concerns over the plan, citing East Broadway's narrow width and related safety concerns.

=== Landmarks ===
Several landmarks, including many listed on the National Register of Historic Places, are located along CR C65 – such as the Roslyn National Bank and Trust Company Building, the Smith–Valentine–Wood House, the Willet Titus House, and the old Rescue Hook & Ladder Company No. 1 Firehouse.

== Major intersections ==
The entire route is in Roslyn, Nassau County.

mi	km	Destinations	Notes
0.00	0.00	Main Street (CR 7A)	Southern terminus; one-way southbound; no access from CR 7A
0.47	0.76	Old Northern Boulevard (CR D71)	Road name changes from East Broadway to Old Northern Boulevard at this location, and two-way traffic begins; eastern terminus of CR D71
0.59	0.95	Bryant Avenue (CR 26)	Access to and from westbound NY 25A, via Bryant Avenue and Wittes Lane
0.76	1.22	NY 25A (Northern Boulevard) – New York, Calverton	Eastern terminus; access only to and from eastbound NY 25A
1.000 mi = 1.609 km; 1.000 km = 0.621 mi: Incomplete access; Route transition

== See also ==
- List of county routes in Nassau County, New York
