= Hicks Lumber Company Store =

Historic commercial building in New York, United States

- U.S. National Register of Historic Places
- New York State Register of Historic Places
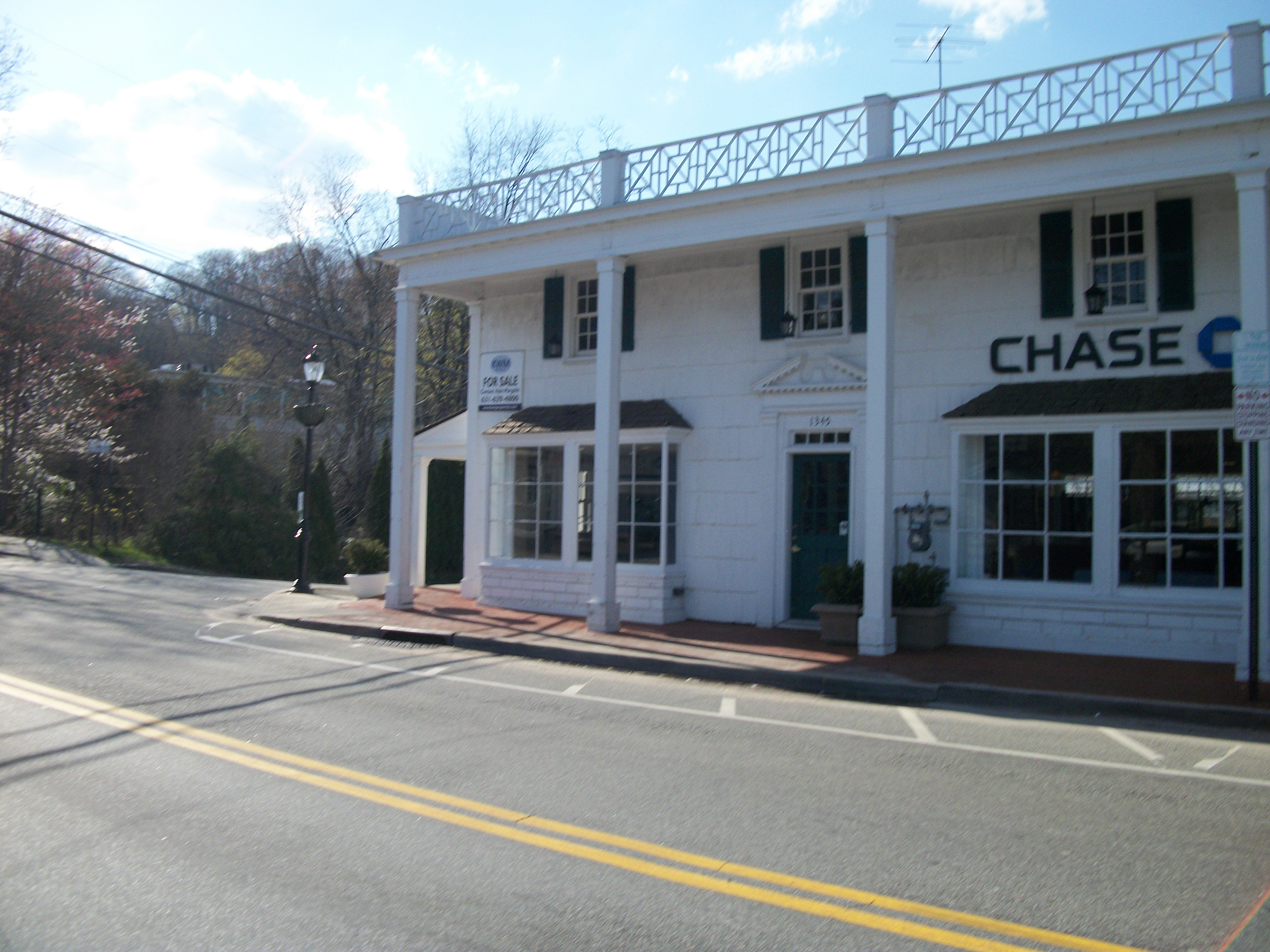
- The former Hicks Lumber Company Store, from across Old Northern Boulevard

- Location within New York Location within the United States
- Location: 1345 Old Northern Blvd., Roslyn, New York
- Coordinates: 40°48′1″N 73°39′1″W
- Area: less than one acre
- Built: 1920
- Architect: Thompson, George R.
- Architectural style: Colonial Revival
- MPS: Roslyn Village MRA
- NRHP reference No.: 86002636

Significant dates
- Added to NRHP: October 2, 1986
- Designated NYSRHP: August 15, 1986

The Hicks Lumber Company Store is a historic commercial building located within the Incorporated Village of Roslyn, in Nassau County, New York, United States.

== Description ==
The building is a two-story, frame building with Colonial Revival style detailing. It has a low-pitched hipped roof and projecting, two-story portico. The first story features original, projecting display windows.

== History ==
The building was built in 1920, housing the Hicks Lumber Company Store. It would later become a bank.

It was added to the New York State Register of Historic Places on August 15,1986. It was subsequently further listed on the National Register of Historic Places on October 2, 1986, and is also located next door to the Roslyn Grist Mill, which was also added the National Register of Historic Places on the same day.

== See also ==
- Roslyn Village Historic District
- Willet Titus House
