= The Bryant Library =

- The Bryant Library; Roslyn War Memorial Building
- U.S. Historic district – Contributing property
- New York State Register of Historic Places
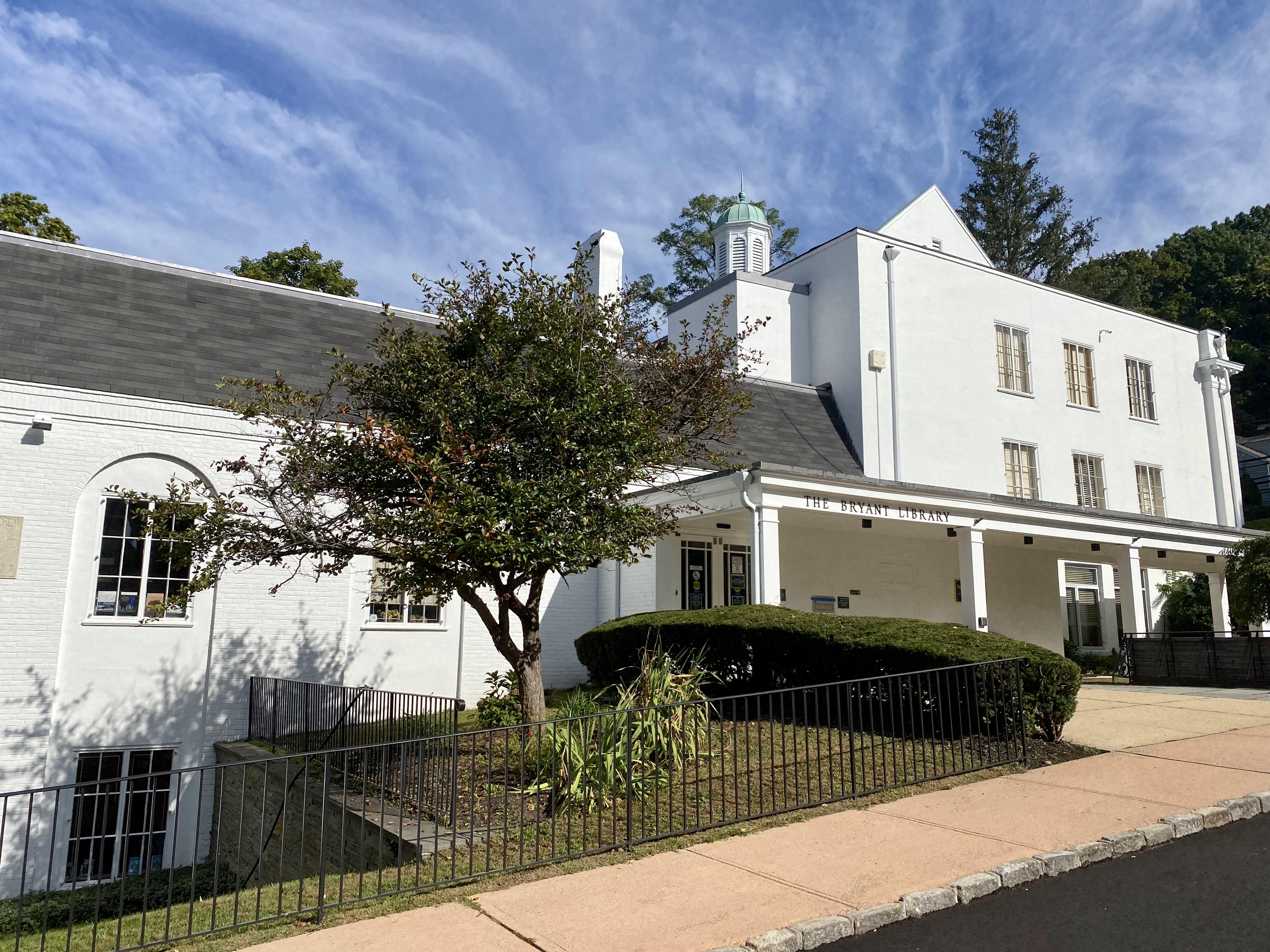
- The main entrance to the library in 2021

- Location within New York Location within the United States
- Interactive map
- Location: 2 Papermill Road, Roslyn, New York
- Coordinates: 40°47′52.9″N 73°38′48.3″W
- Built: 1921
- Architect: Frederick Marquand Godwin
- Part of: Roslyn Village Historic District (ID90NR01742)
- Designated CP: April 15, 1987

The Bryant Library (also known as the Bryant Public Library and the Bryant Library of Roslyn and historically known as the Roslyn War Memorial Building) is a historic building, community center, and public library located within the Village of Roslyn, on Long Island, New York, United States.

It is listed on the National Register of Historic Places and is the oldest public library in Nassau County, having been established in 1878.

== Description ==
The Roslyn War Memorial Building was built in 1921, the wake of World War I, and on October 9 of that year. Designed by Frederick Marquand Godwin – writer William Cullen Bryant's great-grandson – and built by the Roslyn-based Whitney Co., Inc., it was built as a community center and as war memorial for the nine Roslyn residents who died in the war. Shortly after its erection, it received an award for the best small-town war memorial. The James L. Lyons Post of the American Legion would move its headquarters within the building when it opened.

In 1874, writer William Cullen Bryant, who resided at nearby Cedarmere in modern-day Roslyn Harbor and felt the community was in need of a social space where the public could read, erected Bryant Hall. Located on present-day Bryant Avenue, Bryant Hall would be sold for $1 by Bryant's daughter, Julia, to the Bryant Circulating Library Association (formed one year prior, in 1878), per her late father's wish. The building would serve as its home until 1946, when Bryant Hall was demolished through eminent domain for the construction of the William Cullen Bryant Viaduct; the library would operate at temporary locations between 1946 and 1952. The Roslyn War Memorial Building became the new, permanent home for the library in 1952, and an expansion off its rear was constructed in the late 1960s.

The building was listed on the New York State Register of Historic Places in 1986. One year later, in 1987, it was listed on the National Register of Historic Places as a contributing property to the Roslyn Village Historic District.

== Service area ==
The Bryant Library's district boundaries are roughly coterminous with those of the Roslyn Union Free School District. Accordingly, it serves all of Roslyn and Roslyn Estates – along with portions of East Hills, Flower Hill, Greenvale, Old Westbury, Roslyn Harbor, and Roslyn Heights, and portions of an industrial park in unincorporated Port Washington.

== See also ==
- National Register of Historic Places listings in North Hempstead (town), New York
- Public libraries in North America
- Roslyn Village Historic District
- World War I memorials
