= Roslyn Savings Bank Building =

Historic commercial building in Roslyn, New York, United States

- U.S. National Register of Historic Places
- New York State Register of Historic Places
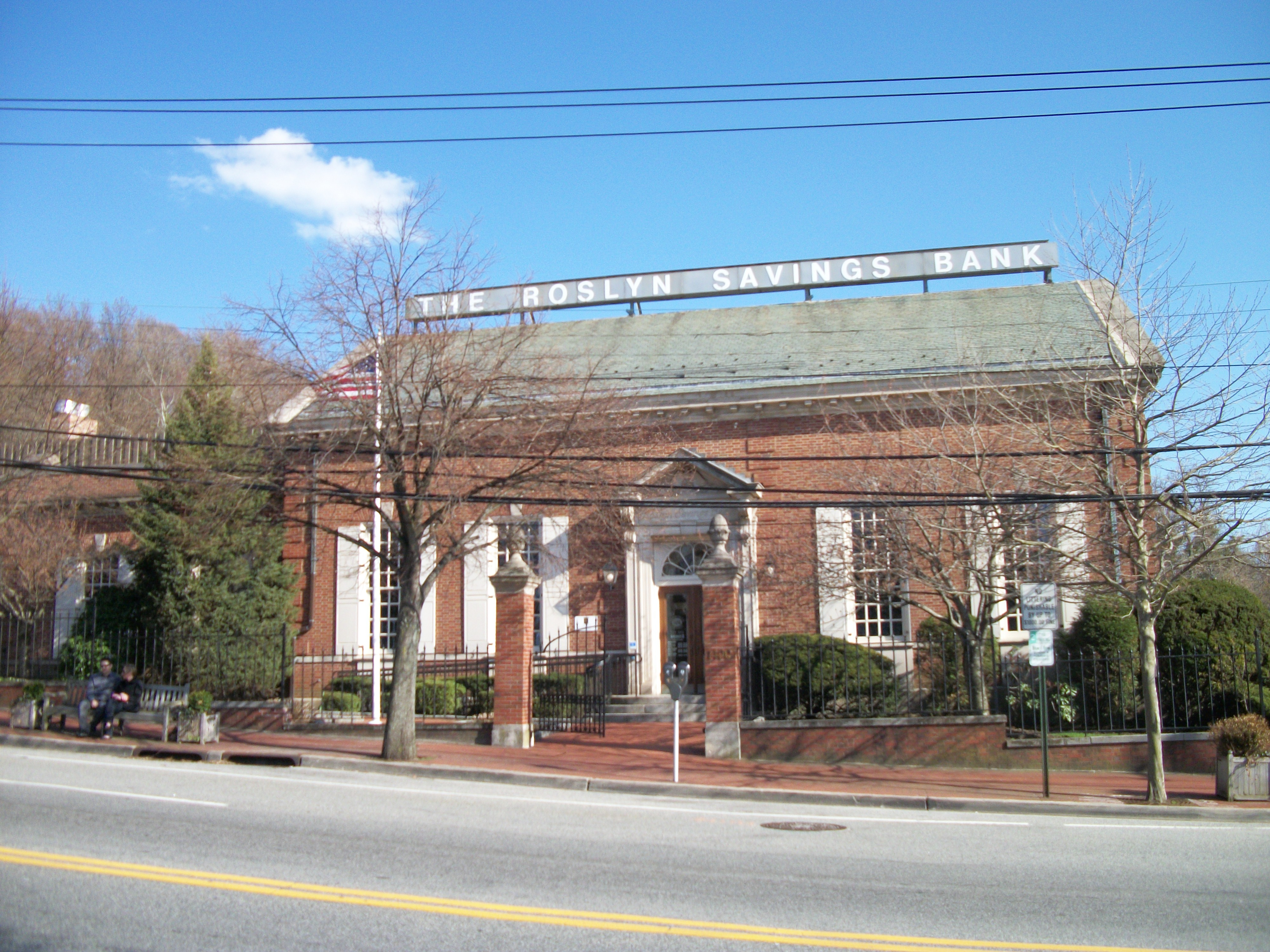
- The Roslyn Savings Bank Building, seen in 2011

- Location within Long Island Location within New York Location within the United States
- Location: 1400 Old Northern Blvd., Roslyn, New York
- Coordinates: 40°48′3″N 73°38′52″W
- Area: 1 acre (0.40 ha)
- Built: 1932
- Architect: Shaknis, Alfred C.
- Architectural style: Colonial Revival, Georgian Revival
- MPS: Roslyn Village MRA
- NRHP reference No.: 86002640

Significant dates
- Added to NRHP: October 2, 1986
- Designated NYSRHP: August 15, 1986

The Roslyn Savings Bank Building is a landmarked, historic commercial building located on Old Northern Boulevard within the Incorporated Village of Roslyn in the Town of North Hempstead, in Nassau County, on Long Island, New York, United States.

The building is currently occupied by a branch of Flagstar Bank – of which the Roslyn Savings Bank became part.

== Description ==
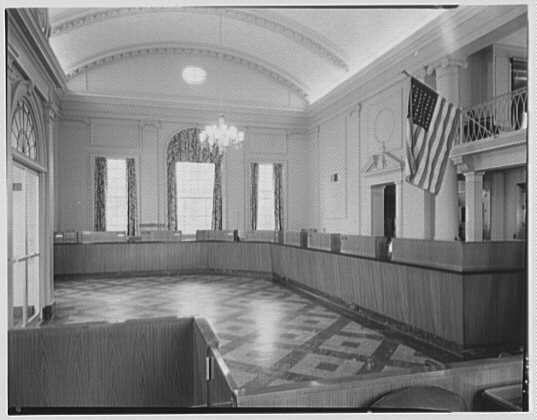
The interior of the original part of the building in 1955

The building was originally built for the Roslyn Savings Bank (now part of Flagstar Bank) on the site of its older bank building in 1932. It was designed by architect Alfred C. Shaknis and replaced the previous, 1906 bank building; the previous bank building housed both the Roslyn Savings Bank and the Bank of Hempstead Harbor – the latter of which would eventually be renamed the Roslyn National Bank and Trust Company and move to its own standalone location slightly to the north along Old Northern Boulevard in 1931.

Additions to the building were built in 1963 and 1980. The building's additions occupy the former site of the Roslyn Hotel.

The original portion of the structure consists of a one-story banking hall with a gable roof, with a two-story flat roofed office block in a Georgian Revival style. The original front facade is five bays wide with a center entrance and features an elaborate, pedimented stone surround.

The building was added to both the New York State Register of Historic Places and the National Register of Historic Places in 1986.

== See also ==
- Roslyn National Bank and Trust Company Building
- Roslyn Village Historic District
