= Main Street Historic District (Roslyn, New York) =

Historic district in New York, United States

- U.S. National Register of Historic Places
- U.S. Historic district
- New York State Register of Historic Places
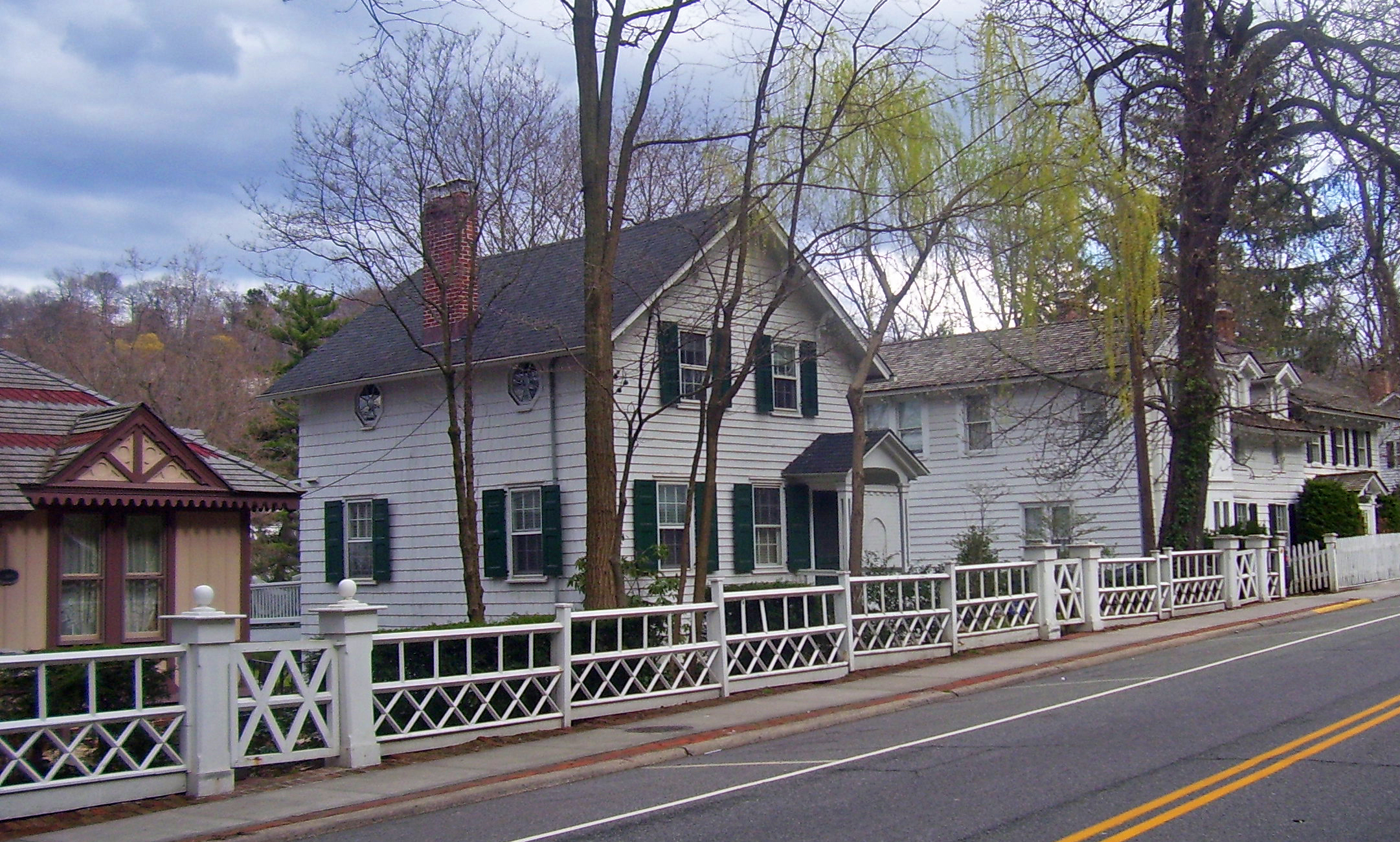
- Houses on Main Street, 2008

- Location within New York Location within the United States
- Location: Roslyn, NY
- Nearest city: Glen Cove
- Coordinates: 40°47′50″N 73°38′55″W
- Area: 40 acres (16 ha)
- Built: 19th century
- Architect: Thomas Wood, James K. Davis
- Architectural style: Federal, Greek Revival
- NRHP reference No.: 74001266
- Added to NRHP: 1974

The Main Street Historic District is one of two such districts in the village of Roslyn, New York. It is, as its name suggests, located along Main Street between North Hempstead Turnpike (NY 25A) and East Broadway, incorporating Tower Street and portions of Glen Avenue and Paper Mill Road.

== Overview ==
It is mostly residential, with some commercial development at its northern end. The 50 buildings within it are mostly houses, many built during the 19th century before the Civil War, in the Federal and Greek Revival styles. Main Street has changed very little despite the heavy growth of surrounding areas of Nassau County. The district was created in the early 1970s and added to the National Register of Historic Places in 1974. It is also listed on the New York State Register of Historic Places.

== Geography ==
The Main Street area is bounded on the east by the waters of Roslyn Pond and on the west by steep upward slopes. There are no through cross streets, save Old Northern Boulevard, intersecting Main between North Hempstead and East Broadway. This geographic separation has been credited with helping the district retain its historic character.

In the early 20th century, Gerry Park was created out of some of the Roslyn Pond land as part of a malaria control project. It contains a replica of Roslyn's original paper mill, and is included within the district.

== History ==
What has since become Roslyn was first settled in the mid-17th century as Hempstead Harbor, a port community serving Hempstead and other communities to the south. The Main Street area was where this settlement took place. The oldest property in the district, a section of the Van Nostrand-Starkins House, dates to 1680, during this period.

In 1700 the village's first gristmill was built. Hendrick Onderdonk took it over in the 1750s, and was able to open up a paper mill in 1773, the first real industry in the village. Around that time the first extant house along Main Street, now numbered 150 Main Street, was built as well, by Wilson Williams, a cooper who worked for Onderdonk. George Washington stayed there in 1790, and his diary mentions the two mills.

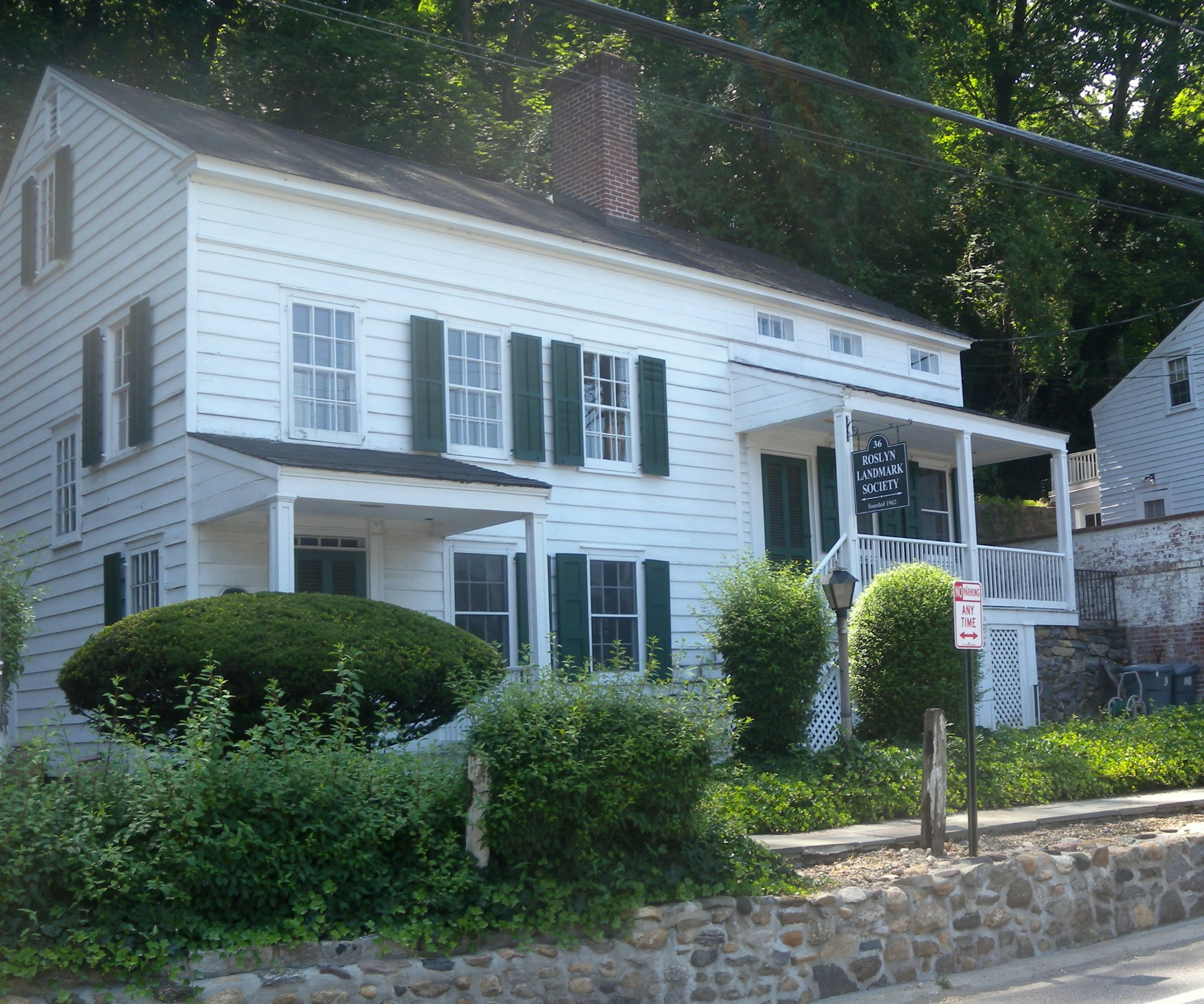
The Roslyn Landmark Society's office.

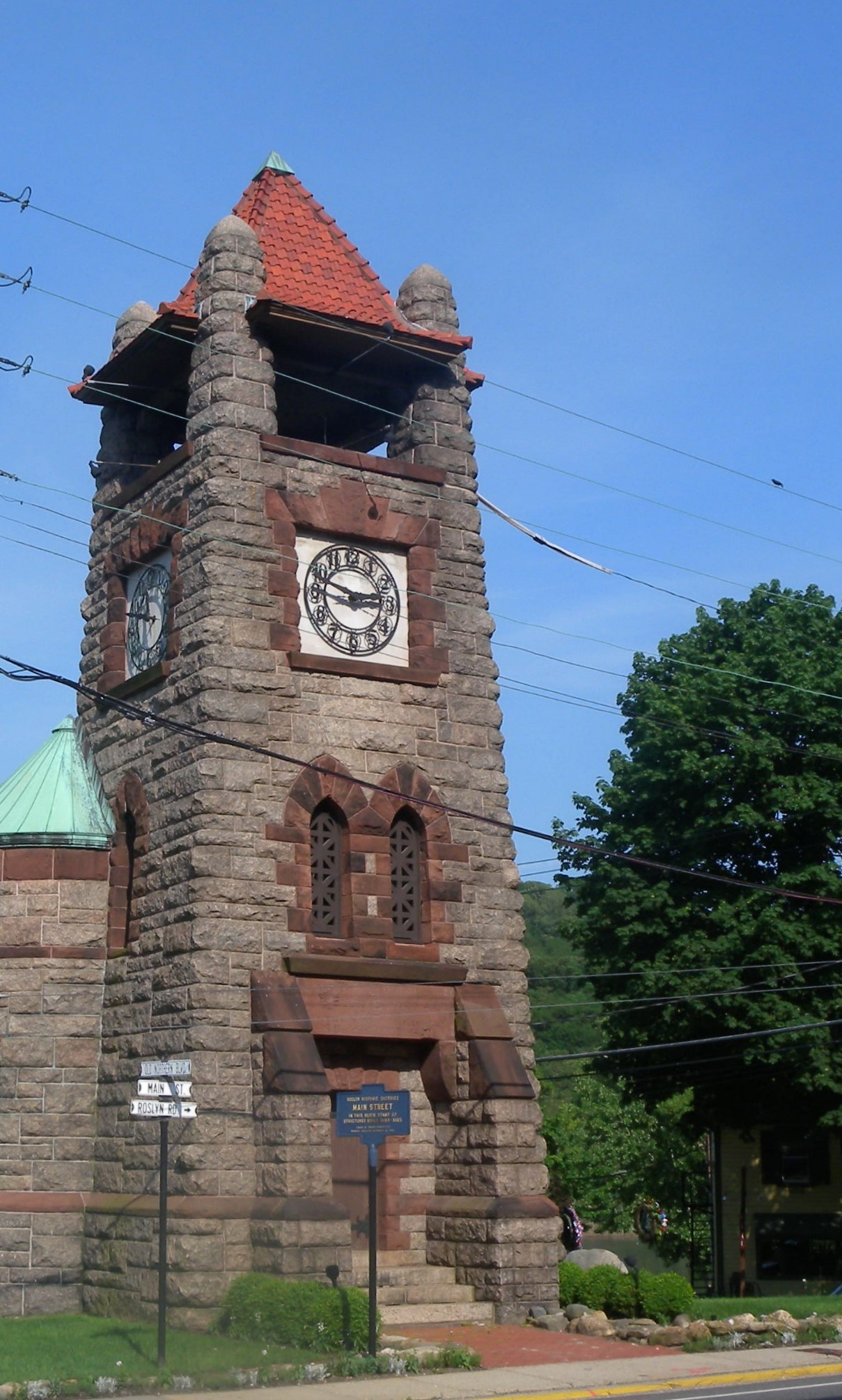
The Ellen E. Ward Memorial Clock Tower.

The 19th century saw the houses along Main Street quadruple in number. Most of them were built by local builders or merchants, with only one, John Hendrickson's home at 110 Main, intended as an estate of the kind found elsewhere along Long Island's North Shore. The stone clock tower which serves as Roslyn's most identifiable landmark was erected at the junction of Main and Old Northern in 1895.

Land use remained in the primarily residential pattern throughout the 20th century. In the late 1960s the Roslyn Landmark Society worked to protect and preserve the extant structures, culminating in the Register listing. The Roslyn Village Historic District, added 15 years later in 1987, also included the Main Street district as a component area.

== Significant Contributing Properties ==
Several of the district's properties are notable within it:

- Ellen E. Ward Memorial Clock Tower: Built in 1895 of random ashlar granite and limestone trim and located at the intersection of Main and Old Northern, it has become one of Roslyn's most visible local landmarks. The tower was designed by the New York firm of Lamb & Rich, and the clock mechanism itself by the Seth Thomas Clock Company.
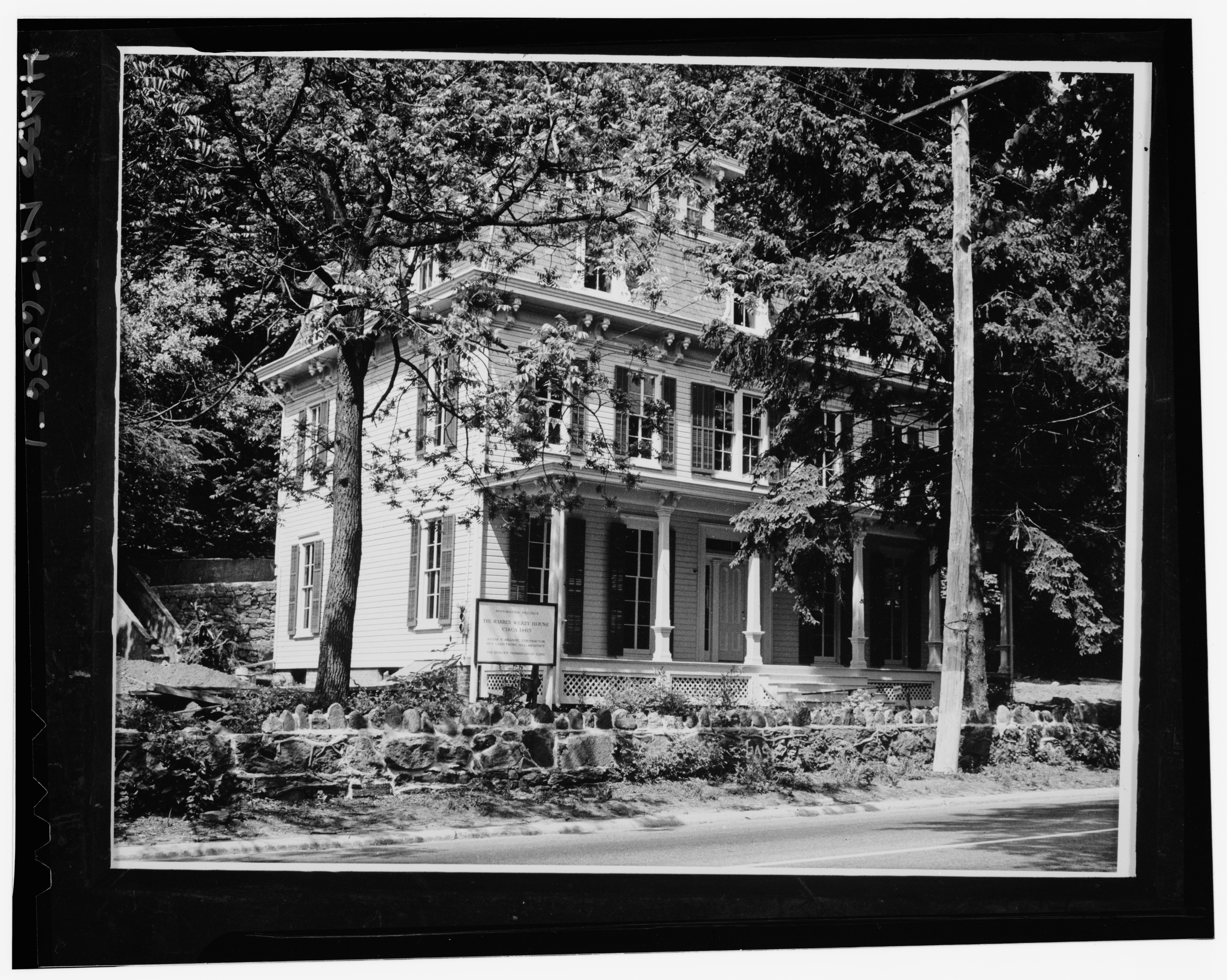
- Warren Wilkey House on Main Street in Roslyn, New York
  William G. Valentine Store. Was one of the rare brick buildings from 19th-century Roslyn. Valentine reportedly acquired the brick at low cost during the economic downtimes that preceded the Civil War, and from them built his store. His Emporium was run out of the neighboring wooden shingle buildings at 17-21 Main Street.
- Obadiah W. Valentine House, 105 Main Street. A clapboard Greek Revival structure built between 1833 and 1836, its one-and-a-half-story height appears a story higher due to its construction into the steep slope on the west side of the street at this point. Several other nearby houses emulated the design.
- Warren Wilkey House, 190 Main Street. Built for a successful New York businessman around 1865, this wood-frame house is unusually large and ornate by Main Street standards. It actually is two and a half stories high, with a mansard roof and elaborated belvedere. In 1925 it was converted into three apartments.
- Van Nostrand-Starkins House, 221 Main Street. A one-and-a-half-story clapboard structure begun in 1680, making it the oldest in the village, it was purchased by blacksmith Joseph Starkins in 1795. A later frame wing has been moved back, and the house has been restored to its 1810 appearance by the Roslyn Landmark Society. It is currently used as a museum.

== Preservation ==
Roslyn has added to its ordinances a provision protecting the buildings in both its historic districts. They are recognized in its zoning and any additions, demolition or alterations are subject to approval by the six-member Historic District Board. The Roslyn Landmark Society also holds a restrictive covenant on some of the properties.
