= Roslyn Grist Mill =

- U.S. National Register of Historic Places
- New York State Register of Historic Places
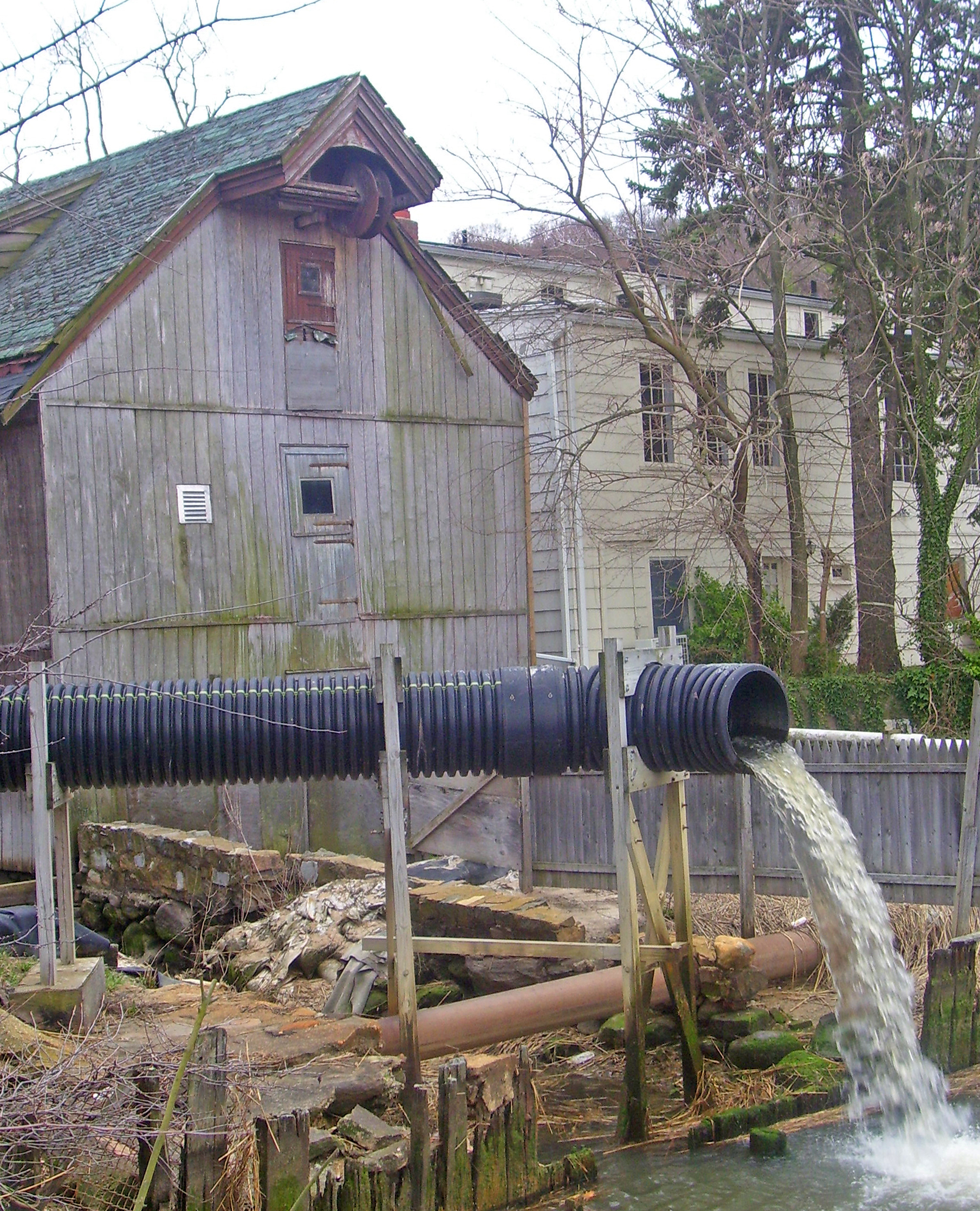
- Rear elevation of mill, with modern culvert, during 2008 renovations
- Location: Roslyn, New York United States
- Nearest city: Glen Cove
- Coordinates: 40°48′01″N 73°38′58″W
- Built: ca. 1715–1741
- MPS: Roslyn Village Multiple Resource Area
- NRHP reference No.: 86002638

Significant dates
- Added to NRHP: October 2, 1986
- Designated NYSRHP: August 15, 1986

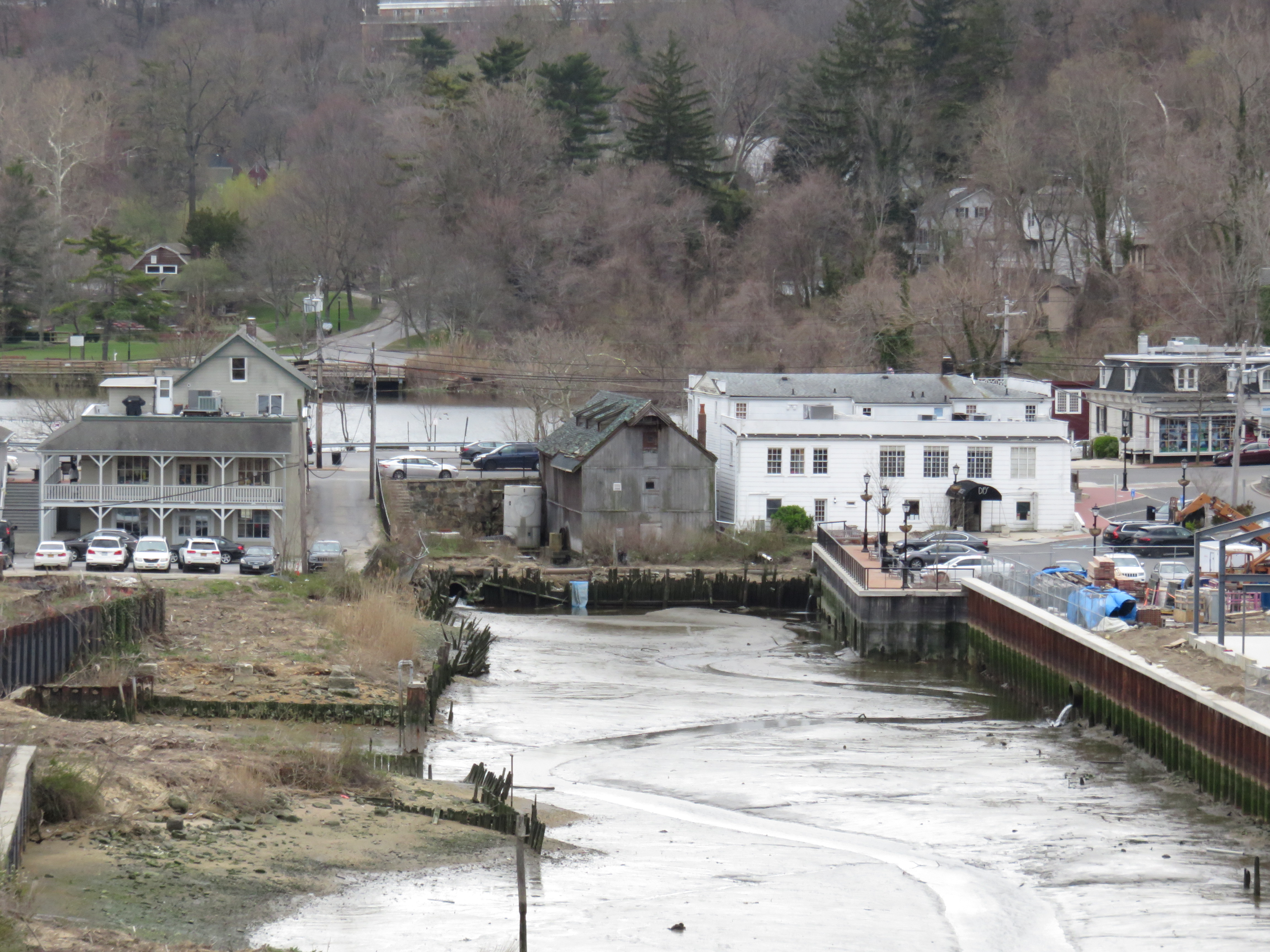
The mill viewed from the Roslyn Viaduct

The Roslyn Grist Mill is a historic gristmill and future museum, located along Old Northern Boulevard within the Incorporated Village of Roslyn, in Nassau County, New York, United States. It was built at some point before the mid-18th century and is one of the few surviving Dutch colonial commercial frame buildings in the United States.

Listed on both the National Register of Historic Places and the New York State Register of Historic Places in 1986, the historic structure is currently being restored by the Roslyn Landmark Society, for use as a museum.

== Building ==
The 2 1/2-story rectangular mill is 50 feet 6 inches (15.39 m) long by 25 feet (7.6 m) wide. The original timber framing, which uses a series of transverse post and beam bents connected by sills and wall plates, differing from the traditional European grid pattern, is now covered in weatherboard. A 1 1/2-story wing is located to the west, above the race. A mill pond, incorporated into the Roslyn Village Historic District unlike the actual mill itself, is to the north, its outlet eventually feeding into Long Island Sound.

The ground floor has, in the past, been dropped about 12 feet (3.7 m) below street level, due to the effect of tides and renovations on its footings. A hook-and-pulley double plank door is located in the center of the attic. Windows are irregularly located, since many have been either added over time or boarded over. Some of the original milling equipment – primarily gears – remained inside the structure as of 1986.

== History ==
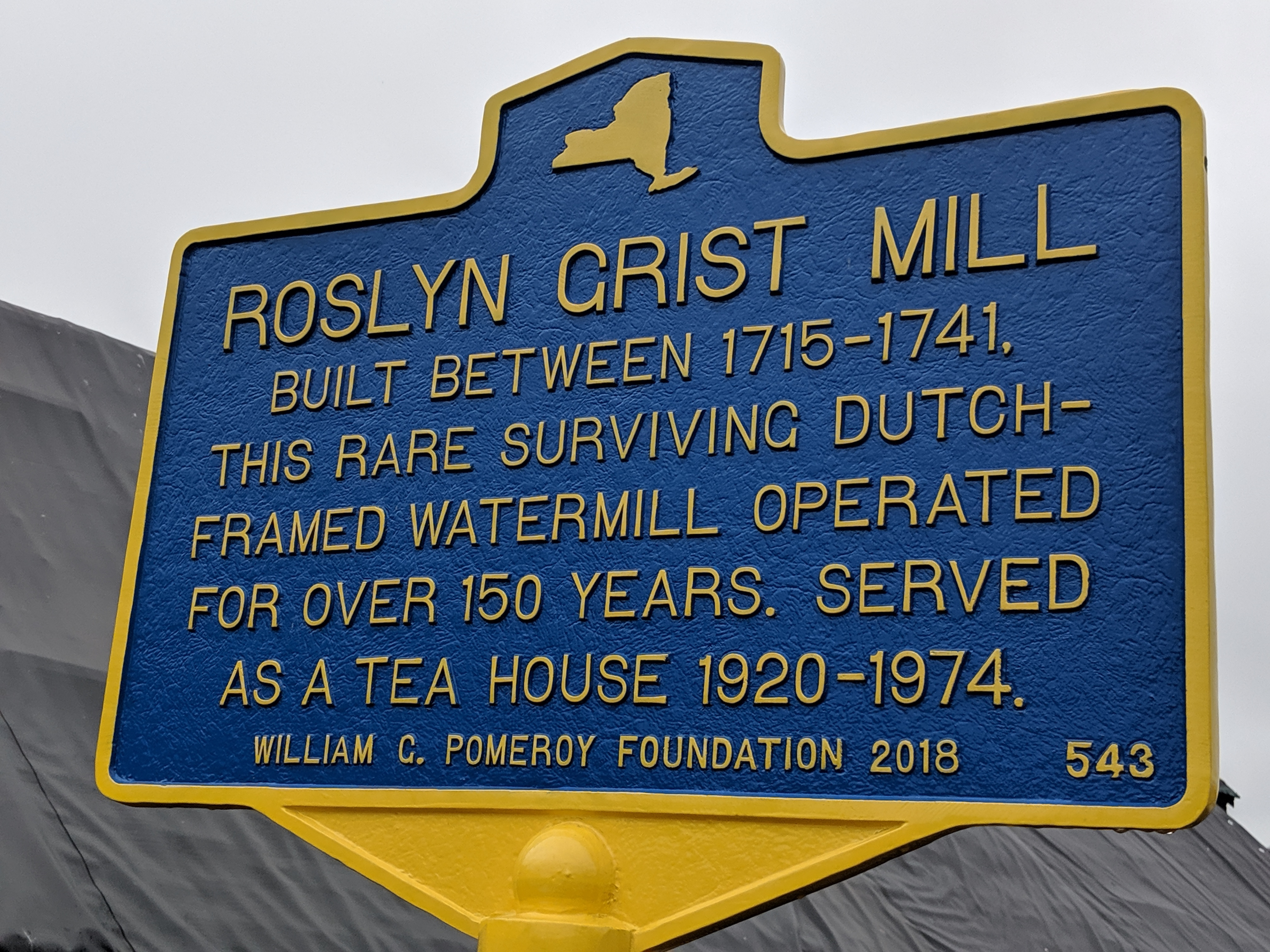
Roslyn Grist Mill historic marker

A gristmill has existed on the site since the first decade of the 18th century, when John Robeson built on it. He in turn sold it to Jeremiah Williams, who is believed to have built the current mill sometime between 1715 and 1741. After another owner, it became the property of Hendrick Onderdonk, who already operated two paper mills in the settlement then known as Hempstead Harbor, in 1758.

He ran the mill profitably, and hosted George Washington, who mentions the mill in his diary, on a 1790 visit to the area. The Onderdonk family sold it in 1801 to Daniel Hoogland and Abraham Coles. They sold in 1849 to Joseph Hicks, whose family continued to operate it as a mill until 1916, when they converted it into a tea house and museum. That use continued until 1975, when the Nassau County Department of Parks, Recreation and Museums took it over.

During the county's ownership, the building remained vacant. Neither a new use or a new tenant could be found, and it continued to deteriorate.

=== 21st century restoration ===
In the 2000s, Roslyn citizens got Nassau County to begin efforts to restore the grist mill, through a restoration project ultimately expected to cost $2 million; the project is funded by the county, village, and matching contributions from the community.As part of the project, the mill will be raised back up to street level. Ultimately, when the work is complete, the county will transfer title to the village, which will let the Roslyn Landmark Society operate it as a museum of the water-powered industries like Onderdonk's that once were so numerous in the village.

In 2020, during the restoration, a time capsule was found embedded in concrete that dated to an earlier restoration in 1917. George Gorski, a Woodbury-based carpenter working on converting the mill into a museum, unearthed a half-pint milk bottle from the Alex Campbell Milk Co., a defunct Long Island distributor. Inside were four coins, a Civil War Army & Navy token (Da.1863), an Indian head penny (Da.1881), a Haitian 20 centimes (Da.1863) and an Indian head penny (Da.1905). There were two letters, one in English that was barely legible and one in Italian by an Artisan, Romolo Caparelli, who was from Pico, Italy. That letter was translated by a Cultural studies professor at Stony Brook University; it will be displayed at the mill when the restoration is complete. The other was from a Roslyn builder and descendant of a Hessian soldier who fought in the American Revolution, Steven Speedling, detailing the workers on the earlier restoration.

In 2022, the Roslyn Landmark Society – in partnership with United States Representative Thomas R. Suozzi (D–Glen Cove) – secured federal funds for the project, through the Save America's Treasures program. Two years later, in 2024, construction work on the new foundation for the Roslyn Grist Mill was completed, and the restoration project entered its second phase later that year.

In 2025 – one year after the new foundation had been completed, the Roslyn Landmark Society secured a $625,000 grant from New York state to cover additional project costs. Later that year, Nassau County awarded the $2 million in funds that had long been earmarked for the project in its budget, to complete the final phase of the restoration project.

== See also ==
- List of tide mills on Long Island
- National Register of Historic Places listings in North Hempstead (town), New York
- Saddle Rock Grist Mill
- Stony Brook Grist Mill
