= Willet Titus House =

Historic house in New York, United States

- U.S. National Register of Historic Places
- New York State Register of Historic Places
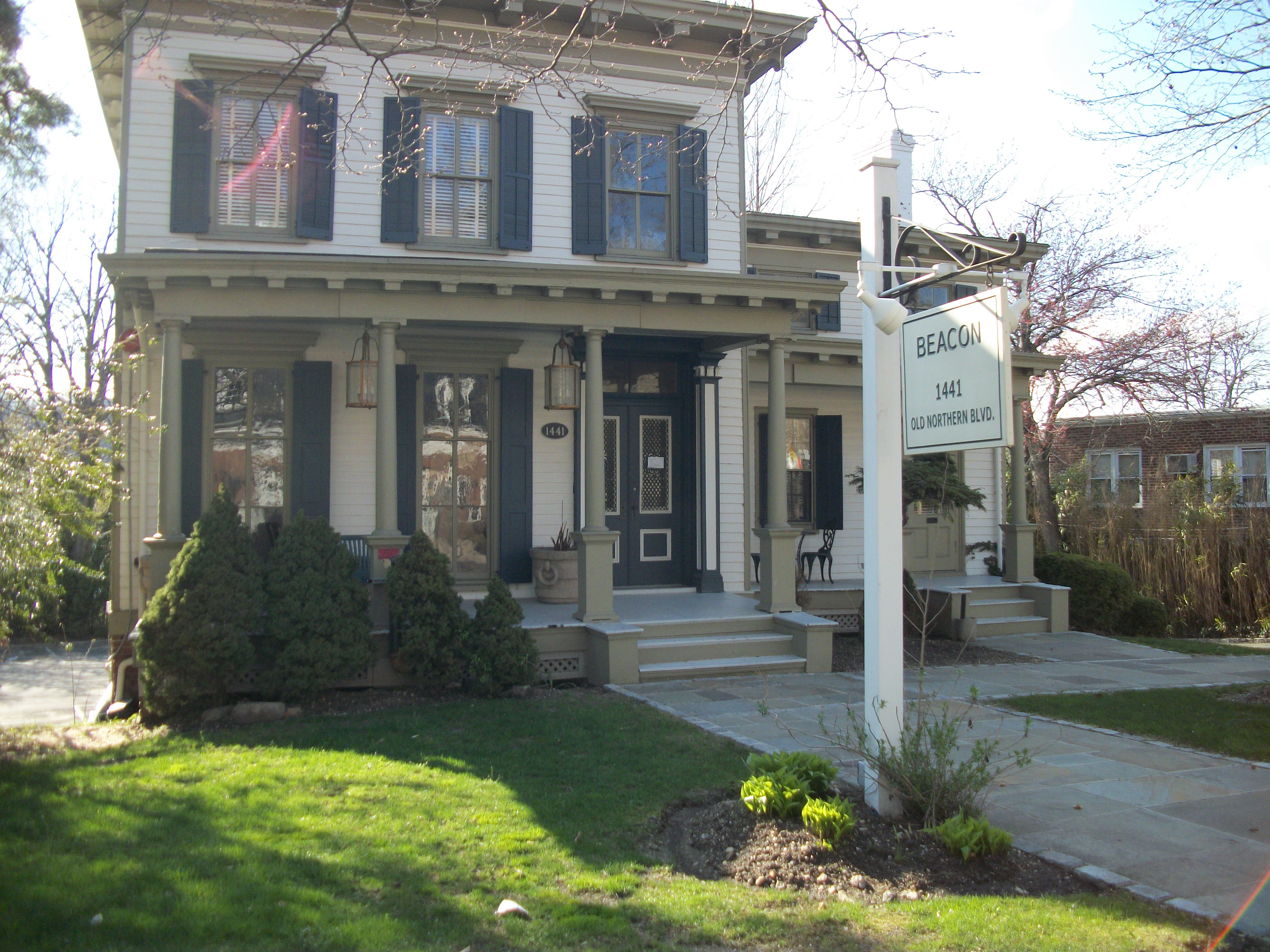
- The Willet Titus House, seen from Old Northern Boulevard

- Location within New York Location within the United States
- Location: 1441 Old Northern Boulevard; Roslyn, New York
- Coordinates: 40°48′11″N 73°38′50″W
- Area: 0.5 acres (0.20 ha)
- Built: 1860
- Architectural style: Italianate
- MPS: Roslyn Village MRA
- NRHP reference No.: 86002652

Significant dates
- Added to NRHP: October 2, 1986
- Designated NYSRHP: August 15, 1986

The Willet Titus House is a historic residential building located within the Incorporated Village of Roslyn, in Nassau County, New York, United States.

== Description ==
The building is a 2-story Italianate-style frame house with an above-grade basement story at the west end. It consists of a 2-story, rectangular main block with a three-bay side entrance facade and a recessed 1 1/2-story two-bay wing.

The Willet Titus House additionally features porches at the front of the main block and wing.

== History ==
The building was built about 1860. It was added to the New York State Register of Historic Places on August 15,1986. It was subsequently further listed on the National Register of Historic Places on October 2, 1986,

== See also ==
- Hicks Lumber Company Store
- Roslyn Grist Mill
