= Ellen E. Ward Memorial Clock Tower =

- Ellen E. Ward Memorial Clock Tower (a.k.a.; Roslyn Clock Tower)
- U.S. Historic district – Contributing property
- New York State Register of Historic Places
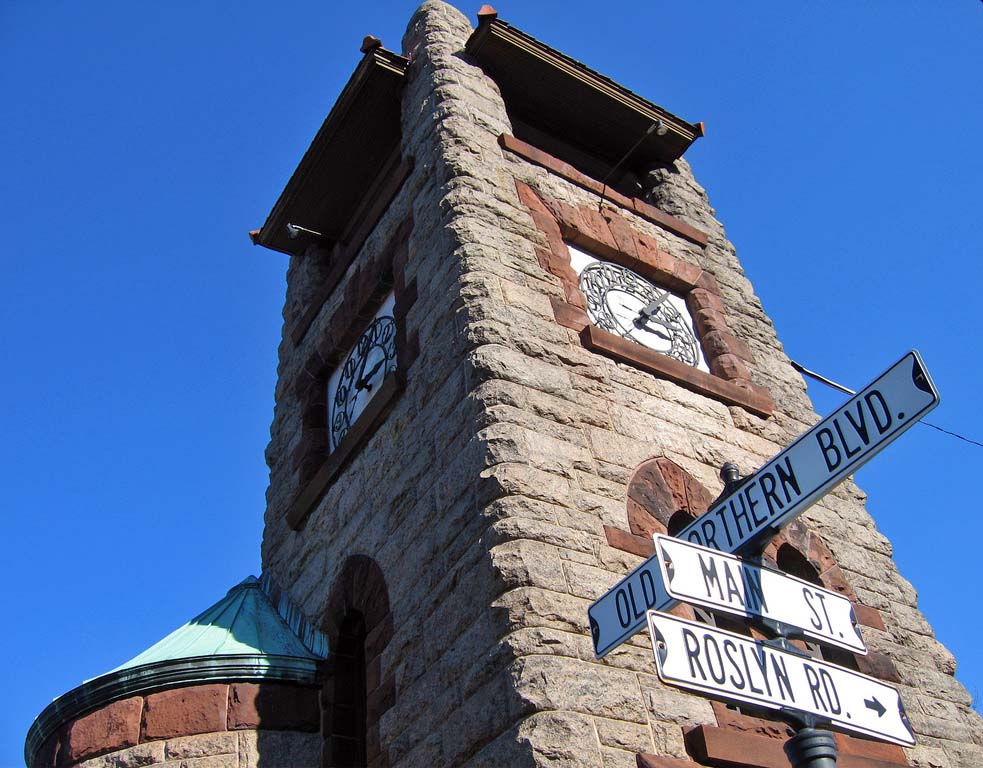
- The clock tower in 2008.

- Location within New York Location within the United States
- Interactive map
- Location: Main Street, Old Northern Boulevard & Tower Plaza, Roslyn, New York
- Coordinates: 40.7997°N 73.6505°W
- Built: 1895
- Architect: Lamb and Rich
- Part of: Main Street Historic District (ID74001266)
- Designated CP: 1974

The Ellen E. Ward Memorial Clock Tower (also known as the Roslyn Clock Tower) is a historic clock tower in the Village of Roslyn, Nassau County, New York. It is considered the symbol of Roslyn and appears on that village's official seal.

== History ==
The clock tower was constructed in 1895 as a memorial to Ellen E. Ward (1826–1893), who was a prominent and active Roslyn resident best known for donating the historic horse trough located within the village. The tower was commissioned by Ward's children. The tower was designed by the firm of Lamb and Rich.

The clock tower was rehabilitated in the 1990s and 2000s, and for its centennial in 1995, the Town of North Hempstead sold the tower to the Village of Roslyn for $1. The rehabilitation efforts experienced delays in the 2000s due to various reasons, including trouble securing grant money from New York following the September 11, 2001 terrorist attacks. The rehabilitation efforts were finally completed after 11 years in 2006.

It is listed on both the National Register of Historic Places and on the New York State Register of Historic Places, and is a contributing property to the Main Street Historic District.

== Specifications ==
- Tower height: approximately 44 feet (13 m) (although some sources claim it is approximately 55 feet (17 m))
- Exterior materials: granite & sandstone
- Clockworks manufacturer: Seth Thomas & Co.
- Clock type: weight-driven
- Bell weight: approximately 2,700 pounds (1,200 kg)

== See also ==
- Main Street Historic District (Roslyn, New York)
- National Register of Historic Places listings in North Hempstead (town), New York.
