= Roslyn National Bank and Trust Company Building =

Historic commercial building in New York, United States

- U.S. National Register of Historic Places
- New York State Register of Historic Places
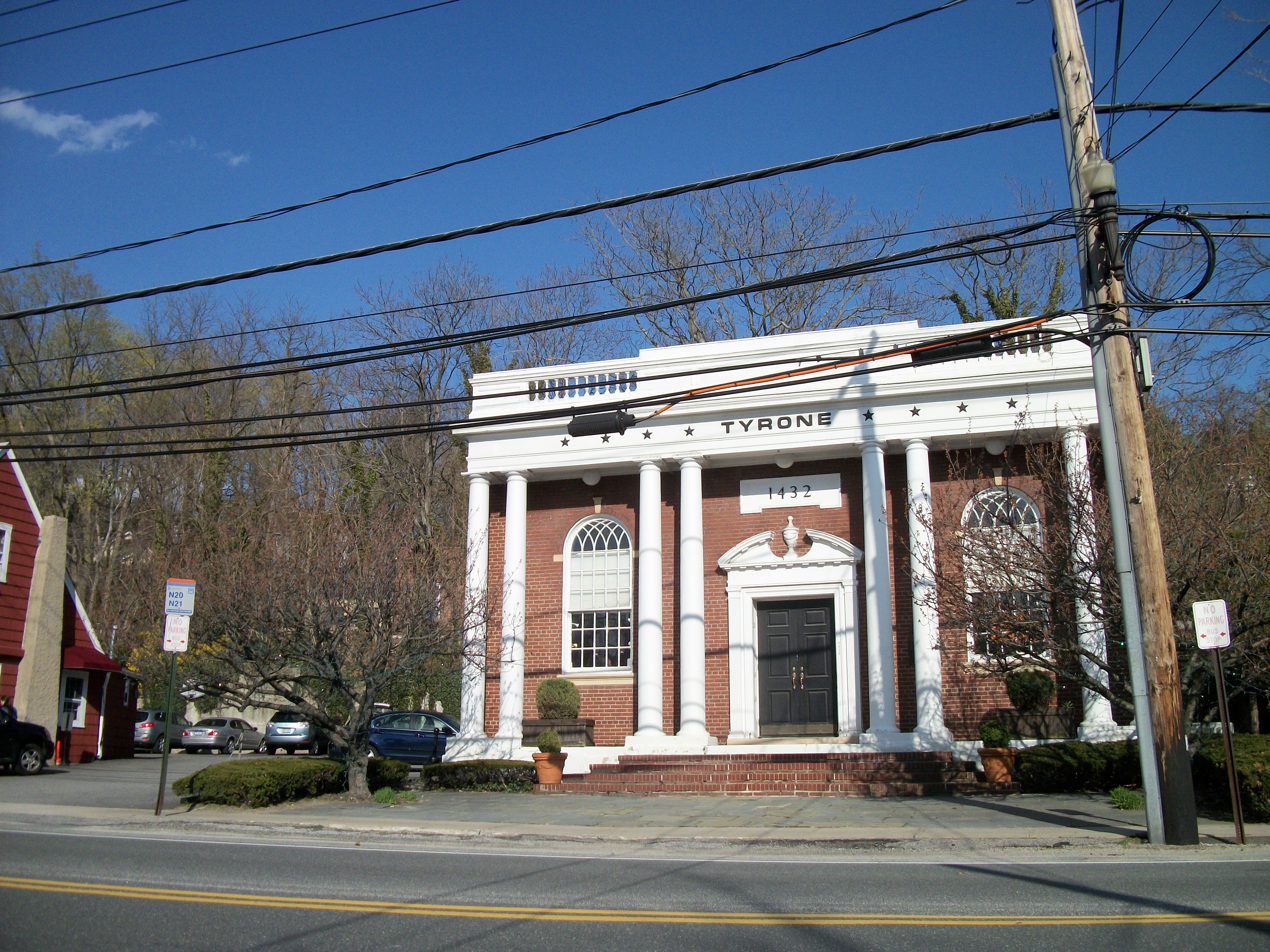
- The Roslyn National Bank and Trust Building Company Building, seen in 2011

- Location within New York Location within the United States
- Location: 1432 Old Northern Blvd., Roslyn, New York
- Coordinates: 40°48′6.49″N 73°38′48.95″W
- Built: 1931
- Architect: Tubby, William Bunker
- Architectural style: Classical Revival
- MPS: Roslyn Village MRA
- NRHP reference No.: 86002639

Significant dates
- Added to NRHP: October 2, 1986
- Designated NYSRHP: August 15, 1986

The Roslyn National Bank and Trust Company Building is a historic commercial building located in the Incorporated Village of Roslyn in Nassau County, New York, United States.

== Description ==
The building was designed by architect William Bunker Tubby and was built in 1931 to serve as the new headquarters for the Roslyn National Bank and Trust Company. Located on the northeastern corner of Old Northern Boulevard and Remsen Avenue, it is a one-story, rectangular brick building with a flat roof in a modified Classical Revival style. The front facade is three bays wide and features a Tuscan order wood portico with paired columns.

In 1951, the Roslyn National Bank and Trust Company moved its headquarters from this building to a new, A. Stanley Miller-designed location in nearby Flower Hill, wedged between Northern Boulevard (NY 25A), Mineola Avenue, and Old Northern Boulevard.

Following the bank's relocating to its new location, the building subsequently served as the home of the Nassau County Tuberculosis and Public Health Association and, subsequently, the Tyrone Men's Clothing, Sportswear and Accessories store; the store closed in 2019 and a new tenant has since moved in.

The building was added to the New York State Register of Historic Places and the National Register of Historic Places in 1986.

== See also ==
- Roslyn Savings Bank Building – Another NRHP-listed bank building in Roslyn, located down the street.
