= Rescue Hook & Ladder Company No. 1 Firehouse =

- U.S. National Register of Historic Places
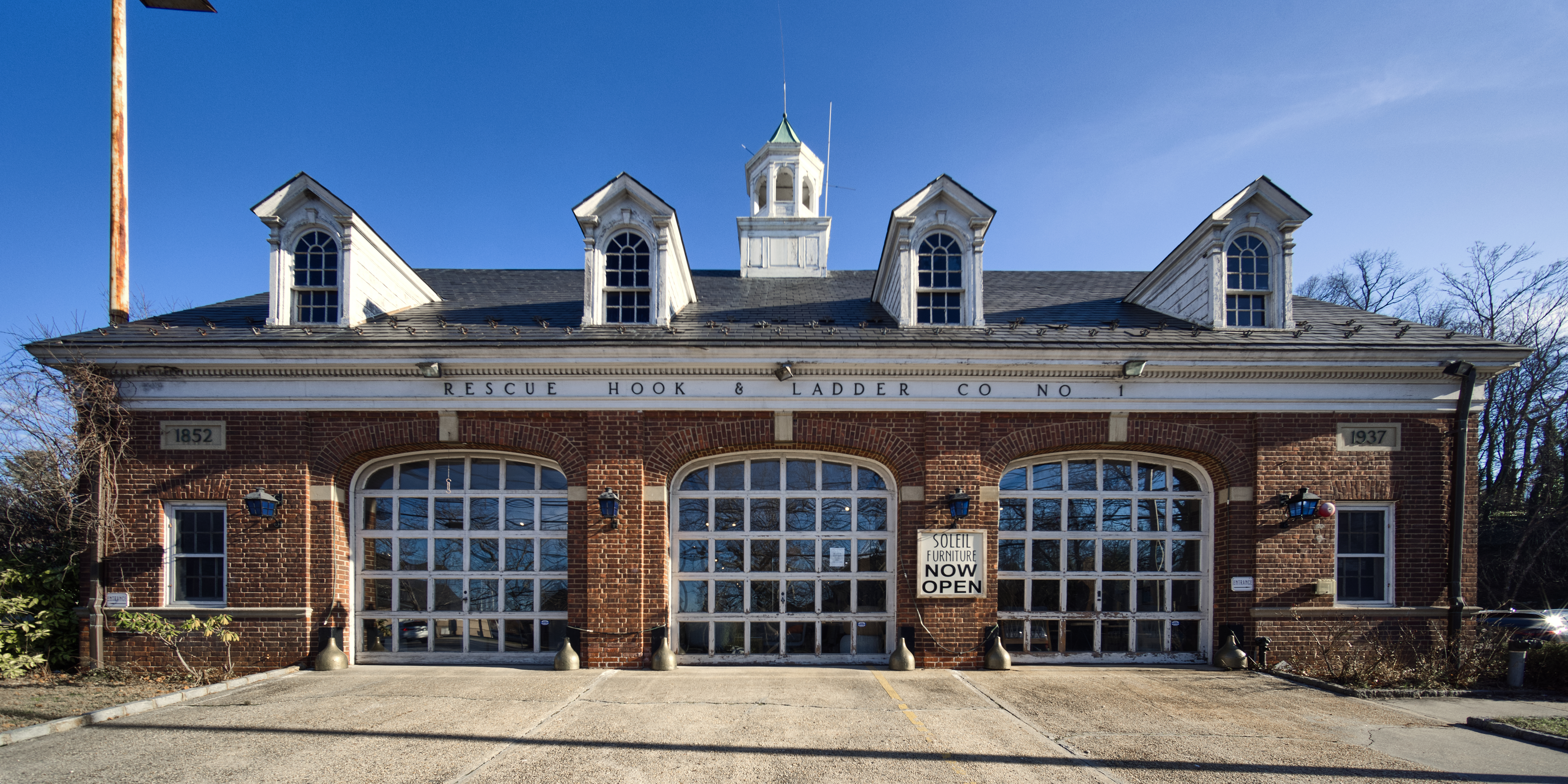
- Roslyn's historic firehouse; Rescue Hook & Ladder Company #1 in 2022.

- Location within New York Location within the United States
- Location: Junction of School Street and Skillman Street, Roslyn, New York
- Coordinates: 40°48′10″N 73°38′48″W
- Area: less than one acre
- Built: 1937
- Architect: Johanson, H. William
- Architectural style: Colonial Revival
- MPS: Roslyn Village MRA
- NRHP reference No.: 91000480
- Added to NRHP: May 6, 1991

The Rescue Hook & Ladder Company No. 1 Firehouse is a historic fire station located in the village of Roslyn, in Nassau County, New York, United States.

== Description ==
Although the department was established on November 1, 1852, the Colonial Revival style firehouse itself was built in 1937 and designed by prominent Roslyn-based architect Henry W. Johanson. It was subsequently sold, repurposed, and renovated – and it now houses a retail business.

The new Roslyn Hook & Ladder Company No. 1 firehouse, dedicated in 1986, is a Brobdingnagian structure containing five fire trucks and larger equipment, towering over the Roslyn Plaza, which had fallen victim to the Town of North Hempstead's asphalt- and concrete- philosophy, demolishing 19th century structures for the Long Island Railroad's expansive parking lot. The volunteer firefighter brigade has claimed several championships over the years in competitions with other firehouses.

It was added to the National Register of Historic Places on May 6, 1991.

== See also ==
- National Register of Historic Places listings in North Hempstead (town), New York
