= Old Northern Boulevard =

Major road in Nassau County, New York

- Old Northern Boulevard, highlighted in red

Route information
- Maintained by NCDPW
- Length: 2.4 mi (3.9 km)

Major junctions
- West end: NY 25A in Flower Hill & Roslyn Estates
- Mineola Avenue (CR E64); West Shore Road (CR 15); Main Street (CR 7A); East Broadway (CR C65); Bryant Avenue (CR C26)
- East end: NY 25A in Roslyn

Location
- Country: United States
- State: New York
- County: Nassau

Highway system
- County routes in New York; County Routes in Nassau County

Old Northern Boulevard (commonly referred to as Old Northern) is a major, 2.4-mile (3.9 km) road in Nassau County, on Long Island, New York. It is a bypassed section of Northern Boulevard (NY 25A) between Middle Neck Road in Flower Hill & The Locusts in Roslyn Estates, east through Roslyn, with NY 25A being the termini for both ends of the road.

Formerly part of NY 25A, the road is today owned by Nassau County and maintained by the Nassau County Department of Public Works; it now serves as portions of the alignments of three unsigned county routes: Nassau County Route 7A, Nassau County Route C65, and Nassau County Route D71.

== Route description ==
Old Northern Boulevard begins as CR D71 at a junction with Northern Boulevard (NY 25A), Middle Neck Road, and The Locusts at the border between the Incorporated Villages of Flower Hill and Roslyn Estates. It proceeds east along the border, eventually reaching Mineola Avenue (CR E64). From there, it enters the Village of Roslyn, and it descends and winds its way down to its intersection with West Shore Road (CR 15). Upon reaching this intersection, Old Northern Boulevard veers to the south to its intersection with Main Street (CR 7A), in front of the Ellen E. Ward Memorial Clock Tower in the heart of Roslyn's downtown; CR D71 and CR7A overlap between these two intersections. It then veers back to the east to get to the east side of Hempstead Harbor and the Roslyn Creek, crossing the Mill Dam and passing through the Roslyn Village Historic District, eventually reaching an intersection with East Broadway (CR C65) in front of the Roslyn Savings Bank Building; this marks the eastern terminus of the CR D71 designation, which is superseded by the CR C65 designation from here to the eastern terminus of Old Northern Boulevard. Old Northern Boulevard – now CR C65 – then veers to the north and quickly curves towards the northeast, soon reaching a junction with Bryant Avenue (CR 26) and then intersecting Skillman Street immediately thereafter. It then proceeds northeast, merging into eastbound Northern Boulevard (NY 25A) just west of Sinclair Martin Drive.

== History ==
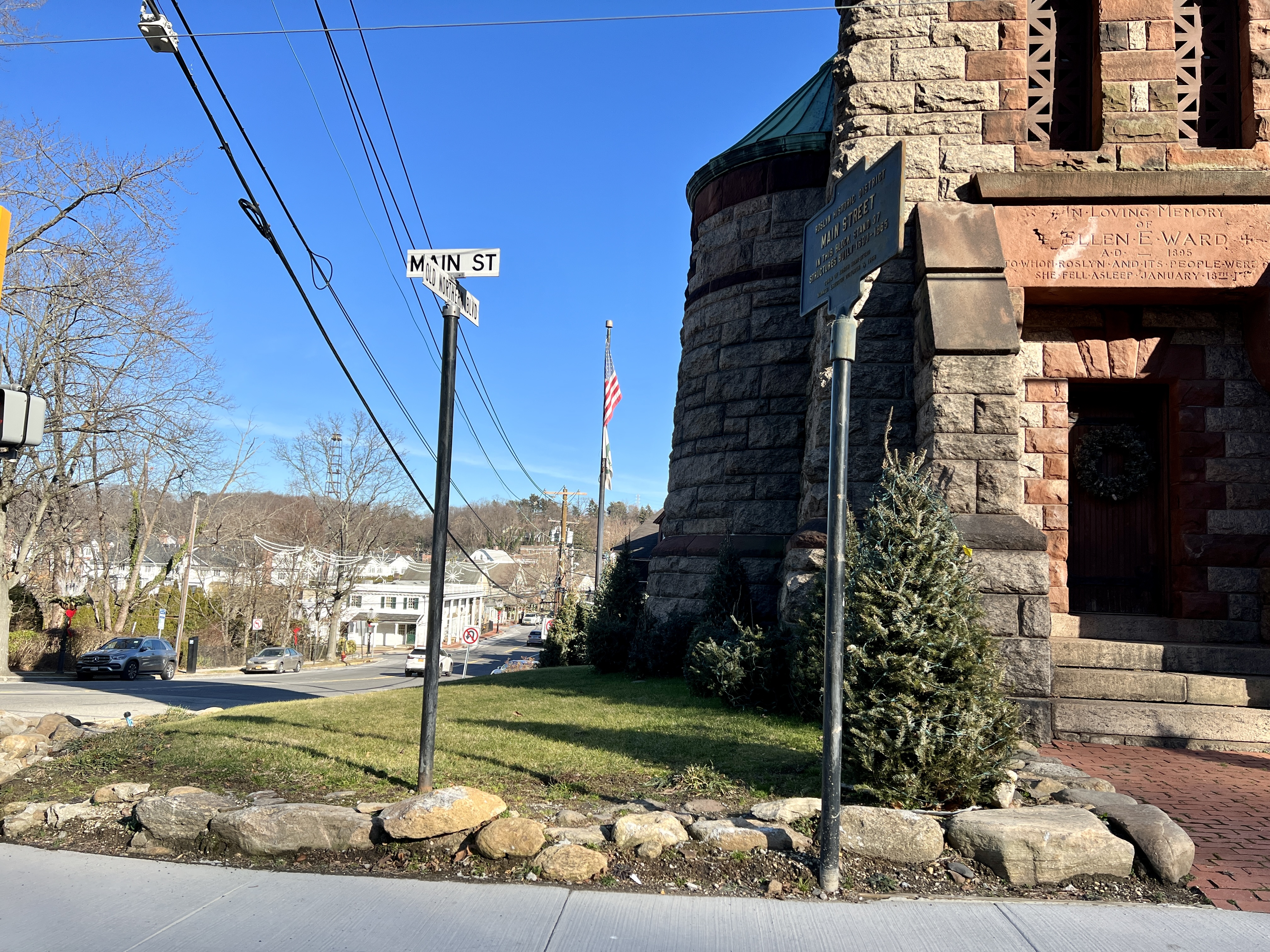
Old Northern Boulevard in the heart of Roslyn, as seen from Main Street (CR 7A).

Old Northern Boulevard was historically part of the Flushing and North Hempstead Turnpike (modern-day Northern Boulevard) – a major toll road linking Flushing and points west with North Hempstead (including Roslyn) and points east. New York State Route 25A followed this route through the heart of Roslyn, to serve the community and wind around Hempstead Harbor. By 1940s, the stretch of NY 25A through Roslyn had become notorious for chronic traffic jams – in some cases, so severe that it took an hour to cross through Roslyn. As a result, the New York State Department of Public Works (a predecessor of today's New York State Department of Transportation) constructed a bypass route to its north, between Middle Neck Road and just east of Bryant Avenue. Known as the Roslyn Cut-Off, the new highway completely bypassed this original stretch of Northern Boulevard through Roslyn, by means of a new viaduct spanning Hempstead Harbor; the bridge would come to be known as the Roslyn Viaduct – and later, the William Cullen Bryant Viaduct.

Upon the opening of the Bryant Viaduct, NY 25A was shifted onto the new highway, and the original stretch through Roslyn became known as Old Northern Boulevard. Ownership of Old Northern Boulevard was subsequently transferred from the State of New York to Nassau County. Nassau County then designated it as CR 25A.

In the 1960s, an infamous hairpin curve at the intersection of Old Northern Boulevard and West Shore Road (CR 15) was eliminated, and the road was widened through a controversial reconstruction project.

In the late 1980s, the road was rehabilitated through the downtown area of Roslyn. As part of the project, the concrete sidewalks through the historic downtown were replaced with brick ones, to further preserve the downtown area's character and history. The sidewalk bricking also coincided with a major flood control project along the road, which had been delayed since first being proposed in 1972. Twenty new trees were also planted as part of the project.

Like all other county routes in Nassau County, Old Northern Boulevard became unsigned in the 1970s, when Nassau County officials opted to remove the signs as opposed to allocating the funds for replacing them with new ones that met the latest federal design standards and requirements, as per the federal government's Manual on Uniform Traffic Control Devices. The route numbers for the road were subsequently altered.

=== Landmarks ===
Several landmarks, including many listed on the National Register of Historic Places, are located along Old Northern Boulevard – such as the Ellen E. Ward Memorial Clock Tower, the Roslyn Grist Mill, the Roslyn Savings Bank Building, the Roslyn National Bank and Trust Company Building, the Willet Titus House, and the old Rescue Hook & Ladder Company No. 1 Firehouse. Furthermore, the road is the main thoroughfare through the Roslyn Village Historic District.

== Major intersections ==
Location	mi	km	Destinations	Notes
Flower Hill–Roslyn Estates line	0.00	0.00	NY 25A (Northern Boulevard) – New York, Calverton; Middle Neck Road; The Locusts	Western terminus; no access to eastbound NY 25A from Old Northern Boulevard, or access to Old Northern Boulevard from westbound NY 25A.
Flower Hill–Roslyn Estates– Roslyn tripoint	0.24	0.39	Mineola Avenue (CR E64)	
Roslyn	0.6 7.16	0.97 11.52	West Shore Road (CR 15)	Northern terminus of CR 7A and southern terminus of CR 15; eastern terminus of the western segment of CR D71; Old Northern Boulevard assumes CR 7A's mileage scheme
Roslyn	6.92 0.00	11.14 0.00	Main Street (CR 7A)	Western terminus of eastern segment of CR D71; mileage reverts to 0
Roslyn	0.21 0.47	0.34 0.76	East Broadway (CR C65)	Eastern terminus of CR D71; becomes part of CR C65 and adopts the latter's mileage scheme
Roslyn	0.59	0.95	Bryant Avenue (CR 26)	Access to/from westbound NY 25A, via Bryant Avenue and Wittes Lane
Roslyn	0.76	1.22	NY 25A (Northern Boulevard) – New York, Calverton	Eastern terminus; access only to/from eastbound NY 25A
1.000 mi = 1.609 km; 1.000 km = 0.621 mi: Incomplete access; Route transition

== See also ==
- List of county routes in Nassau County, New York
- William Cullen Bryant Viaduct
