= William Cullen Bryant Viaduct =

Bridge in Flower Hill and Roslyn, New York

William Cullen Bryant Viaduct (Roslyn Viaduct)
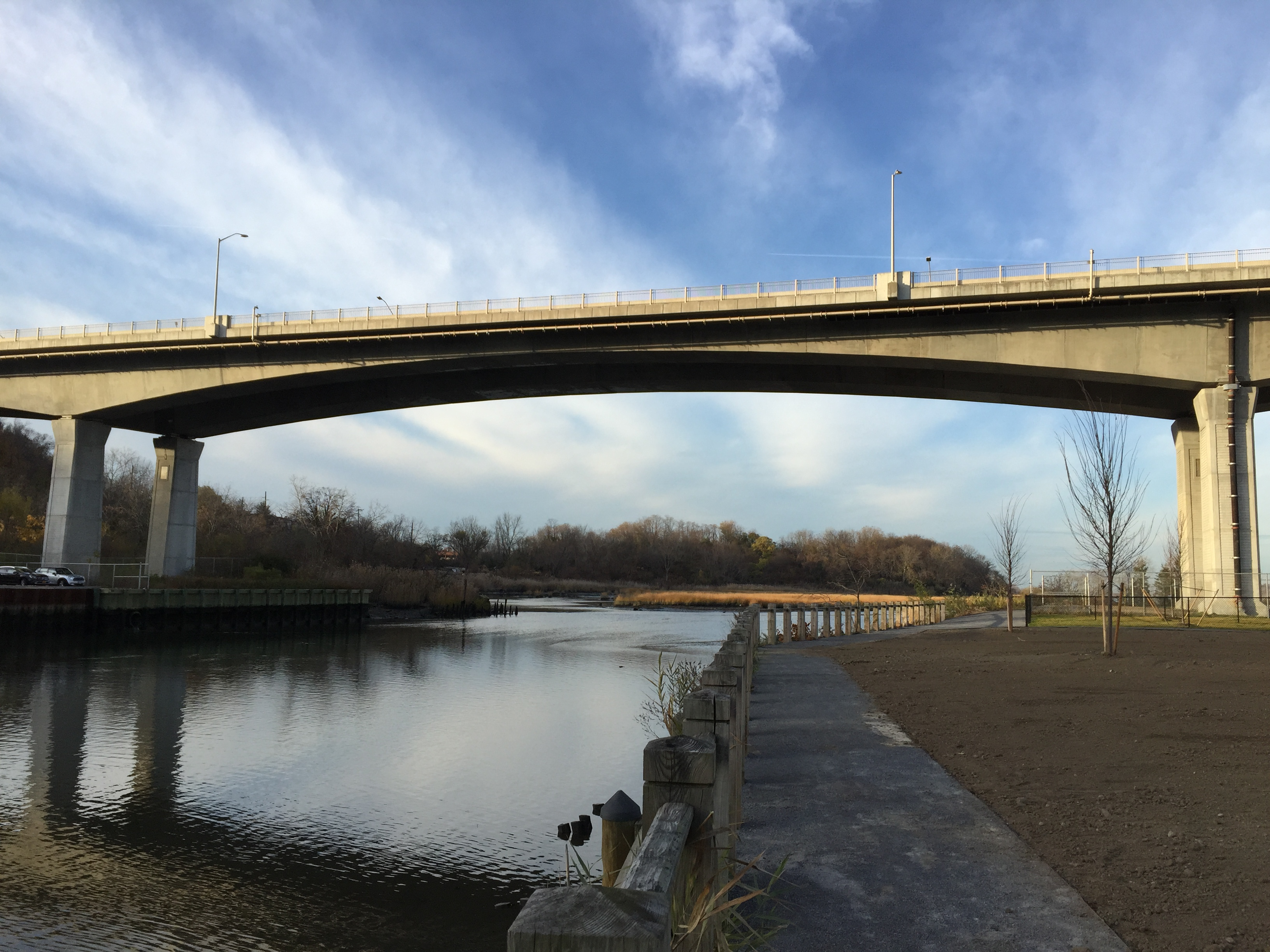
- The Bryant Viaduct's span over Hempstead Harbor in 2015, looking north.
- Coordinates: 40°48′14″N 73°39′04″W
- Carries: NY 25A (Northern Boulevard)
- Crosses: Hempstead Harbor
- Locale: Flower Hill and Roslyn, New York, United States
- Named for: William Cullen Bryant
- Owner: New York State Department of Transportation
- Maintained by: NYSDOT

Characteristics
- Design: Precast concrete segmental bridge
- Total length: 0.50 mi (0.80 km)
- No. of lanes: 4 (2 in each direction)
- Design life: 75 years

History
- Construction end: 1949 (original bridge); 2012 (current bridge)
- Opened: January 3, 1950

Statistics
- Daily traffic: Approx. 38,000 vehicles daily (2005)

Location
- Interactive map of William Cullen Bryant Viaduct (Roslyn Viaduct)

The William Cullen Bryant Viaduct (historically known as the Roslyn Viaduct) is a viaduct that carries four lanes of Northern Boulevard (NY 25A) over Hempstead Harbor between the Incorporated Villages of Flower Hill and Roslyn, in Nassau County, on Long Island, in New York, United States.

The Bryant Viaduct was built as part of the Roslyn Bypass, which serves as a bypass of Roslyn's downtown. The original bridge opened in 1950 and was replaced with a more modern one in phases between 2005 and 2012.

== Overview ==
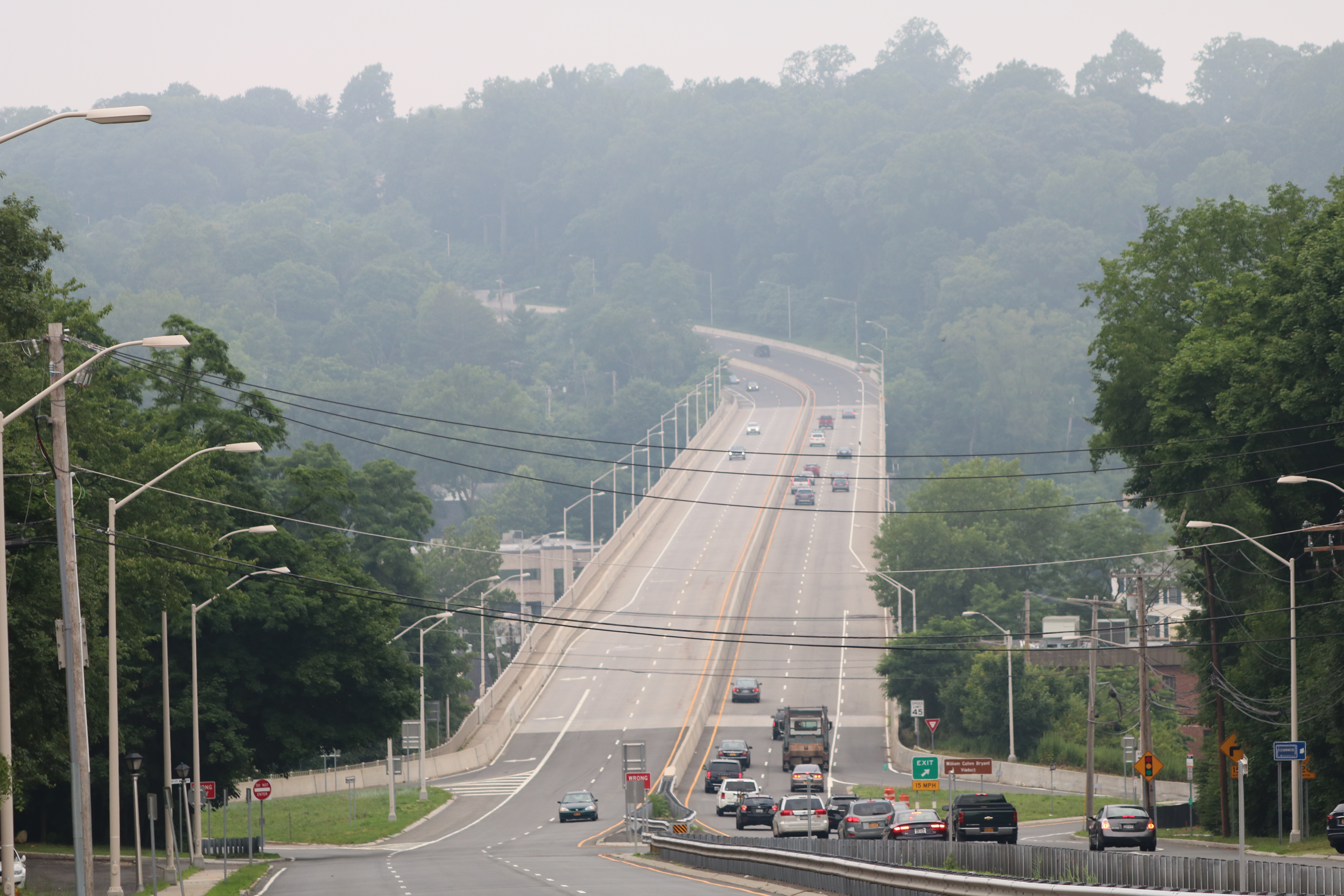
The Bryant Viaduct in 2015, looking west.

Construction on the Bryant Viaduct and the rest of the Roslyn Bypass commenced in the mid-1940s, after several years of delays and World War II-related material shortages. The highway and its bridge, which had been compared to New Jersey's Pulaski Skyway, were planned in order to eliminate severe congestion on the existing route through Roslyn, which had long been considered one of the worst traffic bottlenecks on Long Island.

== History ==
=== Original bridge (1949–2012) ===
The original bridge was completed in 1949, and a ceremony was held on October 21 of that year by Governor Thomas E. Dewey. It officially opened a few months later, on January 3, 1950. The four-lane bridge was built using a pin and hanger design. The construction and subsequent opening of the bridge eliminated the traffic bottleneck on Main Street and Old Northern Boulevard in the heart of Roslyn that had resulted from the increasing number of automobiles on the roads. The bridge's substructure was engineered by Senior & Palmer, while its superstructure was engineered by the American Bridge Company.

Lighting was added to the bridge in 1956, after Nassau County agreed to cover the costs in lieu of the Village of Roslyn. The lights were installed along the median of the bridge, which had been designed and constructed with provisions being made for their future installation.

By the 1990s, the bridge was beginning to show its age. Advancements in bridge engineering and safety rendered the structure obsolete; New York stopped using the pin and hanger design for building bridges in 1968. Additionally, there were concerns regarding the bridge's structural integrity – most notably after the 1983 Mianus River Bridge Disaster, in which a similarly designed bridge carrying Interstate 95 over the Mianus River in Connecticut collapsed due to defects in its pin and hanger system. The Bryant Viaduct subsequently received modifications over the next couple years to safeguard it and its pin and hanger design from experiencing such a failure.

After careful consideration, officials ultimately decided to replace the bridge with a new one up to modern standards. Initial development for the project first took place between 1992 and 1993.

=== Current bridge (2012–present) ===
In 2005, construction commenced on a replacement bridge, as the original one was in a state of disrepair, was structurally-obsolete, lacked shoulders, and exceeded its intended use life. Given the lack of efficient detour routes, construction was carried out in phases; one side would remain open whilst the other was demolished and rebuilt. Three lanes would be in use at any given time, and their directions would be reversible; in the mornings, there would be two westbound lanes and one eastbound lane, and the afternoons/evenings would see two eastbound lanes and one westbound lane.

Construction was originally intended to be completed by 2007 – but numerous factors led to multiple delays & setbacks, and the replacement bridge was ultimately completed in 2012. The new bridge features many enhancements, including a shoulder lane, an improved walkway compliant with the Americans with Disabilities Act of 1990, and better drainage. The new bridge is a total of 13 feet (4 Meters) wider than its predecessor.

The new Bryant Viaduct was built using precast concrete segments, and was the first bridge in the area to be built using this design method. The new bridge was designed by the New York City-based transportation engineering firm, Hardesty & Hanover.

==== Dedication & renaming, 2012 ====
In 2012, the Roslyn Viaduct was officially dedicated to – and renamed after – the late poet, journalist, and Roslyn resident, William Cullen Bryant; the bridge was officially renamed the William Cullen Bryant Viaduct. The project, executed through the passage of state legislation, was led by New York State Senators Jack M. Martins and Roy J. McDonald, along with New York State Assemblywoman Michelle E. Schimel.

The bill was sponsored in the New York State Senate by Senator Martins & co-sponsored by Senator Roy J. McDonald, and New York State Assemblywoman Michelle E. Schimel sponsored a sister bill in the New York State Assembly; both bills were passed in their respective legislative bodies.

Bryant, who had purchased a home in present-day Roslyn Harbor in 1843, was one of the most famous and influential residents in Roslyn's history.

== See also ==
- Hempstead Harbor
