= Roslyn Village Historic District =

Historic district in New York, United States

- U.S. National Register of Historic Places
- U.S. Historic district
- New York State Register of Historic Places
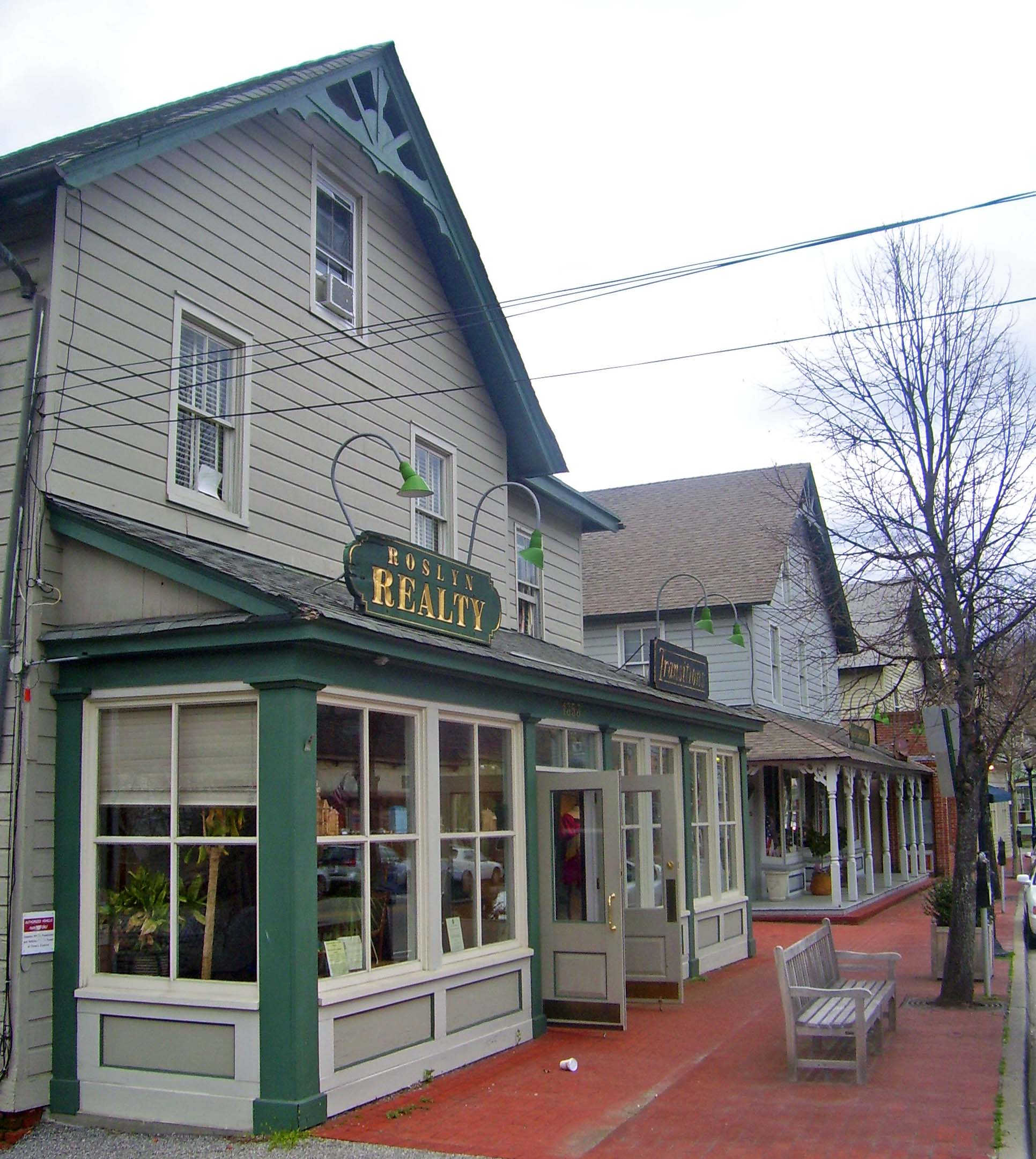
- Shops along Old Northern Boulevard, as seen in 2008.

- Location within New York Location within the United States
- Location: Roslyn, NY
- Nearest city: Glen Cove
- Coordinates: 40°48′03″N 73°38′49″W
- Area: 65 acres (26 ha)
- Built: 19th century
- Architectural style: Federal, Greek Revival
- MPS: Roslyn Village Multiple Resource Area
- NRHP reference No.: 86002650
- Added to NRHP: 1987

The Roslyn Village Historic District encompasses the center of that village in the U.S. state of New York. It includes within its boundaries the earlier Main Street Historic District, although that is considered a separate district by the National Park Service, which added the Roslyn Village district to the National Register of Historic Places in 1987.

== Overview ==
Distinct from the Main Street Historic District, the newer one includes more commercial property along Old Northern Boulevard, which makes a loop through downtown Roslyn off North Hempstead Turnpike (NY 25A), the main through road along Long Island's North Shore. Its contributing buildings, including several listed separately on the Register, are generally distributed over a wider range of architectural styles from the 19th and early 20th centuries.

== Geography ==
All but 25 of the district's 65 acres (6 of 26 ha) are accounted for by the Main Street District, which includes all property along Main Street between Glen Avenue and the intersection with East Broadway. The Roslyn Village district includes most of the remaining properties within the triangle created by Main, East Broadway and Old Northern, and some areas to the northeast along Glen Avenue, going up to Route 25A and the old Northern Mill Pond.

== History ==
Since the settlement's earliest days, in the mid-17th century, its development had clustered around Main Street. That growth took off in the early 19th century after independence, when most of the houses on Main were built. After the Civil War, demand still existed for houses in Roslyn, and buyers and builders turned to East Broadway, which shared the steep hillside and Roslyn Pond shoreline as Main, although in opposite directions.

As a result, the East Broadway houses skew to the late 19th century, with Victorian styles predominating. James K. Davis, who had earlier designed some of the Main Street houses, embraced the new Second Empire mansard roofed look in 1876 for his own house at 139 East Broadway. The Queen Anne style is exemplified by Evangeline Charman's 207 East Broadway home, built in 1895.

In the early 20th century there was still some room left to build on at the edges of the district, and in 1921 the Bryant Library on East Broadway gave the future district its major Colonial Revival building. By 1930 the East Broadway area was as developed as Main Street had been several decades before, and builders turned elsewhere, leaving the district to retain its own historic character.

As the Roslyn Landmark Society began to focus local attention on identifying and preserving the village's historic buildings in the 1960s, leading to the creation of the Main Street district, threatened older houses from elsewhere in the village and greater Roslyn area were moved to East Broadway to better protect them. An expanded historic inventory in 1979 led to a local Multiple Property Submission, which included the Roslyn Village district. The reviewers of the National Park Service initially balked at the idea of having two separate districts, suggesting instead that the state Office of Historic Preservation apply to expand the boundaries of the existing district. The state resubmitted the application, carefully explaining how Main Street constituted a visually and historically distinct collection of properties even within the proposed new district, and the Roslyn Village Historic District was added to the National Register.

== Preservation ==
Roslyn has added to its ordinances a provision protecting the buildings in both its historic districts. They are recognized in its zoning and any additions, demolition or alterations are subject to approval by the six-member Historic District Board. The Roslyn Landmark Society also holds a restrictive covenant on some of the properties.
