= County Route 7 (Nassau County, New York) =

County highway in Nassau County, New York

- CR 7, highlighted in red

Route information
- Maintained by NCDPW
- Length: 11.64 mi (18.73 km) CR 7A: 7.16 mi (11.52 km); CR 7B: 4.48 mi (7.21 km)
- Existed: 1959–present

Major junctions
- North end: Old Northern Boulevard (CR D71) and West Shore Road (CR 15) in Roslyn
- South end: Brooklyn Avenue (CR C23) and Broadway (CR C21) in Freeport

Location
- Country: United States
- State: New York
- County: Nassau

Highway system
- County routes in New York; County Routes in Nassau County

Nassau County Route 7 is a major, 11.64-mile (18.73 km) north-south county highway in Nassau County, on Long Island, New York, connecting the Incorporated Villages of Freeport and Roslyn. It consists of two discontiguous segments linked by one-block stretches of Front Street (NY 102; CR 106) and Peninsula Boulevard (CR 2) in Hempstead: County Route 7A (Roslyn–Hempstead) and County Route 7B (Hempstead–Freeport).

The unsigned county highway consists of North Main Street, Nassau Road, Greenwich Street, Washington Street, Washington Avenue, Roslyn Road, Main Street, and Old Northern Boulevard.

County Route 7, in its entirety, is owned by Nassau County and is maintained by the Nassau County Department of Public Works.

== Route description ==
=== CR 7A ===
County Route 7A begins at Peninsula Boulevard (CR 2) in the Village of Hempstead. From there, it continues north as Washington Street, intersecting Front Street (NY 102; CR 106) one block later. It then continues north, reaching Hempstead Turnpike (NY 24; CR 107) shortly thereafter, thence continuing north through the heart of Hempstead, soon intersecting Jackson Street and thence West Columbia Street, providing access to the Rosa Parks Hempstead Transit Center. From there, CR 7A continues north, intersecting several local streets before crossing into the Village of Garden City; Washington Street becomes Washington Avenue at this location. Immediately thereafter, it intersects Meadow Street – after which it continues north, intersecting several local streets before crossing the Long Island Rail Road's Garden City–Mitchel Field Secondary at-grade and intersecting Stewart Avenue in the heart of Garden City's downtown one block later. It then continues north along the west edge of the Mott Section of Garden City, intersecting several more local streets before intersecting Eleventh Street (CR C70). Now traveling along the east edge of Nassau County's government complex, CR 7A soon reaches South Road (CR E28), followed by Supreme Court Drive (CR E36), and thence Court House Drive (CR C50), before reaching an intersection with Old Country Road (CR 25) at the Garden City–Mineola line (which is also the Hempstead–North Hempstead line), adjacent to the Nassau County Courthouse. Upon crossing Old Country Road, CR 7A leaves Garden City and the Town of Hempstead, and enters the Village of Mineola and the Town of North Hempstead; Washington Avenue becomes Roslyn Road at this location.

Continuing north from Old Country Road through Mineola, CR 7A soon crosses underneath the Main Line of the Long Island Rail Road, soon rising back up to ground level and intersecting Second Street (CR E23). CR 7A then continues north-northeast, soon intersecting Westbury Avenue (CR E57) before eventually reaching Jerome Avenue a few blocks later. From there, Roslyn Road continues northeast, passing several local streets before reaching an intersection with Jericho Turnpike (NY 25). It then continues northeast and enters the Village of East Williston a few blocks later, at which point Roslyn Road gently curves towards the north, intersecting with several residential streets before reaching East Williston (Hillside) Avenue (NY 25B; CR 85) in the heart of the village. CR 7A then continues north, intersecting several more residential streets before entering Roslyn Heights at the site of the former crossing of the Long Island Motor Parkway. From there, CR 7A curves towards the northeast and soon reaches I.U. Willets Road. It then continues north as the main north–south thoroughfare through the Roslyn Country Club section of Roslyn Heights, before reaching Locust Lane and curving towards the northwest. Roslyn Road then continues through the area, soon reaching – and crossing over – the Northern State Parkway, with which it intersects via exit 29.

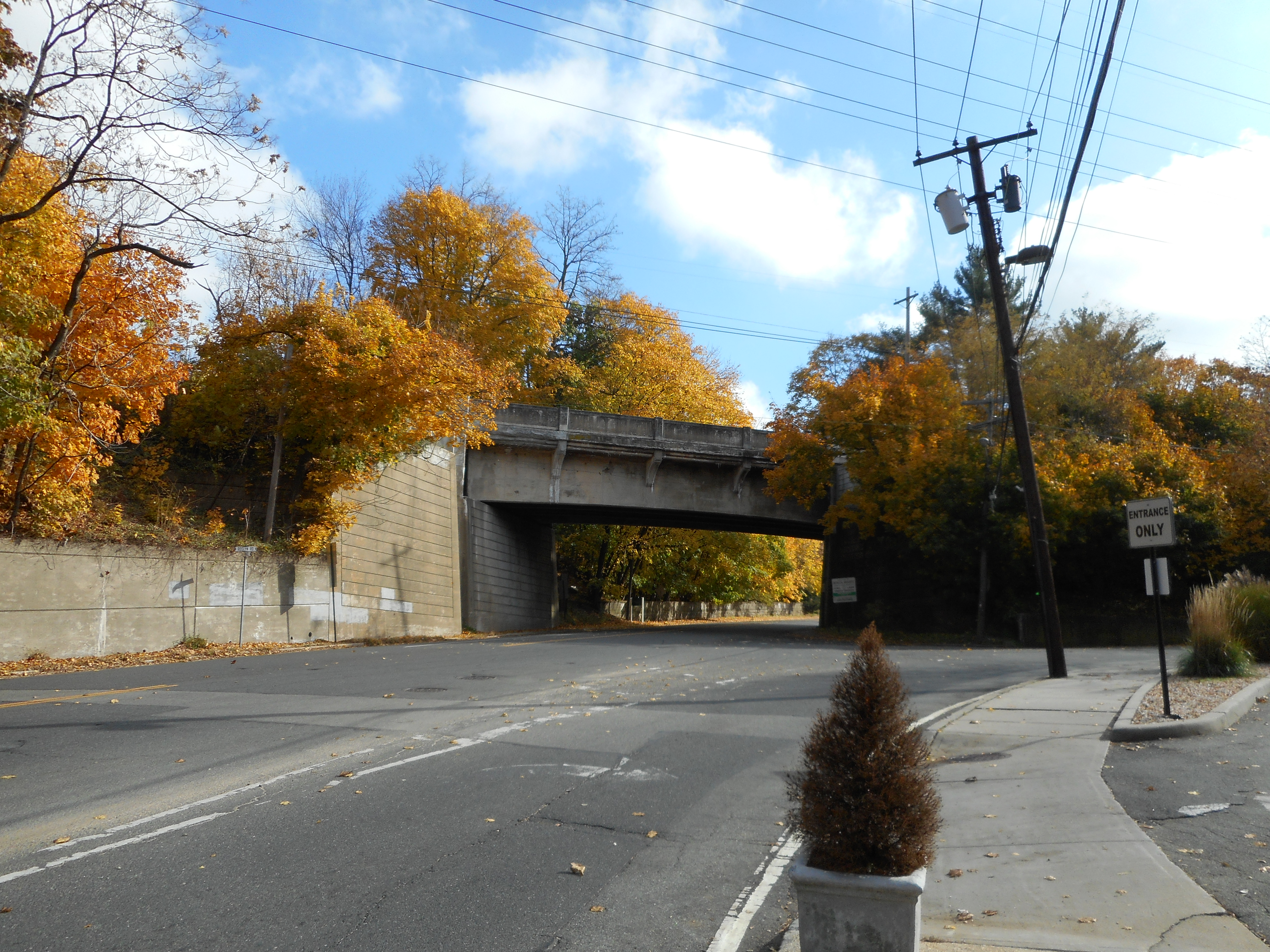
CR 7A, as seen passing underneath the LIRR's Oyster Bay Branch in Roslyn, looking southeast.

After crossing over the Northern State Parkway, CR 7A – now forming the Roslyn Heights–East Hills border – continues north and soon intersects Parkside Drive before intersecting the South Service Road (Powerhouse Road) of the Long Island Expressway (I-495). It then runs underneath I-495 and then immediately intersects the North Service Road (Powerhouse Road). From there, CR 7A meanders its way north along the Roslyn Heights–East Hills border, passing Russell Street and several other residential streets in Roslyn Heights before reaching Round Hill Road (CR E13). From there, it continues north, intersecting Lincoln Avenue one block north, in front of Roslyn High School – now fully in Roslyn Heights. Roslyn Road then curves towards the northwest, soon thereafter intersecting Harbor Hill Road (CR D06) at the Roslyn Heights–East Hills border. From there, CR 7A continues northwest, intersecting Locust Street one block later, at the tripoint between East Hills, Roslyn, and Roslyn Heights; CR 7A enters the Village of Roslyn at this location, and Roslyn Road's name changes to Main Street. CR 7A continues northwest from there along Main Street, crossing underneath the Long Island Rail Road's Oyster Bay Branch, and then intersecting Railroad Avenue immediately afterwards. It then continues northwest and intersects East Broadway (CR C65). From there, Main Street curves towards the north-northwest through the historic heart of Roslyn, eventually intersecting Paper Mill Road. From there, CR 7A continues north, eventually intersecting Tower Place and thence reaching Old Northern Boulevard (CR D71) in front of the village's historic clock tower. At this location, CR 7A veers onto Old Northern Boulevard, north to West Shore Road (CR 15); this marks the northern terminus of the CR 7A designation. Old Northern Boulevard continues west to Roslyn Estates & Flower Hill, and the CR 15 designation continues north to Port Washington along West Shore Road & Beacon Hill Road.

=== CR 7B ===
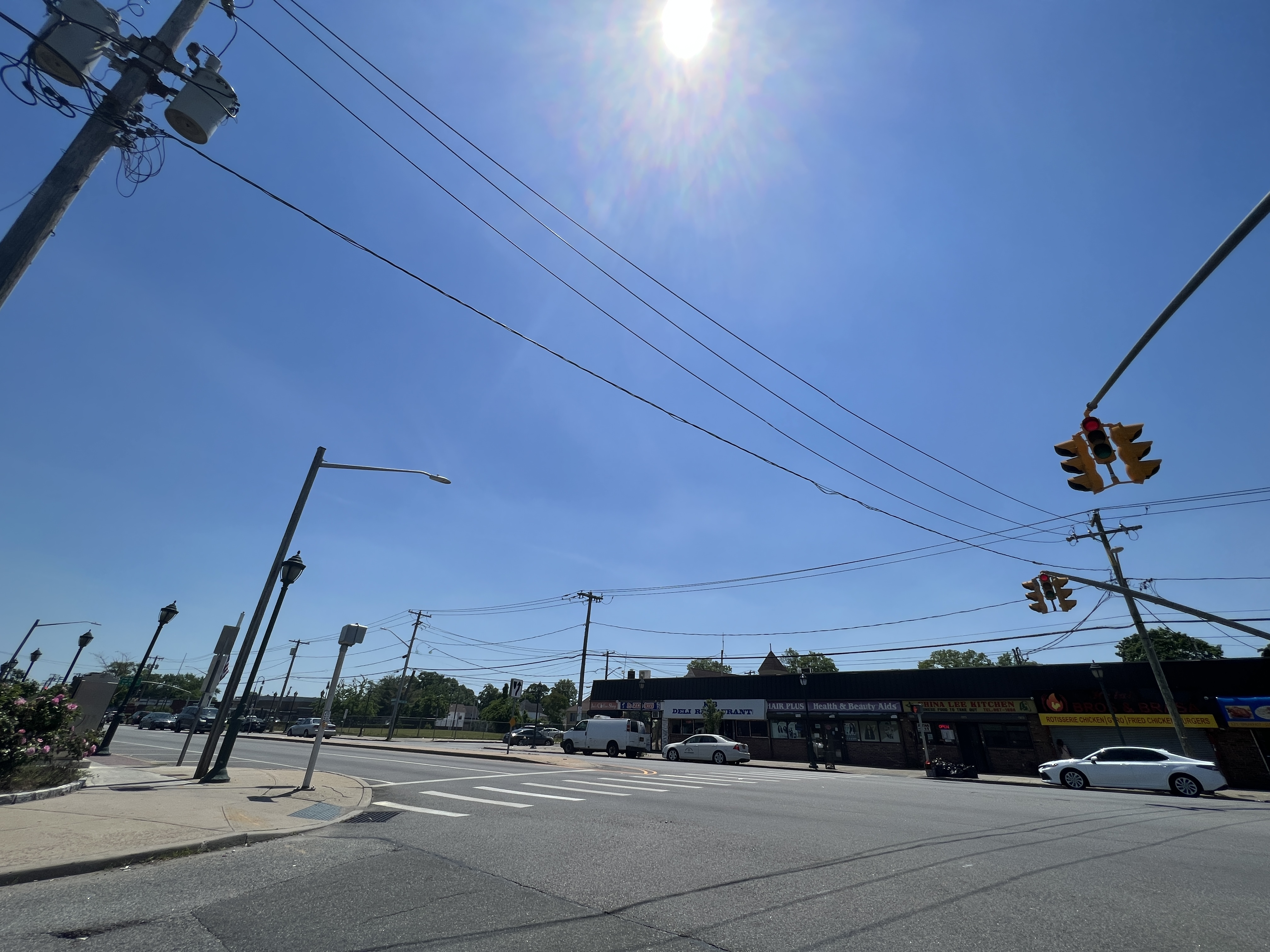
Nassau Road in Roosevelt in 2022.

County Route 7B begins at Brooklyn Avenue (CR C23) and Broadway (CR C21) in the Village of Freeport, at the village's Long Island Rail Road station. From there, it travels north as North Main Street, eventually reaching West and East Seaman Avenues (CR E21). It then continues north through the village and intersecting several local streets, soon intersecting Pleasant Avenue, where it enters Roosevelt. CR 7B then continues north, intersecting with West Centennial Avenue (CR C34) shortly thereafter – and thence reaching a junction with Babylon Turnpike (CR D11). Now running along Nassau Road, CR 7B veers to the north-northwest and passes through the heart of Roosevelt, intersecting several local streets, and it eventually crossing over the Southern State Parkway, with which it interchanges via exit 21. Once Nassau Road crosses over the Southern State Parkway, it enters Uniondale and soon thereafter reaches an intersection with Brookside Avenue (CR C23) and Uniondale Avenue (CR 188). From there, CR 7 continues northwest, eventually reaching Argyle and Harold Avenues, where it enters the Village of Hempstead and becomes Greenwich Street. It continues northwest from there, eventually passing Kennedy Park and then intersecting with Henry Street (CR D13), before shortly thereafter reaching an intersection with Baldwin Road (CR 55), Jerusalem Avenue (CR 105), and Marvin Street. The road then curves back to the north-northwest, eventually intersecting Peninsula Boulevard (CR 2) before continuing north and reaching Front Street (NY 102; CR 106) – CR 7B's northern terminus – one block later.

North of the intersection with Front Street, Greenwich Street continues north as Main Street – a village-maintained road. South of the Freeport LIRR station, North Main Street continues south as South Main Street, which is owned and maintained by the Village of Freeport.

== History ==
Former shield for CR 7.

Like all of the other county routes in Nassau County, CR 7 became unsigned in the 1970s, when Nassau County officials opted to remove the signs as opposed to allocating the funds for replacing them with new ones that met the latest federal design standards and requirements, as per the federal government's Manual on Uniform Traffic Control Devices. When Nassau County first signed its highways in 1959, CR 7 continued north and east from Roslyn to Glen Cove – and further south from its current terminus in Freeport, through that village, to the water. Following the removal of the signs and Nassau County renumbering its routes, CR 7 was split into CR 7A and CR 7B, and was truncated on both ends to its current, respective termini.

In 2008, the former Roslyn Road's former grade crossing with the Long Island Rail Road's Main Line was eliminated. The grade crossing elimination project saw the road be shifted just west of the former alignment in the area, and be depressed to pass underneath the tracks.

=== Landmarks ===
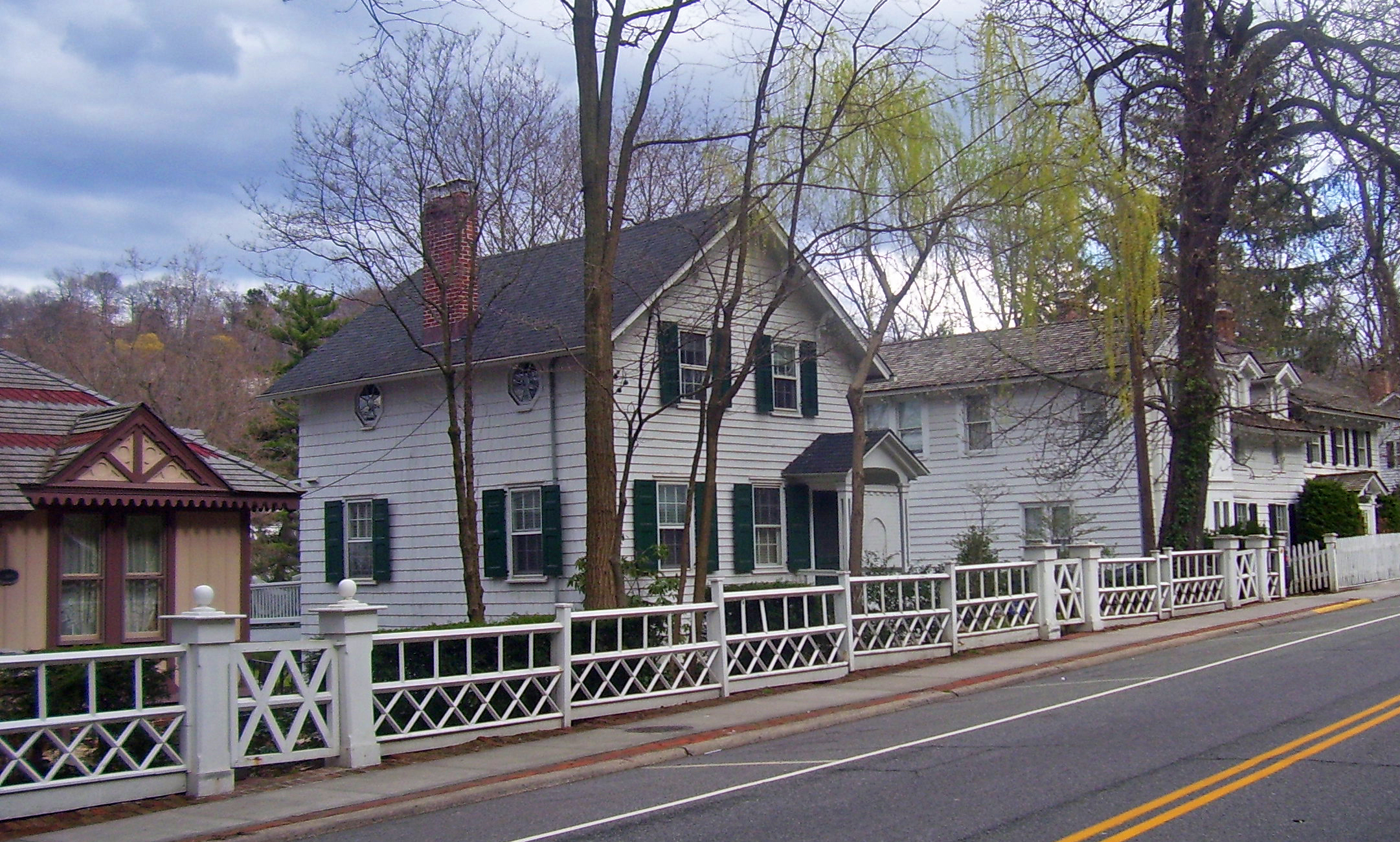
Homes in the Main Street Historic District, along Main Street in Roslyn.

Many landmarks exist along CR 7, including the Roslyn House in Roslyn Heights, the Ellen E. Ward Memorial Clock Tower in Roslyn, and the Mackay Estate Gate Lodge in East Hills – all of which are listed on the National Register of Historic Places. Furthermore, a large portion of the route within Roslyn travels through the Main Street Historic District.

== Major intersections ==
Location	mi	km	Destinations	Notes
Freeport	0.00	0.00	Brooklyn Avenue (CR C23); Broadway (CR C21)	Southern terminus of CR 7B; access to the Freeport LIRR station
Freeport	0.84	1.35	West / East Seaman Avenue (CR E21)	
Freeport–Roosevelt line	1.43	2.30	Pleasant Avenue	Road name changes from North Main Street to Nassau Road
Roosevelt	1.78	2.86	Babylon Turnpike (CR D11)	
Roosevelt	2.22	3.57	East / West Raymond Avenue	
Roosevelt–Uniondale line	2.41	3.88	Southern State Parkway – New York, East Islip	Exit 21 on the Southern State Parkway
Uniondale	2.57	4.14	Brookside Avenue (CR 55); Uniondale Avenue (CR 188)	
Hempstead Village–Uniondale line	2.52	4.06	Harold Avenue; Argyle Avenue	Road name changes from Nassau Road to Greenwich Street
Hempstead Village	3.98	6.41	Baldwin Road (CR 55); Jerusalem Avenue (CR 105)	
Hempstead Village	4.37	7.03	Peninsula Boulevard (CR 2)	
Hempstead Village	4.48	7.21	NY 102 (Front Street) – Hempstead Village, East Meadow	At-grade intersection; northern terminus of CR 7B
Hempstead Village	Gap in route; connection made between CR 7B and CR 7A via one block of NY 102 or via one block of CR 2			
Hempstead Village	0.00	0.00	Peninsula Boulevard (CR 2)	Southern terminus of CR 7A designation
Hempstead Village	0.09	0.14	NY 102 (Front Street) – Hempstead Village, East Meadow	At-grade intersection
Hempstead Village	0.25	0.40	NY 24 (Hempstead Turnpike) – New York, East Farmingdale	At-grade intersection
Hempstead Village	0.39	0.63	Jackson Street	
Hempstead Village	0.47	0.76	West Columbia Street	Access to Rosa Parks Hempstead Transit Center, via West Columbia Street
Garden City	0.93	1.50	Meadow Street	Road name changes from Washington Street to Washington Avenue
Garden City	1.6	2.6	Stewart Avenue	
Garden City–Mineola line	2.46	3.96	Old Country Road (CR 25)	Road name changes from Washington Avenue to Roslyn Road
Mineola	2.69	4.33	Second Street (CR E23)	
Mineola	2.9	4.7	Westbury Avenue (CR E57)	
Mineola	3.26	5.25	NY 25 (Jericho Turnpike) – New York, Orient Point	At-grade intersection
East Williston	3.74	6.02	NY 25B (East Williston Avenue) – New York, Westbury	At-grade intersection
Roslyn Heights	4.7	7.6	I.U. Willets Road	
Roslyn Heights	5.03	8.10	Locust Lane	
Roslyn Heights–East Hills line	5.35	8.61	Northern State Parkway – New York, Hauppauge	Exit 29 on the Northern State Parkway
Roslyn Heights–East Hills line	5.61	9.03	South Service Road (Powerhouse Road)	Eastbound traffic only; access to I-495 at exit 39, via South Service Road
Roslyn Heights–East Hills line	5.66	9.11	North Service Road (Powerhouse Road)	Westbound traffic only; access to I-495 at exit 37, via North Service Road
Roslyn Heights–East Hills line	6.09	9.80	Round Hill Road (CR E13)	
Roslyn Heights	6.13	9.87	Lincoln Avenue	
Roslyn Heights–East Hills line	6.25	10.06	Harbor Hill Road (CR D06)	
Roslyn–Roslyn Heights– East Hills tripoint	6.3	10.1	Locust Street	Road name changes from Roslyn Road to Main Street
Roslyn	6.49	10.44	East Broadway (CR E65)	East Broadway is one-way southbound; no access from Main Street
Roslyn	6.92	11.14	Old Northern Boulevard (CR D71)	CR 7 veers onto Old Northern Boulevard
Roslyn	7.16	11.52	West Shore Road (CR 15)	Northern terminus of CR 7A; Old Northern Boulevard continues west as CR D71
1.000 mi = 1.609 km; 1.000 km = 0.621 mi: Incomplete access; Route transition

== See also ==
- List of county routes in Nassau County, New York
- Freeport–Roslyn Expressway
