= List of Town of North Hempstead Designated Landmarks =

"Town of North Hempstead Designated Landmark" is a designation given for buildings and other historic sites by (and within) the Town of North Hempstead, in Nassau County, New York, United States.

== Overview ==
Listed sites are selected after meeting a combination of criteria, including historical, economic, architectural, artistic, cultural, and social values. Once a site is designated as a landmark, it is subject to the Town of North Hempstead Landmarks Ordinance (Chapter 27 of the North Hempstead Town Code), which requires that any alterations beyond routine maintenance, up to and including demolition, must have their permit reviewed by the Town of North Hempstead Historic Landmarks Preservation Commission. Many Town of North Hempstead Designated Landmarks also are listed on the National Register of Historic Places, providing federal tax support for preservation.

== Listings town-wide ==
Below is a list of the 18 current landmarks & historic districts in the Town of North Hempstead. Dates of landmark designation and street addresses are as given by the Town of North Hempstead Historic Landmarks Preservation Commission.

	Landmark name	Image	Date designated	Location	City or Town	Summary
1	Horatio Gates Onderdonk House		July 23, 1985	1471 Northern Boulevard 40°47′38″N 73°41′33″W	Strathmore (Manhasset)	
2	Monfort Cemetery		July 23, 1985	Main Street 40°49′52″N 73°40′57″W	Port Washington	
3	Thomas Dodge Homestead		July 23, 1985	58 Harbor Road 40°50′20″N 73°41′51″W	Port Washington	
4	Main Street School		July 23, 1985	232 Main Street 40°49′50″N 73°41′48″W	Port Washington	
5	East Gate Toll House		June 24, 1986	Northern Boulevard 40°48′31″N 73°37′56″W	Greenvale	Located within the Roslyn Cemetery; also known as "Toll Gate House" & "Roslyn East Gate Toll House"
6	Denton House		January 5, 1988	2045 Jericho Turnpike	New Hyde Park	
7	Roslyn House		March 7, 1989	69 Roslyn Road 40°47′31″N 73°38′28″W	Roslyn Heights	
8	Roslyn Cemetery		August 11, 1992	Northern Boulevard 40°48′31″N 73°37′56″W	Greenvale	
9	Port Washington Heights Historic District		January 11, 1994	Roughly bounded by North Plandome Road, Mitchell Road, Bayview Avenue, and Davis Road	Port Washington	Includes 44 properties, as of June 2015
10	A.M.E. Zion Church & Cemetery		December 13, 1994	519 Community Drive 40°46′27″N 73°42′14″W	Manhasset	Also known as the Lakeville A.M.E. Zionist Church & Cemetery; part of the NRHP-listed Valley Road Historic District
11	Dutch Homestead		June 27, 1995	10 Old Homestead Way	Herricks	Also known as "Sackler House"
12	Roslyn Heights Historic District		January 5, 1999	Roughly bounded by Mineola Avenue, Carlyle Place, Forest Street, and Warner Avenue	Roslyn Heights	Includes 77 properties, as of June 2015; district boundaries expanded on 7/19/2005 and 1/26/2010
13	John L. Miller Residence		December 11, 2001	4 Warwick Road	Great Neck Gardens	
14	Schumacher House		March 15, 2005	Clinton G. Martin Park 40°45′33″N 73°41′15″W	Manhasset Hills	Also known as Cornell-Van Nostrand House; located within Clinton G. Martin Park
15	Searing House		May 24, 2005	39 Sunset Road (rear address); 160 I.U. Willets Road (front address)	Searingtown	Location of the first meeting of the North Hempstead Town Council
16	Shelter Rock		March 27, 2007	Shelter Rock Road	Manhasset	
17	Benjamin Mott Cemetery		September 14, 2010	North of Scudders Lane, between West & Maple Streets	Glenwood Landing	
18	Old Courthouse Road Bridge		June 2, 2015	Old Courthouse Road	Manhasset Hills	Bridge crosses the former Long Island Motor Parkway

== Key ==
^{∞}	North Hempstead town landmark
^{*}	Also listed on National Register of Historic Places

== See also ==
- New York State Historic Markers, Nassau County, Town of North Hempstead
- National Register of Historic Places listings in Nassau County, New York
- New York State Register of Historic Places
