= Clinton G. Martin Park =

Park within the Town of North Hempstead, in Nassau County, New York, United States

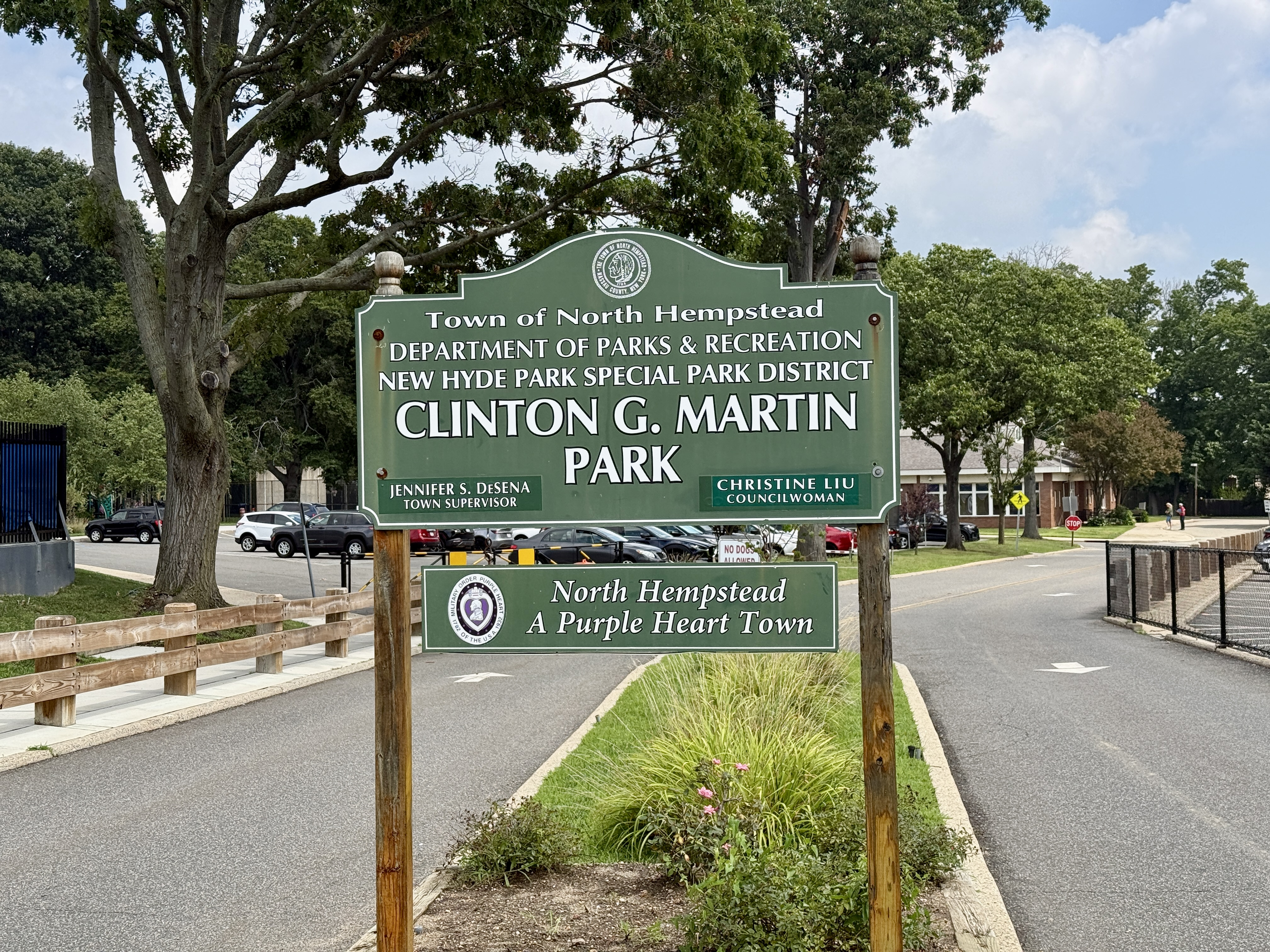
- The entrance to Clinton G. Martin Park in 2026
- Interactive map of Clinton G. Martin Park
- Type: Active
- Location: Manhasset Hills, New York
- Coordinates: 40°45′23″N 73°41′13″W
- Established: 1963
- Owner: Town of North Hempstead
- Operator: New Hyde Park Special Park District
- Paths: Yes
- Parking: Yes
- Website: Clinton G. Martin Park – Town of North Hempstead

Clinton G. Martin Park (also known as the Clinton G. Martin Pool) is a major park located within Manhasset Hills in the Town of North Hempstead, in Nassau County, New York, United States.

The park, owned by the Town of North Hempstead, is operated by the town-run New Hyde Park Special Park District and is exclusively open to residents of said district and their guests.

== Description ==
Clinton G. Martin Park contains an outdoor swimming pool complex with a bathhouse and cafe, a community center, a playground, picnic areas, and walking paths – in addition to basketball courts, tennis courts, and pickleball courts.

The park also features the Cornell-Van Nostrand House (also known as the Schumacher House) — a historic building that is listed on the town, state, and national landmark registries as a designated landmark.

== History ==
The land comprising what is now Clinton G. Martin Park had been owned by Fred Schumacher, Jr., a local farmer.

In 1952, Schumacher had moved the Cornell-Van Nostrand House (also known as the Schumacher House) to its current location within what is now the park by Schumacher, where it continues to stand as of 2026 as a designated historical landmark.

In September 1962, after unsuccessfully attempting to redevelop the property with business and residential homes, Schumacher sold the land to the Town of North Hempstead for the establishment of a park with provisions for a pool within it. With both the park and pool having received widespread public support, the town established the New Hyde Park Special Park District the following month, and a construction firm was retained to construct the park in February 1963.

The park and pool opened in 1963.

During the 1980s, the pool at the park underwent its first major renovation.

In 2017, the Town of Hempstead approved a $21 million pool renovation and modernization project, which also saw the creation of additional swimming facilities – namely, a splash pool and water slide. New canopies were added, seating areas were rebuilt, and the locker rooms were renovated. The ribbon-cutting ceremony for the rebuilt and expanded pool facility occurred at 11 AM on June 28, 2018.

In 2026, it was announced by Supervisor Jennifer DeSena that two of the tennis courts at the park would be converted into pickleball courts. As part of the same project, the pool liner in the park's kiddie pool, which has been defective and leaking since installation and patched yearly at an average cost of $17,000, will be replaced.

=== Etymology ===
Clinton G. Martin Park – like the pool complex within it – is named in honor of the late Clinton G. Martin, the former Town Supervisor of the Town of North Hempstead and a resident of nearby North New Hyde Park. The North Hempstead Town Council had voted to name the pool complex after – and as a memorial to – Martin on May 24, 1966; Martin had died suddenly one week earlier after suffering a heart attack in his home on Iris Lane within North New Hyde Park, at the age of 54.

== New Hyde Park Special Park District ==
New Hyde Park Special Park District

Park District overview
- Formed: October 1962
- Jurisdiction: Portions of southwestern North Hempstead, New York
- Parent agency: Town of North Hempstead

The New Hyde Park Special Park District (also known as the New Hyde Park Park District and the Clinton G. Martin Park District) is a special park district serving the portions of the Greater New Hyde Park area within the Town of North Hempstead, in Nassau County, New York, United States. It is operated by – and as part of – the Town of North Hempstead.

Established in October 1962 by the Town of North Hempstead, the New Hyde Park Special Park District is responsible for the operation, management, and improvement of Clinton G. Martin Park in Manhasset Hills – the sole facility operated by the district.

=== District boundaries ===
The boundaries of the New Hyde Park Special Park District include all of the unincorporated hamlets of Floral Park Centre, Garden City Park, Herricks, Hillside Manor, and Lakeville Estates – along with all of the hamlet of North New Hyde Park south of Union Turnpike, all of the hamlet of Manhasset Hills east of New Hyde Park Road, and the portions of the hamlet of Searingtown south of I.U. Willets Road and west of Searingtown Road. The district's boundaries also include all of the Incorporated Village of New Hyde Park within the Town of North Hempstead, as well as the portion of the Incorporated Village of North Hills consisting of The Links housing development and North Hills Village Hall. Furthermore, small portions of the extreme western ends of the Incorporated Village of Williston Park and the hamlet of Albertson are also located within the easternmost extremes of the district's boundaries.

== See also ==
- Merriman Park (Port Washington, New York)
- Cornell-Van Nostrand House
