= Americana Manhasset =

Shopping mall in Manhasset, New York

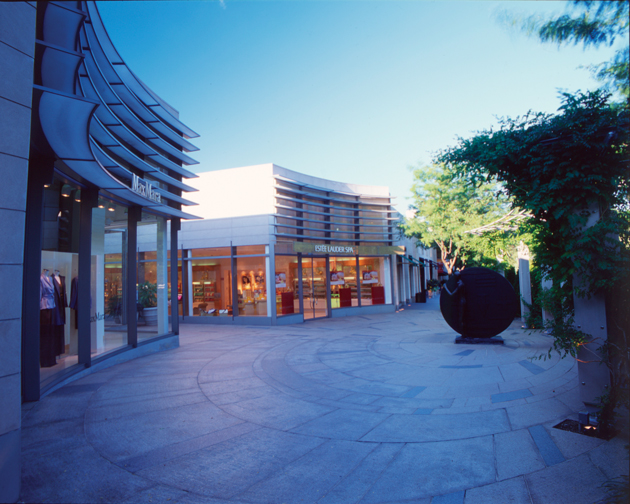
- The focal plaza of the Americana Manhasset, a center for luxury retail.
- Location: Strathmore, Manhasset, New York
- Coordinates: 40°47′45″N 73°40′17″W
- Address: 2060 Northern Boulevard; Manhasset, NY 11030
- Opened: 1956
- Developer: Gerace & Castagna, Inc. (now Castagna Realty)
- Manager: Castagna Realty
- Owner: Castagna Realty
- Architect: Peter Marino
- Num. of stores: 66
- Floors: 1
- Parking: Lighted lot; free
- Public transit: Nassau Inter-County Express: n20H, n21, n23
- Website: www.americanamanhasset.com

Americana Manhasset (also known as Americana Mall, Americana Center, or simply as The Americana) is an upscale, open-air shopping center located in the Strathmore area of Manhasset, in Nassau County, on Long Island, in New York, United States. At roughly 220,000 square feet (20,000 m^{2}) in area and approximately 1,500 feet (460 m) in length, it is located along – and anchors – a stretch of Northern Boulevard commonly referred to as the "Miracle Mile" of Manhasset.

The center features numerous upscale retail brands, including Bottega Veneta, Cartier, Celine, Chanel, Dior, Fendi, Gucci, Hermès, Louis Vuitton, MaxMara, Prada, RH, Tiffany & Co., and Versace.

== History ==
=== Early years ===
The land on which Americana Manhasset now sits was purchased in the 1950s by Gerace & Castagna, Incorporated – now Castagna Realty – which was founded in 1922 by Ferdinand Castagna as a firm specializing in masonry contracting. The Shopping Center opened on the site in 1956, known at the time as Fifth Avenue of Long Island. At the time of its opening, Fifth Avenue of Long Island included a movie theater, a drugstore, a supermarket, and other businesses – many of which were small family owned retailers. Fifth Avenue of Long Island would be renamed "Americana Manhasset" by Castagna shortly thereafter. It was constructed during a period of significant population explosion on Long Island, and when many of the large, Gold Coast-era estates in the area were giving way to upscale, suburban housing developments.

The shopping center was also built adjacent – and attached – to New York City-based department store B. Altman and Company's Manhasset branch, which opened in 1947 as one of the company's first branch store locations.

In 1971, B. Altman leased retail space for its expansion becoming one of Americana Manhasset's major anchor tenants, and the center shortly thereafter started its transformation into a lifestyle- and fashion-oriented shopping mall. Two years later, in 1973, England-based clothier Jaeger opened a store at the center; this was the first time that a luxury-brand retailer opened a retail store at the Americana Manhasset, and numerous other luxury- and name-brand retailers subsequently opened up locations at the mall in the years following.

=== Modern-day Americana: 1990s – present ===
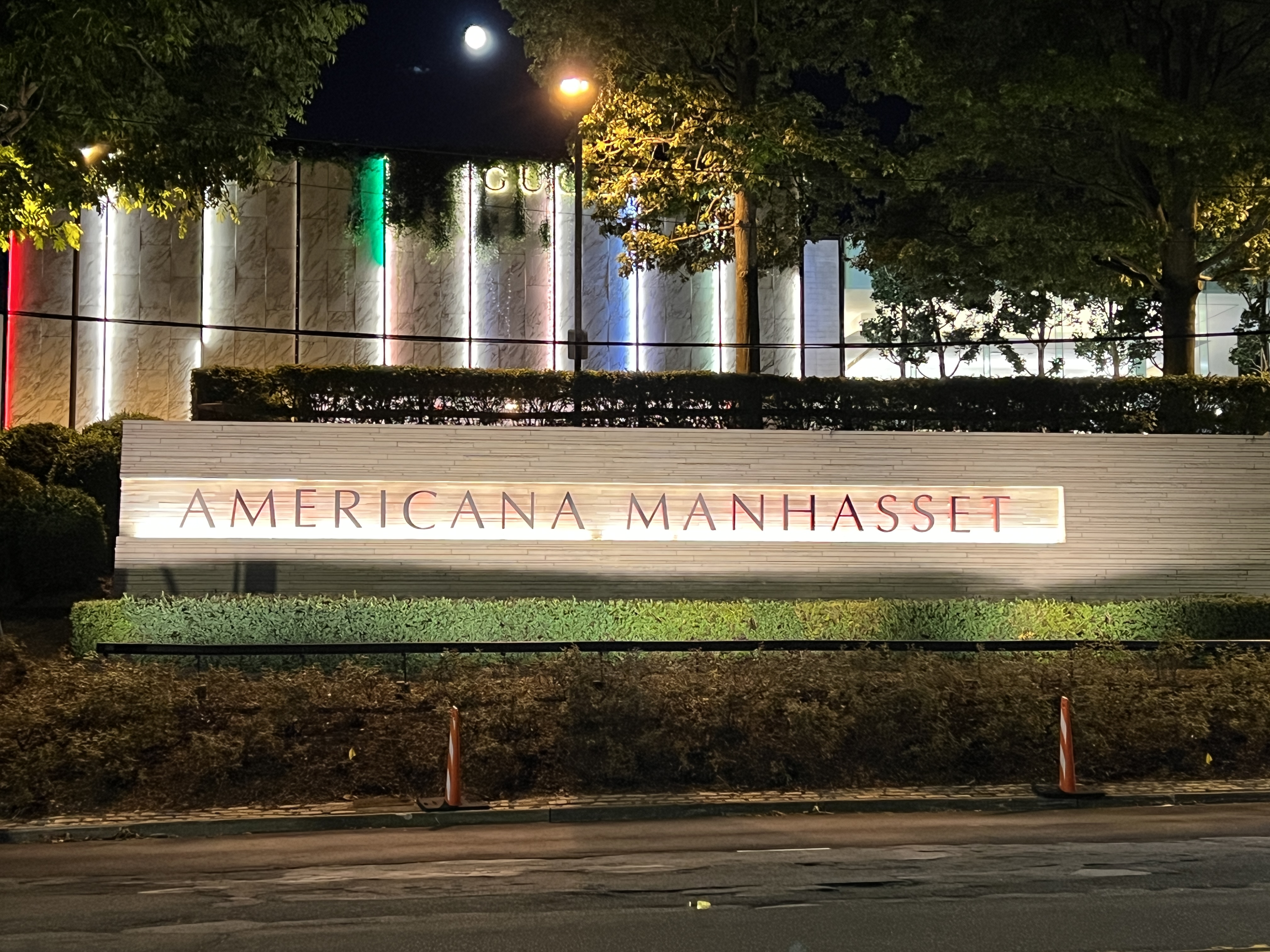
The main sign in front of the mall in 2023

In the mid-1980s, the Americana Manhasset underwent an extensive transformation and overhaul. Second generation Frank Castagna retained architect Peter Marino to serve as the center's master architect; Marino was subsequently tasked with the redesign of the shopping center in the 1990s. As part of the project, Americana's exteriors were altered to make the structures more luxurious, with storefront designs similar to those found along Madison Avenue or Rodeo Drive. This included the extensive utilization of limestone for the building façades. The walkways at the shopping center were redesigned in granite, to be surrounded by gardens; the walkways and the landscaping surrounding them were designed by Washington, D.C.-based landscape architects Oheme, van Sweden & Associates in 1986.

In 1989, the B. Altman department store closed, following the bankruptcy of the company. Following its closure, the former store was sold, and it was rebuilt in the 1990s as a new, separately-owned shopping center located adjacent – and attached – to the Americana Manhasset, known as The Gate at Manhasset.

In addition to B. Altman, other major stores located at Americana Manhasset in the past include J.J. Newberry, Escada, Yves St. Laurent, Charles Jourdan, Barneys, and Waldbaum's.

In the early 1990s, Waldbaum's at the eastern end of Americana Manhasset closed, upon the end of its lease. This roughly 29,000-square-foot (2,700 m^{2}) space formerly occupied by the supermarket was subsequently subdivided into nine smaller retail spaces. This new retail space was completed and officially opened in 2003, and it contains numerous stores – including Dior, Louis Vuitton, and Gucci.

In 2019, the Americana Manhasset was connected to the Great Neck Water Pollution Control District's sanitary sewer system, eliminating the mall's reliance on septic systems on-site. The project, which was fully funded by Castagna Realty, saw the eastward extension of an existing district sewer force main underneath Northern Boulevard by approximately 0.8 miles (1.3 km). At the eastern end of the extended main on Northern Boulevard in front of the Americana Manhasset, a new, smaller sanitary sewer line was constructed, leading from the main under Northern Boulevard; the line travels south and east from the main, underneath the mall's parking lot, extending south and east towards the eastern end of its parking lot, where it terminates.

In 2023, the first Ralph's Coffee on Long Island opened at the Americana Manhasset, located inside the Ralph Lauren.

== Tenants and services ==
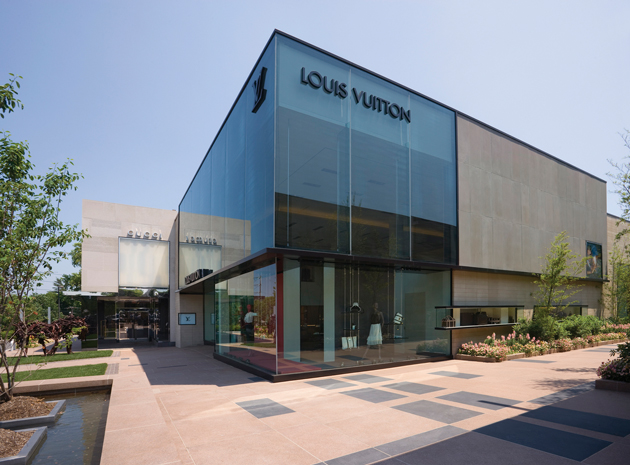
Stores at the Americana Manhasset in 2009

As of 2026, the Americana Manhasset includes approximately 60 retail brands. Some of the retailers include Bluemercury, Bottega Veneta, Brooks Brothers, Brunello Cucinelli, Burberry, Cartier, Chanel, David Yurman, Dior, Ermenegildo Zegna, Fendi, Gucci, Hermès, Hugo Boss, Jimmy Choo, Kiton, Kith, Louis Vuitton, MaxMara, Saint Laurent, Salvatore Ferragamo, Todd Snyder, Tesla, Versace, Van Cleef & Arpels, Valentino, and Vilebrequin, among others.

A large number of the retail tenants are luxury brands, and the center offers complimentary personal shoppers and a concierge.

As of 2023, the center also contains two restaurants, and some stores – including Hirshleifers and Ralph Lauren – feature in-store dining options of their own.

== Transportation ==
Americana Manhasset is served by the following bus routes – all of which are operated by Nassau Inter-County Express (NICE):

- n20H (Great Neck LIRR – Hicksville LIRR)
- n20X (Flushing – Roslyn Clock Tower)
- n21 (Great Neck LIRR – Glen Cove)
- n23 (Mineola Intermodal Center – Manorhaven)

All four bus routes serve the mall with stops along Northern Boulevard.

== In popular culture ==
The Americana Manhasset is referenced in the book Manhasset Stories, by Suzanne McLain Rosenwasser.

== See also ==
- Wheatley Plaza – Another Castagna-owned Shopping Center in North Hempstead, located in nearby Greenvale.
