= Shelter Rock (Manhasset, New York) =

Landmarked rock shelter in Nassau County, New York

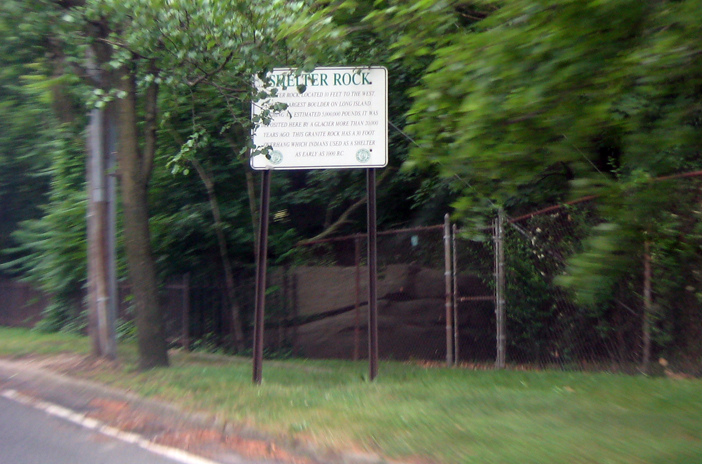
- The historic marker for Shelter Rock along Shelter Rock Road, adjacent to the rock

- Location on Long Island Location within the state of New York
- 40°47′21.52″N 73°41′28.1″W
- Location: Shelter Rock Road, Manhasset, New York

History
- Formed: ~ 11,000 – 20,000 years before present

Site notes
- Height: 55 ft (17 m)

Shelter Rock is a landmarked rock shelter of granite in Manhasset, New York, United States, 10 feet (3 m) from Shelter Rock Road, near the border with the Incorporated Village of North Hills.

== Description ==
The rock is a glacial erratic estimated to weigh 1,800 short tons (1,600 t) and has a 30-foot (9.1 m) overhang. It is 55 feet (17 m) high and 35 feet (11 m) wide. It was deposited by glacial action between 20,000 and 11,000 years ago. Members of the Matinecock had a settlement nearby and a number of legends about the rock arose among both the Native Americans and the European colonists. Native Americans used the rock as shelter from the elements, possibly as early as 1000 B.C.

The boulder is located on Greentree, a private estate once owned by the Whitney family. The top of the boulder is just visible from Shelter Rock Road, more so in the colder parts of the year when the vegetation recedes. While it is not publicly accessible, the Greentree Foundation does arrange special tours for scouts, school and other small groups from time to time.

On March 27, 2007, Shelter Rock was declared a Town of North Hempstead Designated Landmark by the Town of North Hempstead Historic Landmarks Preservation Commission.

== See also ==
- List of individual rocks
- List of Town of North Hempstead Designated Landmarks
