= Roslyn Cemetery =

Historic cemetery in New York, United States

- U.S. National Register of Historic Places
- New York State Register of Historic Places
- Town of North Hempstead Designated Landmark
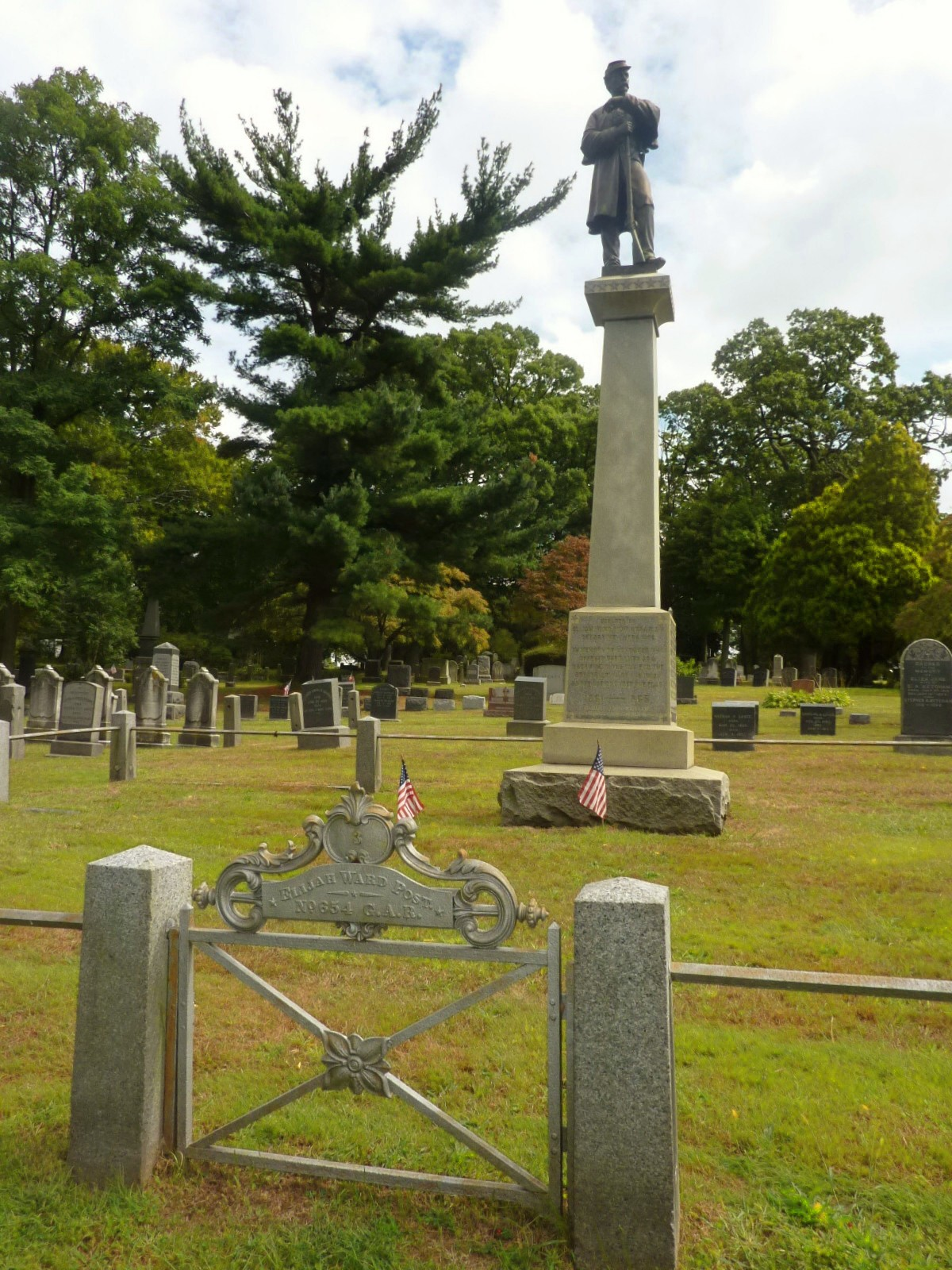
- The grounds of the Roslyn Cemetery, which despite the name is actually in nearby Greenvale, New York.

- Location within Long Island Location within New York Location within the United States
- Interactive map showing the location for Roslyn Cemetery
- Location: Northern Boulevard, W of jct. with Glen Cove Road, Roslyn, New York
- Coordinates: 40°48′33″N 73°37′56″W
- Area: 13 acres (5.3 ha)
- Built: 1908
- NRHP reference No.: 91001534

Significant dates
- Added to NRHP: October 28, 1991
- Designated NYSRHP: August 22, 1991
- Designated TNHDL: August 11, 1992

The Roslyn Cemetery is a historic cemetery located on Northern Boulevard (NY 25A) in Greenvale, in Nassau County, New York, United States. It is owned by the Roslyn Presbyterian Church which is located within the Village of Roslyn.

== Description ==
The Roslyn Cemetery is a product of the "Rural Cemetery Act" of which one of the many intents was to move burial grounds away from the local church and community as well as to design the grounds in a park like setting. This is clearly evident in the "Roslyn Cemetery" which is more like a botanical garden than a cemetery. Interments began in the 19th century and it continues to accept burials today. The cemetery has many notable figures as well as a section dedicated to fallen Civil War soldiers.

The "East Gate Toll House" which sits on the south east side of the "Roslyn Cemetery" and is clearly seen from Northern Blvd. (Route 25A) is the last remaining toll house that served the North Hempstead Turnpike. It was built around 1864 and is frequently but incorrectly referred to as being a toll house for the Vanderbilt Motor Parkway which ran considerably south of this location. Over the years the toll road had ceased operation and the main road was moved south of the toll house. The "Roslyn Cemetery" eventually surrounded the property. This structure sat unoccupied for many years and served little more than a shed for cemetery work tools. In the 1980s it was restored. It serves as a private residence and, like the surrounding cemetery, is listed on the National Register of Historic Places and the New York State Register of Historic Places – as well as being a Town of North Hempstead Designated Landmark.

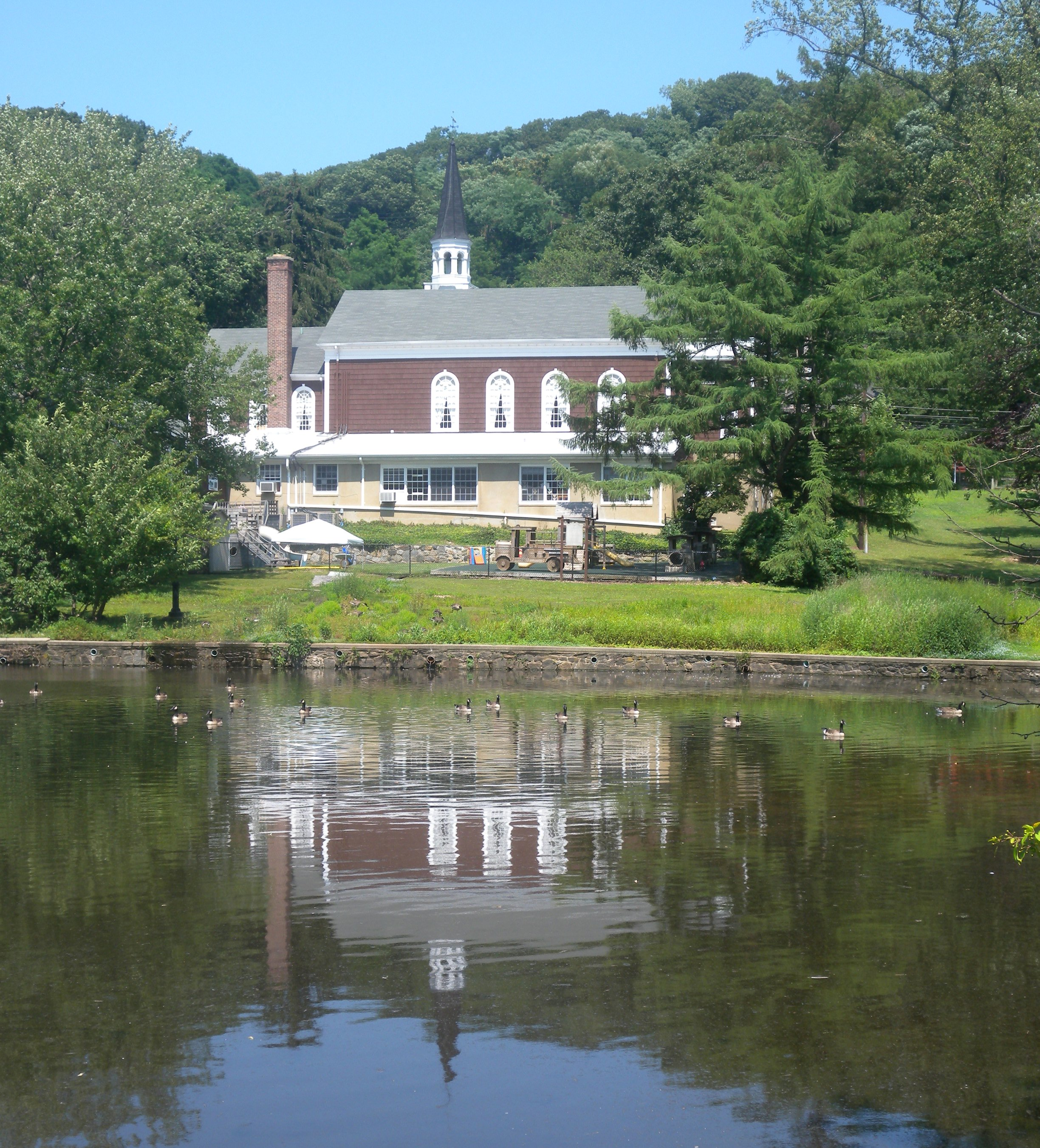
Roslyn Presbyterian Church

== Notable interments ==
- William Cullen Bryant, poet and journalist, lived in Roslyn
- Frances Hodgson Burnett, author of The Secret Garden, A Little Princess and Little Lord Fauntleroy
- Christopher Morley, poet and journalist, lived in Roslyn
- Stephen Taber, a United States Congressman from New York from 1865–1869
- William Tavoulareas, President of Mobil Corporation 1969–1984 lived in Sands Pt.

== See also ==
- Flower Hill Cemetery (Flower Hill, New York)
- Monfort Cemetery
