= Manhasset Hills, New York =

Manhasset Hills, New York Plattsdale, New York
- Hamlet and census-designated place
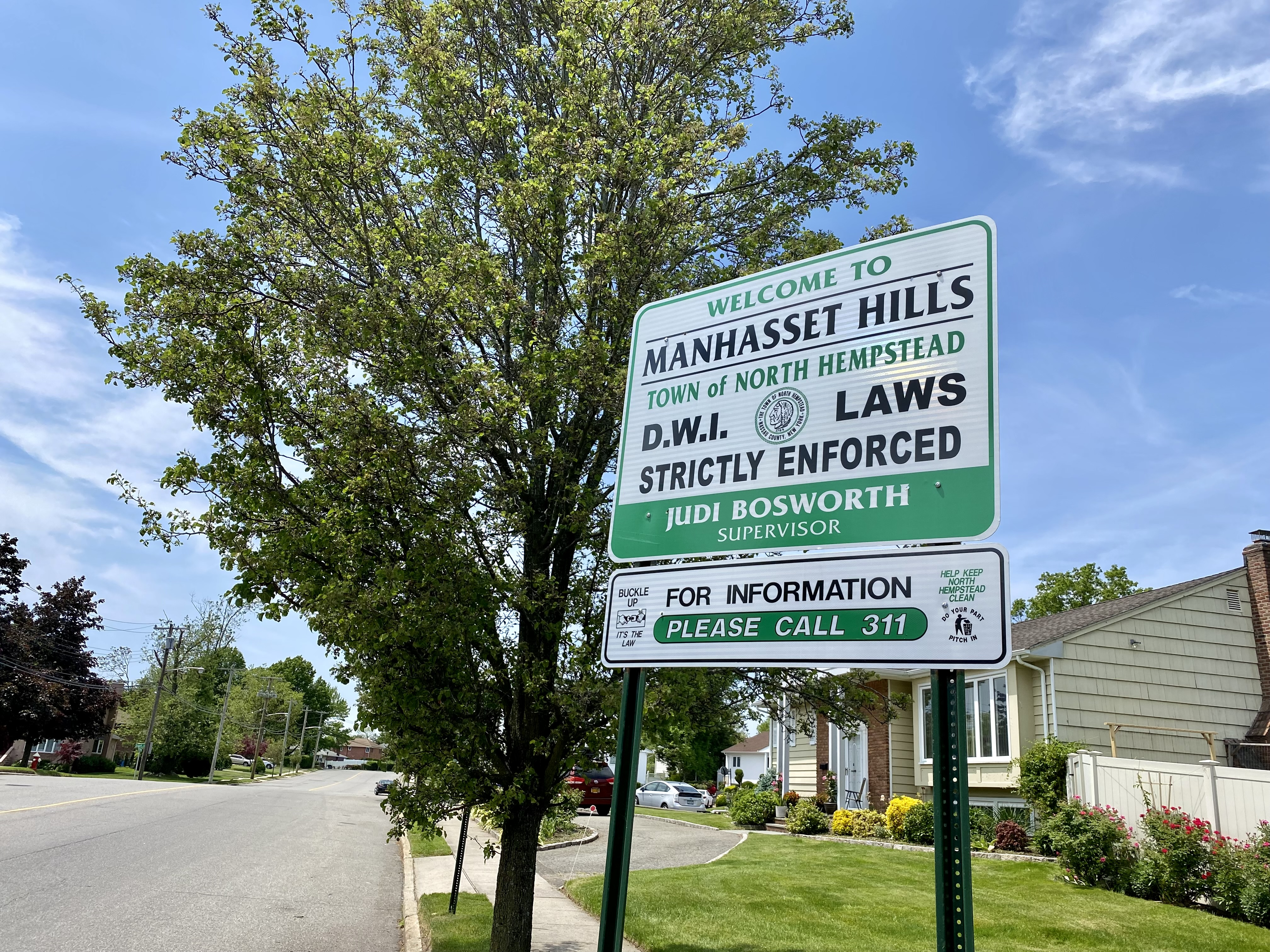
- A Manhasset Hills entrance sign in 2021

- Location in Nassau County and the state of New York

- Location on Long Island Location within the state of New York
- Coordinates: 40°45′33″N 73°40′47″W
- Country: United States
- State: New York
- County: Nassau
- Town: North Hempstead

Area
  - Total: 0.59 sq mi (1.53 km^{2})
  - Land: 0.59 sq mi (1.53 km^{2})
  - Water: 0 sq mi (0.00 km^{2})
- Elevation: 125 ft (38 m)

Population (2020)
  - Total: 3,649
  - Density: 6,171.6/sq mi (2,382.85/km^{2})
- Time zone: UTC-5 (Eastern (EST))
  - Summer (DST): UTC-4 (EDT)
- ZIP code: 11040
- Area codes: 516, 363
- FIPS code: 36-44908
- GNIS feature ID: 1867410

Manhasset Hills (also known by its historical name, Plattsdale) is a hamlet and census-designated place (CDP) located within the Town of North Hempstead in Nassau County, on Long Island, in New York, United States. The population was 3,649 at the time of the 2020 census.

Neighboring communities include Herricks, North Hills, North New Hyde Park, and Lake Success.

== History ==
By the late 1950s, much of the land in Manhasset Hills had been developed into residential neighborhoods by developers. One of the last major developments to be built was the Cherrywood Homes development, which was built on a 24-acre (9.7 ha) tract by Barney and Martin Spiegel. The development was built with 88 split-level houses designed by A.H. Salkowitz, and was developed on one of the last remaining major undeveloped tracts of land available in Manhasset Hills.

In the 1980s and 1990s, roughly 1,000 Manhasset Hills residents attempted to prevent the State of New York from placing a group home in their neighborhood for people with mental disabilities. Many were concerned that their property values would decrease because of the group home's presence, and attempted to change a law in order to prevent the home from being established. The residents were successful in preventing the group home from being established in their community, and the home was instead established in nearby New Hyde Park.

The Long Island Motor Parkway used to run along the northern border of the hamlet.

== Geography ==
According to the United States Census Bureau, the CDP has a total area of 0.6 square miles (1.6 km^{2}), all land.

=== Climate ===
According to the Köppen climate classification, Manhasset Hills has a Humid subtropical climate (type Cfa) with cool, wet winters and hot, humid summers. Precipitation is uniform throughout the year, with slight spring and fall peaks.

Climate data for Manhasset Hills, New York, 1991–2020 normals, extremes 1999–present
Month	Jan	Feb	Mar	Apr	May	Jun	Jul	Aug	Sep	Oct	Nov	Dec	Year
Record high °F (°C)	71 (22)	73 (23)	85 (29)	94 (34)	97 (36)	103 (39)	105 (41)	104 (40)	100 (38)	90 (32)	83 (28)	76 (24)	105 (41)
Mean daily maximum °F (°C)	39 (4)	43 (6)	50 (10)	61 (16)	70 (21)	80 (27)	85 (29)	83 (28)	76 (24)	65 (18)	55 (13)	45 (7)	63 (17)
Mean daily minimum °F (°C)	26 (−3)	28 (−2)	34 (1)	42 (6)	51 (11)	61 (16)	66 (19)	65 (18)	58 (14)	48 (9)	40 (4)	31 (−1)	46 (8)
Record low °F (°C)	−10 (−23)	−7 (−22)	3 (−16)	13 (−11)	32 (0)	43 (6)	50 (10)	48 (9)	38 (3)	27 (−3)	10 (−12)	−1 (−18)	−10 (−23)
Average precipitation inches (mm)	3.62 (92)	3.17 (81)	4.35 (110)	4.15 (105)	3.90 (99)	3.85 (98)	4.40 (112)	3.72 (94)	3.91 (99)	4.08 (104)	3.73 (95)	3.82 (97)	46.7 (1,186)
Source: The Weather Channel

==== Plant zone ====
According to the United States Department of Agriculture (USDA), Manhasset Hills is located within hardiness zone 7b.

== Demographics ==
Historical population
Census	Pop.	Note	%±
2000	3,661		—
2010	3,592		−1.9%
2020	3,649		1.6%
U.S. Decennial Census

=== 2020 census ===
As of the 2020 census, Manhasset Hills had a population of 3,649. The median age was 44.5 years. 22.1% of residents were under the age of 18 and 21.5% of residents were 65 years of age or older. For every 100 females there were 96.3 males, and for every 100 females age 18 and over there were 94.7 males age 18 and over.

100.0% of residents lived in urban areas, while 0.0% lived in rural areas.

There were 1,119 households in Manhasset Hills, of which 37.0% had children under the age of 18 living in them. Of all households, 79.4% were married-couple households, 6.3% were households with a male householder and no spouse or partner present, and 13.4% were households with a female householder and no spouse or partner present. About 10.0% of all households were made up of individuals and 7.5% had someone living alone who was 65 years of age or older.

There were 1,154 housing units, of which 3.0% were vacant. The homeowner vacancy rate was 0.7% and the rental vacancy rate was 2.4%.

Racial composition as of the 2020 census
Race	Number	Percent
White	1,336	36.6%
Black or African American	32	0.9%
American Indian and Alaska Native	13	0.4%
Asian	1,980	54.3%
Native Hawaiian and Other Pacific Islander	0	0.0%
Some other race	101	2.8%
Two or more races	187	5.1%
Hispanic or Latino (of any race)	237	6.5%

=== 2000 census ===
As of the census of 2000, there were 3,661 people, 1,224 households, and 1,068 families residing in the CDP. The population density was 6,175.1 inhabitants per square mile (2,384.2/km^{2}). There were 1,235 housing units at an average density of 2,083.1 per square mile (804.3/km^{2}). The racial makeup of the CDP was 70.39% White, 0.36% African American, 0.03% Native American, 27.04% Asian, 0.66% from other races, and 1.53% from two or more races. Hispanic or Latino of any race were 3.31% of the population.

There were 1,224 households, out of which 37.2% had children under the age of 18 living with them, 81.2% were married couples living together, 4.2% had a female householder with no husband present, and 12.7% were non-families. 10.5% of all households were made up of individuals, and 7.4% had someone living alone who was 65 years of age or older. The average household size was 2.99 and the average family size was 3.22.

In the CDP, the population was spread out, with 24.2% under the age of 18, 6.0% from 18 to 24, 20.3% from 25 to 44, 29.0% from 45 to 64, and 20.4% who were 65 years of age or older. The median age was 45 years. For every 100 females, there were 92.0 males. For every 100 females age 18 and over, there were 89.1 males.

The median income for a household in the CDP was $103,540, and the median income for a family was $109,613. Males had a median income of $78,223 versus $48,542 for females. The per capita income for the CDP was $45,009. About 2.3% of families and 2.8% of the population were below the poverty line, including 4.5% of those under age 18 and 3.9% of those age 65 or over.

== Economy ==
Manhasset Hills is a bedroom community of the City of New York and, as such, a significant number of Manhasset Hills residents commute to/from New York for work.

The hamlet itself is predominantly residential in character, with the heavy majority of lots within the village being zoned for single-family homes. The only area of Manhasset Hills zoned for commercial or industrial uses is located at the extreme southwest corner of the hamlet.

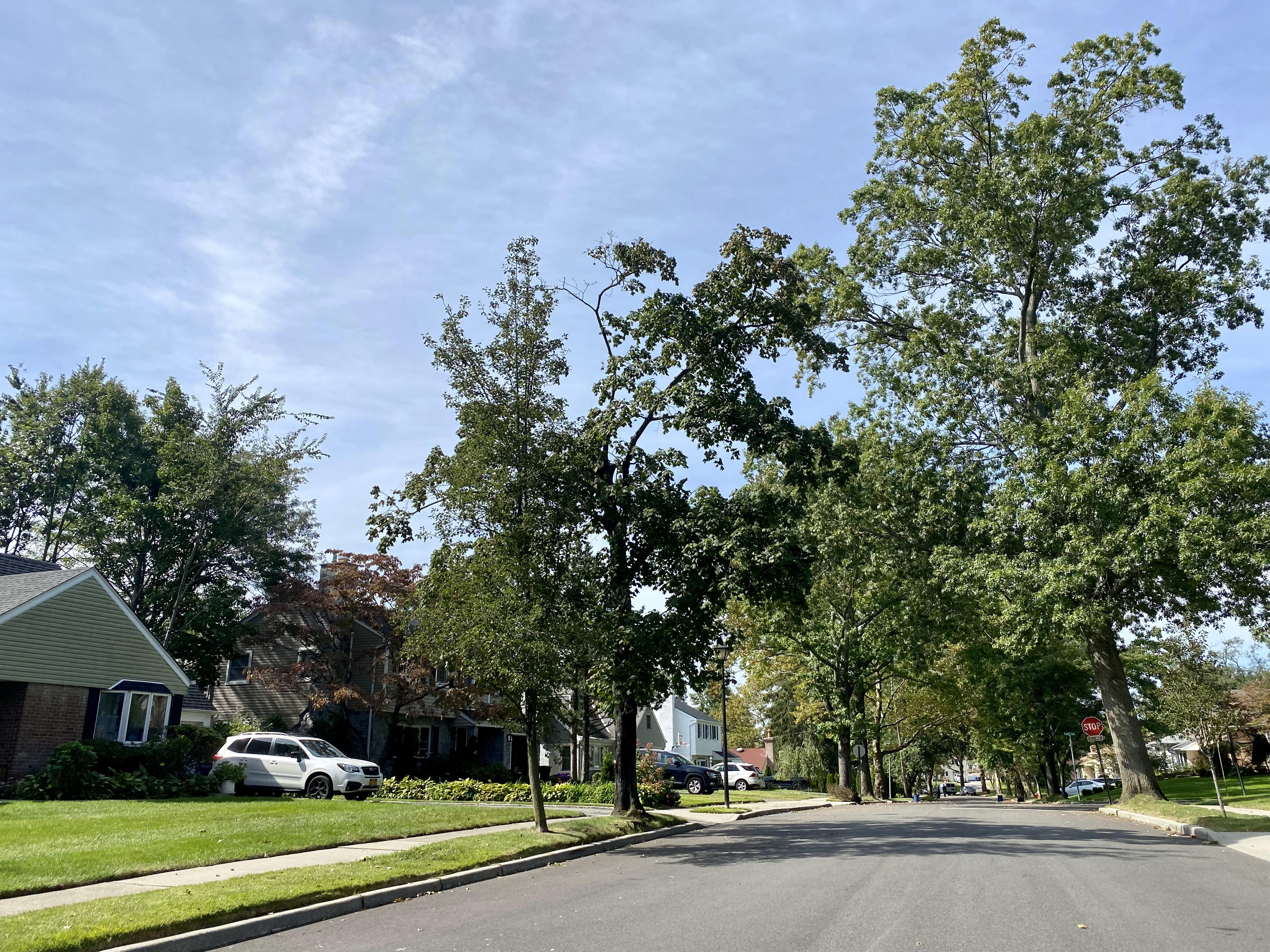
Crest Road in the Shelter Rock Manor neighborhood, showing single-family homes typical of the hamlet's residential areas

== Government ==
=== Town representation ===
As Manhasset Hills is an unincorporated part of the Town of North Hempstead, it is directly governed by the town's government in Manhasset.

Manhasset Hills is located in the Town of North Hempstead's 4th council district, which as of August 2024 is represented on the North Hempstead Town Council by Christine Liu (D–Herricks).

=== Representation in higher government ===
==== Nassau County representation ====
Manhasset Hills is located in Nassau County's 10th Legislative district, which as of January 2023 is represented in the Nassau County Legislature by Mazi Melesa Pilip (R–Great Neck).

==== New York State representation ====
===== New York State Assembly =====
Manhasset Hills is located in the New York State Assembly's 16th State Assembly district, which as of September 2021 is represented by Gina L. Sillitti (D–Manorhaven).

===== New York State Senate =====
Manhasset Hills is located in the New York State Senate's 7th State Senate district, which as of August 2024 is represented by Jack M. Martins (R–Old Westbury).

==== Federal representation ====
===== United States Congress =====
Manhasset Hills is located entirely within New York's 3rd Congressional district, which as of August 2024 is represented in the United States Congress by Thomas R. Suozzi (D–Glen Cove).

===== United States Senate =====
Like the rest of New York, Manhasset Hills is represented in the United States Senate by Charles Schumer (D) and Kirsten Gillibrand (D).

=== Politics ===
In the 2024 U.S. presidential election, the majority of Manhasset Hills voters voted for Donald J. Trump (R).

== Parks and recreation ==
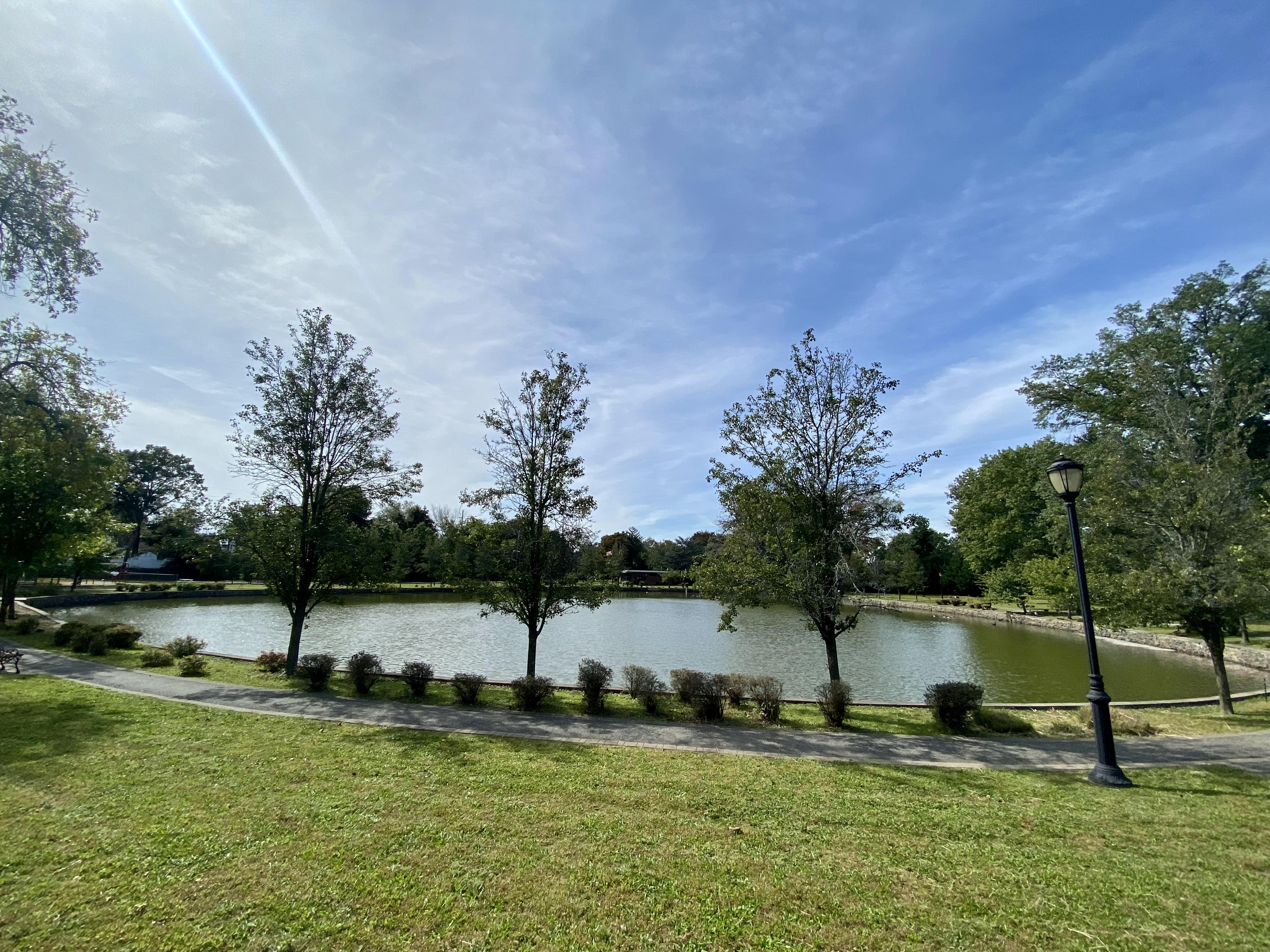
Ridder's Pond Park in 2021, viewed from Meadow Farm Drive

The Town of North Hempstead owns and maintains two parks within the hamlet:

- Clinton G. Martin Park
- Ridder's Pond Park

== Education ==
=== School districts ===
Manhasset Hills is primarily located within the boundaries of (and is thus served by) the Herricks Union Free School District, although the westernmost portion of the hamlet is located within the boundaries of the Great Neck Union Free School District. Accordingly, children who reside within Manhasset Hills and attend public schools go to school in one of these two districts depending on where they reside within the hamlet.

=== Library districts ===
Manhasset Hills is located within the boundaries of the Great Neck Library District and the Shelter Rock Library District, which are served by the Great Neck Public Library and the Shelter Rock Public Library, respectively. The boundaries of these two districts within the hamlet roughly correspond to the school district boundaries.

== Infrastructure ==
=== Transportation ===
==== Road ====
A small portion of the Northern State Parkway traverses the northeastern corner of the hamlet; the historic Long Island Motor Parkway formerly passed through Manhasset Hills, as well. The southwestern corner of the hamlet touches Union Turnpike, and the southwestern tip of the hamlet is at Hillside Avenue (NY 25B).

Other major roads which travel through Manhasset Hills include Denton Avenue, Marcus Avenue, New Hyde Park Road, Old Courthouse Road, and Shelter Rock Road.

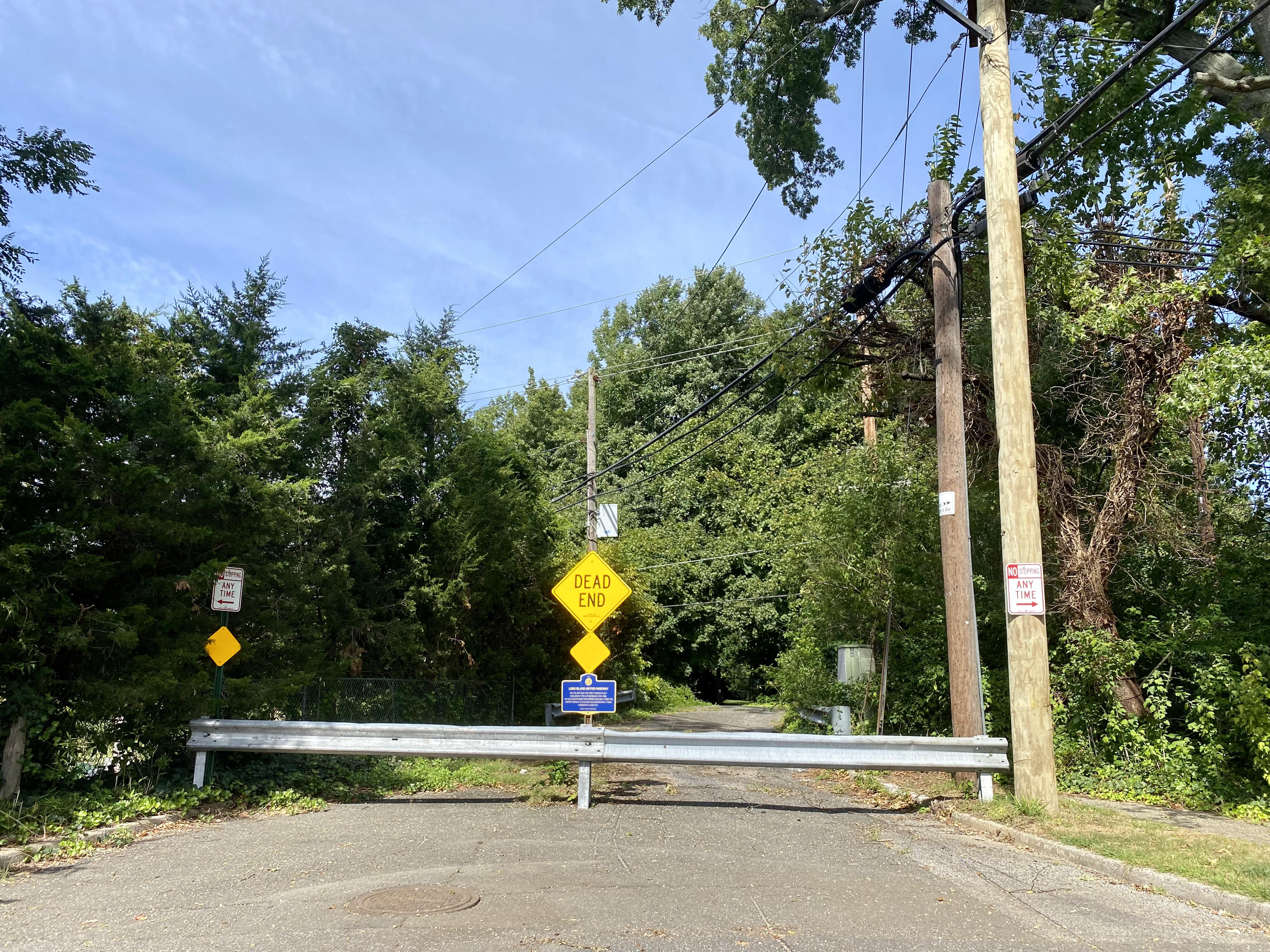
The dead-end on Old Courthouse Road, at the historic overpass that once carried it over the Long Island Motor Parkway

==== Bus ====
The n25 and n26 run along New Hyde Park Road at the western edge of the hamlet. Both of these bus lines are operated by Nassau Inter-County Express (NICE).

=== Utilities ===
==== Natural gas ====
National Grid USA provides natural gas to all properties in Manhasset Hills that are hooked up to natural gas lines.

==== Power ====
PSEG Long Island provides power to all properties and electrical infrastructure within Manhasset Hills, on behalf of the Long Island Power Authority.

The former Long Island Motor Parkway's right-of-way now serves as the route of a power transmission line through the area.

==== Sewage ====
All of Manhasset Hills is connected to sanitary sewers, which are part of the Nassau County Sewage District, which handles and treats the hamlet's sanitary waste.

==== Water ====
Manhasset Hills is located within the boundaries of the Garden City Park Water District and the Manhasset–Lakeville Water District. The boundaries of these two districts within the hamlet roughly correspond to the school district boundaries.

== Landmarks ==
- Cornell-Van Nostrand House – Listed on the National Register of Historic Places and on the Town of North Hempstead's landmark registry; located within Clinton G. Martin Park.
- Old Courthouse Road Bridge – Historic bridge over the former Long Island Motor Parkway.

== Notable people ==
- Mitchell Schwarzer – Architectural historian.

== See also ==
- List of Census-designated places in New York
- Manhasset, New York
