= Mitchell Schwarzer =

American architectural historian

Mitchell Schwarzer (born 1957) is an American historian who is professor emeritus at California College of the Arts. His scholarly publications and presentations primarily address the history and theory of architecture and the urban environment.

== Early years ==
Mitchell was born at the Norton Air Force Base hospital in San Bernardino, California; to parents Sigmund and Genia Schwarzer, Polish Holocaust survivors. His family moved to an apartment in Queens, New York; and eventually to a Hi-Ranch house in Manhasset Hills on Long Island. He graduated from Herricks High School in 1975.

== Education ==
Mitchell received his BA from Washington University in St. Louis in 1979 (including a semester abroad program in Florence, Italy), and his master's in City and Regional Planning from Harvard University in 1981. In 1986, he began doctoral study in the history, theory and criticism of architecture at the Massachusetts Institute of Technology, and received his Ph.D. in 1991. While researching his dissertation on Adolf Loos he lived for a year as a Fulbright scholar in Vienna, Austria.

== City Planner ==
From 1982 through 1986 Schwarzer worked for Environmental Science Associates, an environmental consulting firm in the San Francisco Bay Area, where he contributed to the urban design and historic resources sections of environmental impact reports, and later the San Francisco Department of City Planning, where he was one of the authors of the Downtown Plan (1985) and Historic Preservation Element of the Master Plan (1989).

== Academic positions ==
Schwarzer's first tenure-track position was at the University of Illinois at Chicago, where he taught in the art history department from 1991 to 1995. He began teaching at California College of the Arts -- then called California College of Arts and Crafts -- in 1996, and received tenure in 1998. At CCA, he co-founded the school's master's program in visual criticism (now called visual and critical studies) and founded the schools undergraduate major in the History of Art and Visual Culture. He also was Executive Editor of Design Book Review from 1999-2001.

== Writing ==
His publications include five books, two map guides, an edited journal, and over 125 articles and essays. They analyze the philosophical and theoretical ramifications of architecture and urbanism in the modern era, including responses to changing technologies, economies, politics, and professional practices. A through-line in his works concerns both physical changes to buildings, transportation corridors, and public/private spaces alongside our perceptions and social or psychological reactions to those changes. His early research investigated how German and Austrian architects and scholars viewed the industrialization and growth of the Germanic lands in the nineteenth century as well as the disciplinary origins of art history in the Germanic lands. He extended those studies into a broader assessment of how the industrialization of movement (transportation infrastructure) and perception (screens) impacted the ways we understand and interact with the urbanized environment. Schwarzer subsequently examined the historiography and experience of urban infrastructure. Several of his publications concern Jewish religious topics, museums and the Holocaust.. He has also written widely on California architecture and urbanism.

== Personal ==
Mitchell lives in Oakland, California with his wife Marjorie, a museum historian and educator.

== Books ==
- Hella Town: Oakland's History of Development and Disruption, University of California Press (2021) ISBN 978-0520381124
- Architecture of the San Francisco Bay Area: History and Guide, William Stout (2006) ISBN 0-9746214-5-5
- Zoomscape: Architecture in Motion and Media, Princeton Architectural Press (2004) ISBN 1-56898-441-3
- Architecture and Design: SF, Understanding Business (1998) ISBN 0-9641863-4-9
- German Architectural Theory and the Search for Modern Identity, Cambridge University Press (1995) ISBN 0-521-48150-3
