= Toll Gate House =

- Roslyn East Gate Toll Gate House
- U.S. National Register of Historic Places
- New York State Register of Historic Places
- Town of North Hempstead Designated Landmark
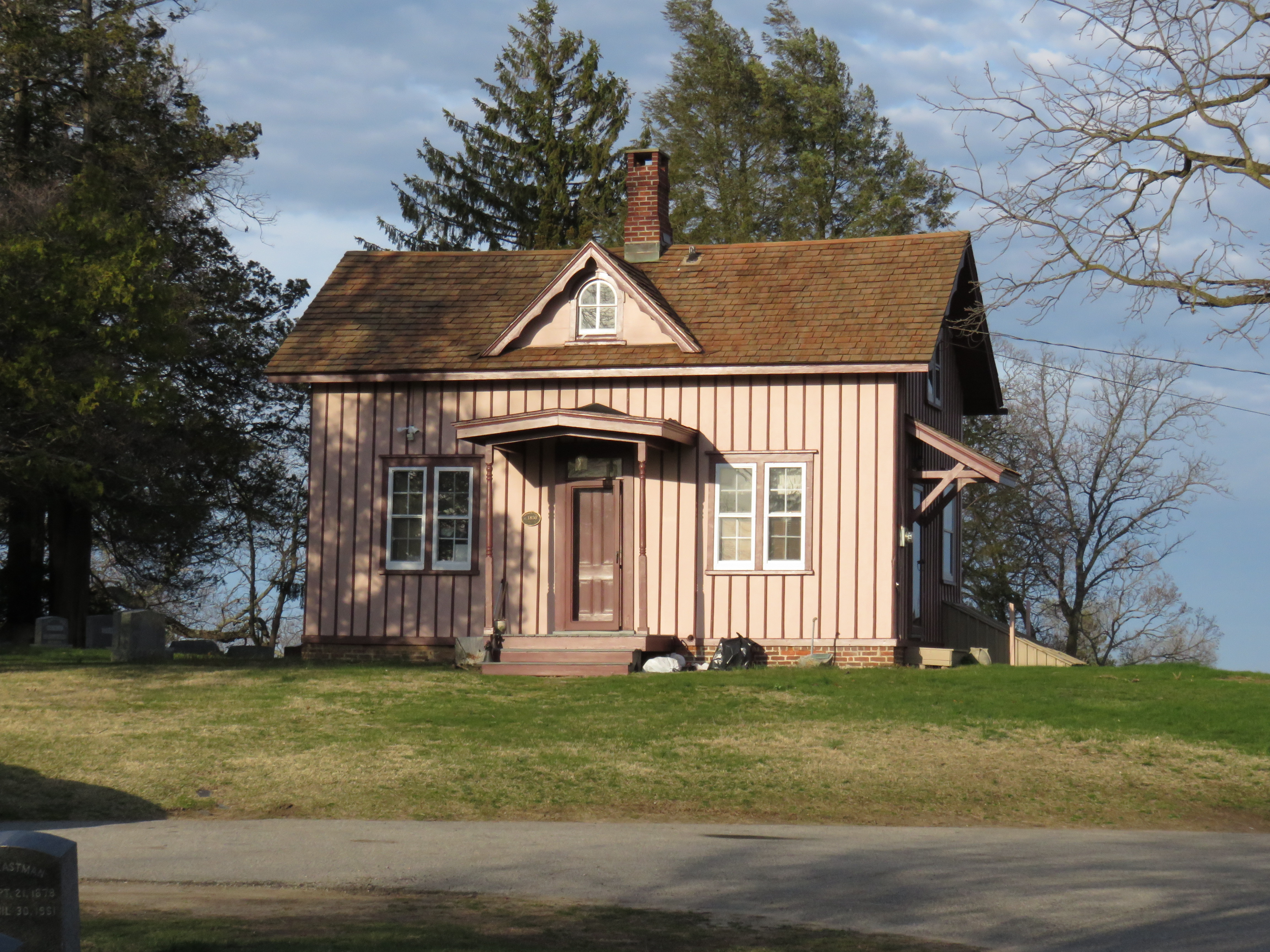
- The Roslyn East Gate Toll House in 2016

- Location within New York Location within the United States
- Location: Northern Boulevard, Greenvale, New York
- Coordinates: 40°48′31″N 73°37′56″W
- Built: 1860
- NRHP reference No.: 77000952

Significant dates
- Added to NRHP: August 16, 1977
- Designated NYSRHP: June 23, 1980
- Designated TNHDL: June 24, 1986

The Roslyn East Gate Toll House is a historic building located within the Roslyn Cemetery on Northern Boulevard (NY 25A) in Greenvale within the Town of North Hempstead, in Nassau County, New York, United States.

== Description ==
It was built in 1864 and is the last remaining toll house for the North Hempstead Turnpike. It is frequently but incorrectly assumed to be a toll house for the "Vanderbilt Motor Parkway" which ran considerably south of this location.

Over the years as development continued, the North Hempstead Turnpike was moved about 150 feet south of its original path (now called Northern Blvd.) and the Roslyn Cemetery (owned by the Roslyn Presbyterian Church) slowly surrounded the "East Gate Toll House". There was a "West Gate Toll House" on the western side of the William Cullen Bryant Viaduct – but either due to massive renovation or removal it is no longer recognizable.

With the demise of the toll road, the Roslyn East Gate Toll House became no more than a storage shed for cemetery tools.

In the early 1980s, Dr. Roger Gerry (President of the Roslyn Landmark Society) desired to have the Roslyn East Gate Toll House restored. Due to budget constraints of the Roslyn Presbyterian Church, this was not possible.

A solution was found by a three way agreement between the Roslyn Landmark Society, the Roslyn Presbyterian Church and Richard Hahn, whereby Hahn would restore the building at his time and expense to the specifications of the Roslyn Landmark Society. In return, he would utilize the building for his own residence. A historical architect prepared detailed drawings, microscopic paint analysis was done on all painted surfaces to determine original paint colors and after two years of work by Richard Hahn the project was completed to specifications.

The Roslyn East Gate Toll House has been included in the Roslyn Landmark Society's annual "Roslyn Walking Tour" and a very detailed description of its history written by Dr. Roger Gerry which can be found in one of the "Roslyn Landmark" tour guides. It continues to be a private residence.

In the fall of 2024, the Roslyn Presbyterian Church repainted the Toll House "baby blue" despite covenants and restrictions preventing this type of modification, as this was the first historic house on Long Island to utilize microscopic paint analysis.

It was added to the National Register of Historic Places on August 16, 1977. Just shy of three years later, on June 23, 1980, it was listed on the New York State Register of Historic Places – and on June 24, 1986, it was listed as a Town of North Hempstead Designated Landmark.

== See also ==
- National Register of Historic Places listings in North Hempstead (town), New York
- List of Town of North Hempstead Designated Landmarks
