= Cornell-Van Nostrand House =

Historic house in New York, United States

- Cornell-Van Nostrand House; Schumacher House
- U.S. National Register of Historic Places
- Town of North Hempstead Designated Landmark
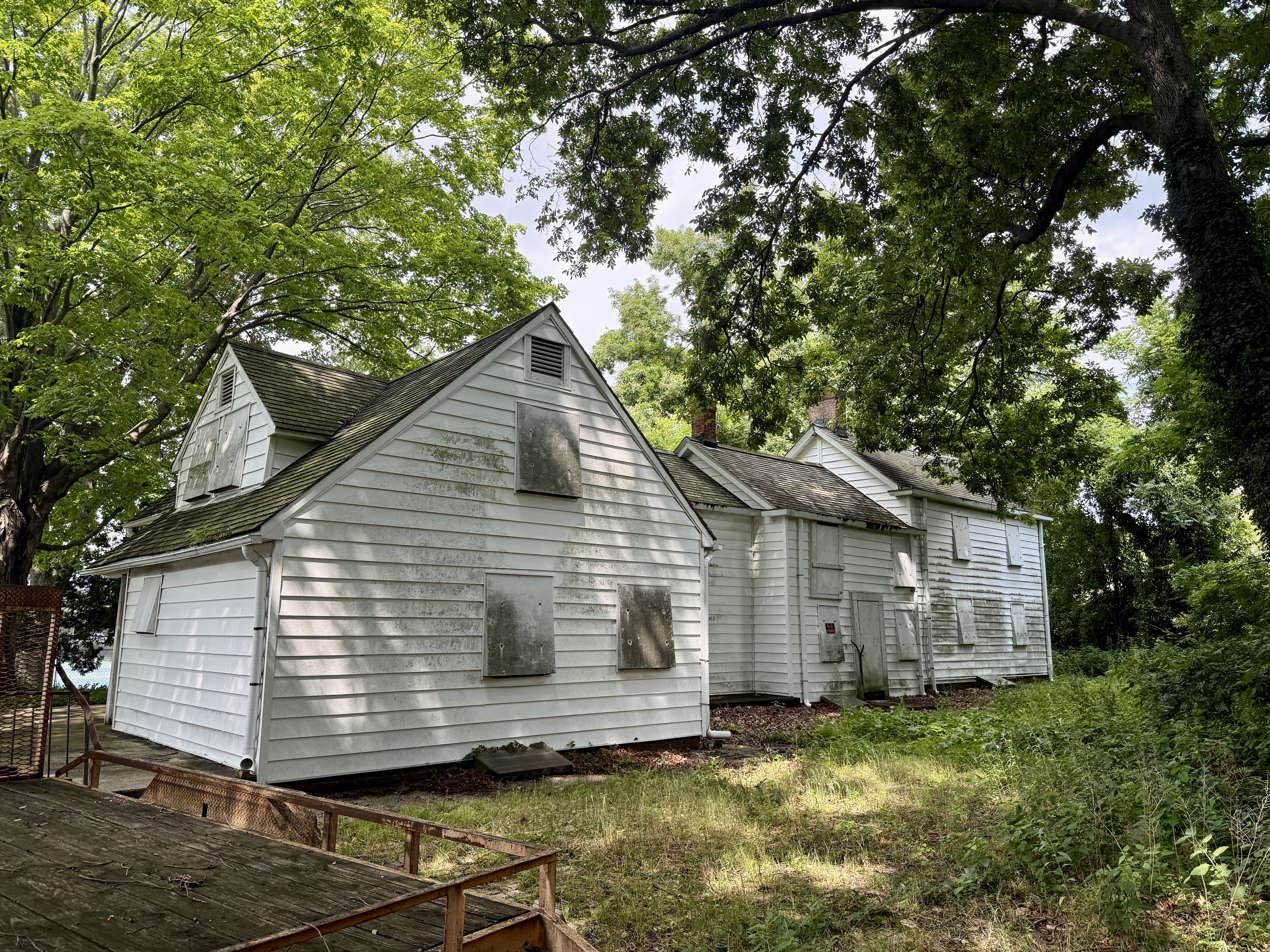
- The Cornell-Van Nostrand House in 2026

- Location within New York Location within the United States
- Location: Clinton G. Martin Park; New Hyde Park Rd. & Marcus Ave. Manhasset Hills, New York
- Coordinates: 40°45′33″N 73°41′15″W
- Area: less than one acre
- Built: 1690
- Architectural style: Greek Revival, Colonial Revival
- Restored: 2017
- NRHP reference No.: 07000863

Significant dates
- Added to NRHP: August 28, 2007
- Designated TNHDL: June 27, 1995

The Cornell-Van Nostrand House (also known as the Schumacher House) is a historic home located in the hamlet of Manhasset Hills, in the Town of North Hempstead, Nassau County, New York, United States.

== Description ==
The house was moved to its present location, on the grounds of what is now Clinton G. Martin Park in Manhasset Hills, in 1952. It is a two-story, architecturally mixed wood-frame building containing an early 19th-century section, two mid-19th-century sections, and an early 20th-century addition. It is arranged in a T-shaped plan on a concrete foundation with brick above grade. It features a single-height portico with square Doric order columns and a simple entablature, built about 1850.

It was designated a Town of North Hempstead Landmark in 2005. Two years later, in 2007, it was listed on the National Register of Historic Places.

=== Restoration ===
By the 2010s, the house fell into a state of advanced disrepair, boarded up and exposed to the elements via numerous holes in the roof. In 2017, an extensive rehabilitation & restoration project was subsequently undertaken by the Town of North Hempstead, bringing the structure back to a state of good repair. The project was executed through a $500,000 New York State grant.

== See also ==
- National Register of Historic Places listings in North Hempstead (town), New York
