= Wheatley Plaza =

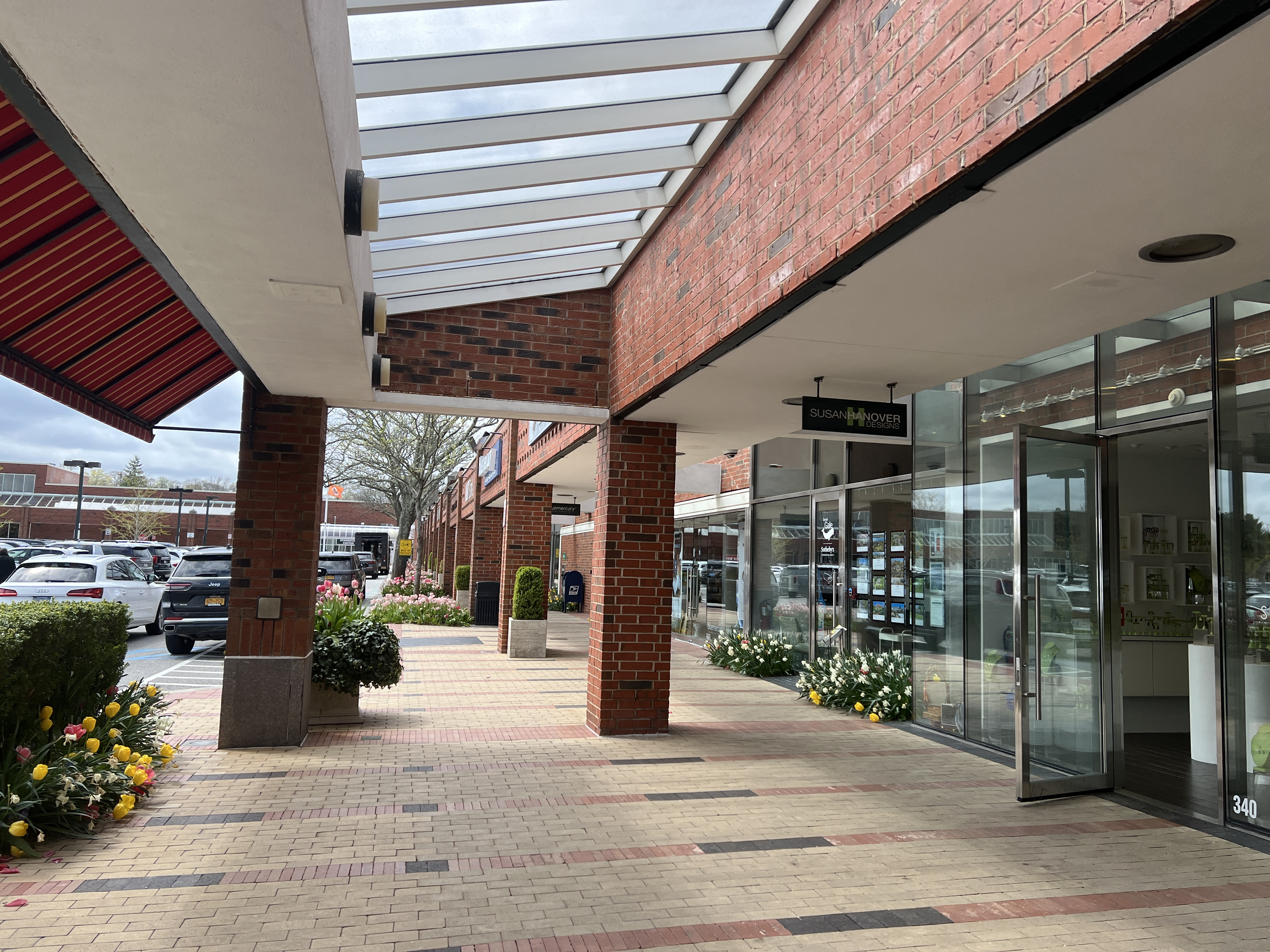
- Wheatley Plaza in 2024
- Location: Greenvale, New York
- Coordinates: 40°48′34″N 73°37′34″W
- Address: Wheatley Plaza; Greenvale, NY 11548
- Opened: 1980
- Developer: Castagna & Sons (now Castagna Realty)
- Owner: Castagna Realty
- Parking: Lighted lot; free
- Public transit: Nassau Inter-County Express: n20H, n27
- Website: www.wheatleyplaza.com

Wheatley Plaza (also known as the Wheatley Plaza Mall and as the Wheatley Gardens Mall) is an outdoor shopping center located at the southeastern corner of the intersection of Northern Boulevard (NY 25A) and Glen Cove Road (CR 1) in Greenvale, in the North Hempstead, New York, United States. The center is owned and maintained by Manhasset-based Castagna Realty.

== History ==
Wheatley Plaza was planned by Castagna & Sons (now Castagna Realty) – the same company responsible for the Americana Manhasset in the Strathmore section of Manhasset. First proposed by Castagna in 1977, the center was constructed in 1980, as one of the first shopping centers of its type on Long Island. It was built on the site of the former Wheatley Gardens flower nursery, and was designed to blend in with the surrounding community.

When originally planned in 1977, the 9.57-acre (3.87 ha) development was envisioned to contain a movie theater, a supermarket, restaurants, and several retail stores. By 1978, when the Town of North Hempstead approved an extension of the rezoning of the land from residential to business & parking, to permit the center's construction (which was scheduled to commence that fall), the plans were amended. The amended plans retained the supermarket, restaurants, and 20-to-25 stores, but eliminated the movie theater; the rezoning was granted in 1977 but due to construction not beginning until the fall of 1978, more than 12 months after it was first granted, North Hempstead's laws required an extension to be granted. In its early planning phase, the center drew a considerable amount of opposition due to fears that the development would worsen the chronic congestion issues at the intersection of Northern Boulevard and Glen Cove Road. The project and the rezoning had the support of then-Town Supervisor Michael J. Tully Jr., who argued that the center & rezoning would be a better land use than the strip malls which could have otherwise been constructed.

The center soon secured anchor tenants, with Pathmark opening a large store in the supermarket space the year Wheatley Plaza opened, and with Ben's Kosher Deli opening a location in 1982. The establishment of the Pathmark at Wheatley Plaza was mentioned in The Washington Post in 1989, regarding the impacts had on smaller grocery stores in a community when large supermarkets begin competing with them.

In August 1980, shortly after Wheatley Plaza's opening, the 58 families which moved into the then-new Northern Woods Estates development in the Village of East Hills – located directly behind the parking lot – voiced complaints about the shopping center's lights at night, leading to a landscape screening to block the light from entering the neighborhood and the houses.

In 2011, Brooks Brothers opened a Fleece store at Wheatley Plaza; this was the company's third location to open in the United States.

In 2015, the Pathmark at Wheatley Plaza closed, following the bankruptcy of A&P, after having been a tenant of the center since its opening in 1980. It was subsequently replaced by a Stop & Shop the same year.

== See also ==
- Americana Manhasset – Another Castagna-owned shopping mall in North Hempstead, located in nearby Manhasset.
- Lake Success Shopping Center
