= Greenvale, New York =

- Hamlet and census-designated place
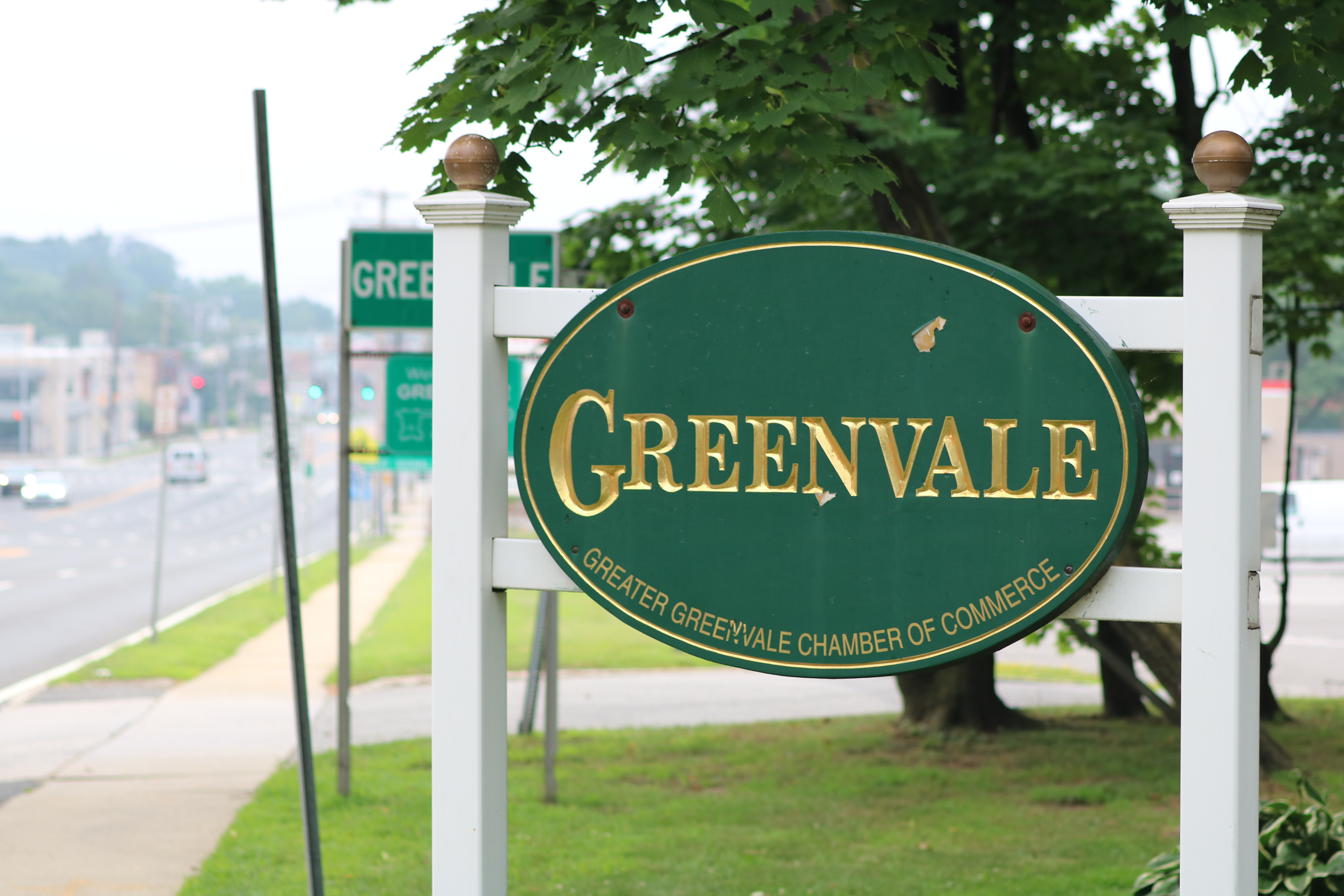
- A Greenvale welcome sign on Northern Boulevard in 2018
- Motto: "Key to the Gold Coast"
- Location in Nassau County and the state of New York

- Location on Long Island Location within the state of New York
- Coordinates: 40°48′47″N 73°37′32″W
- Country: United States
- State: New York
- County: Nassau
- Towns: North Hempstead; Oyster Bay

Area
  - Total: 0.25 sq mi (0.65 km^{2})
  - Land: 0.25 sq mi (0.65 km^{2})
  - Water: 0 sq mi (0.00 km^{2})
- Elevation: 187 ft (57 m)

Population (2020)
  - Total: 1,069
  - Density: 4,281.6/sq mi (1,653.15/km^{2})
- Time zone: UTC−05:00 (Eastern (EST))
  - Summer (DST): UTC−04:00 (EDT)
- ZIP code: 11548
- Area codes: 516, 363
- FIPS code: 36-30598
- GNIS feature ID: 0951769

Greenvale (historically known as Bull's Head, Cedar Swamp, and North Roslyn) is a hamlet and census-designated place (CDP) located within the towns of North Hempstead and Oyster Bay in Nassau County, on the North Shore of Long Island, in New York, United States. It is considered part of the Greater Roslyn area, which is anchored by the Incorporated Village of Roslyn. The population was 1,069 at the time of the 2020 census.

== History ==
Located between Roslyn and Brookville, the Greenvale station is known as the Long Island Rail Road stop for the C.W. Post Campus of Long Island University and the New York Institute of Technology. While LIU Post is located to the east in Brookville, it uses the Greenvale, NY 11548 ZIP Code and the Greenvale Post Office.

Until 1866, the community was known as "Cedar Swamp", and later known as "Bull's Head", until some point in the early 20th century; it has also been known historically as "North Roslyn".

On January 13, 1933, the Greenvale Post Office was established. It moved to its current location in 1976; the original post office location was subsequently purchased by a local business.

While many residential areas in the hamlet were developed prior to the Second World War, the 1940s and 1950s saw the development of the area adjacent to the Roslyn Cemetery and the Long Island Rail Road tracks (including Park Avenue and Wellington Road).

A major shopping center, Wheatley Plaza, opened in Greenvale in 1980, on the former site of Wheatley Gardens – a nursery. Developed by Castagna Realty – the owners of the Americana Manhasset – and first proposed in 1977, the center's construction required a change in land use from residential to business and parking.

== Geography ==
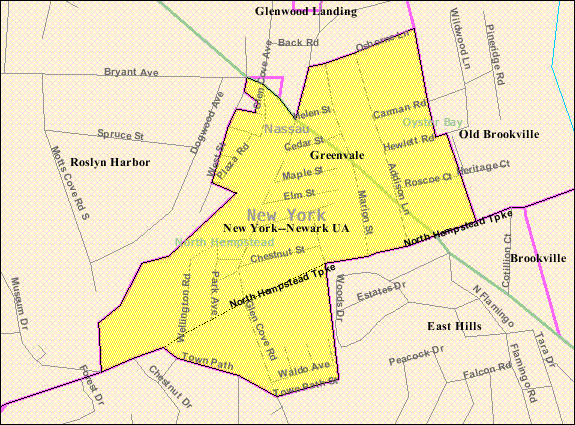
U.S. Census map of Greenvale

According to the United States Census Bureau, the CDP has a total area of 0.3 square miles (0.78 km^{2}), all land.

Greenvale is located mainly within the Town of North Hempstead, while a small portion is located in the Town of Oyster Bay.

=== Topography ===
Like the rest of Long Island's North Shore, Greenvale is situated on a terminal moraine, known as the Harbor Hill Moraine. This terminal moraine was formed by glaciers during the Wisconsin Glacial Episode, and is named for Harbor Hill in Roslyn and East Hills; Harbor Hill is the highest geographic point in Nassau County.

=== Drainage ===
According to the United States Geological Survey and the United States Environmental Protection Agency, Greenvale is located within the Hempstead Harbor Watershed, which itself is located within the larger Long Island Sound/Atlantic Ocean Watershed.

=== Climate ===
According to the Köppen climate classification, Greenvale has a Humid subtropical climate (type Cfa) with cool, wet winters and hot, humid summers. Precipitation is uniform throughout the year, with slight spring and fall peaks.

Climate data for Greenvale, New York
Month	Jan	Feb	Mar	Apr	May	Jun	Jul	Aug	Sep	Oct	Nov	Dec	Year
Record high °F (°C)	71 (22)	73 (23)	87 (31)	94 (34)	97 (36)	101 (38)	108 (42)	105 (41)	97 (36)	89 (32)	83 (28)	76 (24)	108 (42)
Mean daily maximum °F (°C)	40.4 (4.7)	42.9 (6.1)	51.1 (10.6)	61.2 (16.2)	70.6 (21.4)	79.6 (26.4)	84.5 (29.2)	83.3 (28.5)	76.0 (24.4)	65.4 (18.6)	55.7 (13.2)	45.1 (7.3)	63.0 (17.2)
Daily mean °F (°C)	33.4 (0.8)	35.0 (1.7)	42.0 (5.6)	51.8 (11.0)	60.8 (16.0)	70.1 (21.2)	75.2 (24.0)	74.1 (23.4)	67.2 (19.6)	56.5 (13.6)	47.8 (8.8)	38.2 (3.4)	54.3 (12.4)
Mean daily minimum °F (°C)	26.4 (−3.1)	27.1 (−2.7)	33.5 (0.8)	42.4 (5.8)	51.0 (10.6)	60.6 (15.9)	65.8 (18.8)	65.0 (18.3)	58.3 (14.6)	47.6 (8.7)	39.9 (4.4)	31.2 (−0.4)	45.7 (7.6)
Record low °F (°C)	−4 (−20)	−5 (−21)	5 (−15)	13 (−11)	34 (1)	43 (6)	50 (10)	46 (8)	36 (2)	27 (−3)	17 (−8)	−2 (−19)	−5 (−21)
Average precipitation inches (mm)	3.56 (90)	2.87 (73)	4.47 (114)	3.85 (98)	3.23 (82)	3.54 (90)	3.97 (101)	4.26 (108)	4.31 (109)	4.08 (104)	3.18 (81)	3.99 (101)	45.31 (1,151)
Average snowfall inches (cm)	5.5 (14)	7.8 (20)	3.7 (9.4)	0.3 (0.76)	0 (0)	0 (0)	0 (0)	0 (0)	0 (0)	0 (0)	0.2 (0.51)	5.7 (14)	23.2 (58.67)
Average relative humidity (%)	73	75	72	72	75	74	73	71	73	73	71	75	73
Mean monthly sunshine hours	177	153	172	167	202	213	237	241	215	190	210	171	2,348
Average ultraviolet index	2	2	2	3	5	6	6	6	5	3	2	2	4
Source: NOAA; Weather Atlas

==== Plant zone ====
According to the United States Department of Agriculture (USDA), Greenvale is located within hardiness zone 7b.

== Demographics ==
Historical population
Census	Pop.	Note	%±
2000	2,231		—
2010	1,904		−14.7%
2020	1,069		−43.9%
U.S. Decennial Census

As of the census of 2000, there were 2,231 people, 362 households, and 254 families residing in the CDP. The population density was 8,674.4 inhabitants per square mile (3,349.2/km^{2}). There were 372 housing units at an average density of 1,446.4 per square mile (558.5/km^{2}). The racial makeup of the CDP was 66.11% White, 12.73% African American, 0.36% Native American, 10.49% Asian, 0.13% Pacific Islander, 7.08% from other races, and 3.09% from two or more races. Hispanic or Latino of any race were 13.09% of the population.

There were 362 households, out of which 32.6% had children under the age of 18 living with them, 58.8% were married couples living together, 8.6% had a female householder with no husband present, and 29.8% were non-families. 24.6% of all households were made up of individuals, and 10.5% had someone living alone who was 65 years of age or older. The average household size was 2.73 and the average family size was 3.22.

In the CDP, the population was spread out, with 10.0% under the age of 18, 55.4% from 18 to 24, 16.8% from 25 to 44, 11.7% from 45 to 64, and 6.1% who were 65 years of age or older. The median age was 22 years. For every 100 females, there were 79.9 males. For every 100 females age 18 and over, there were 77.1 males.

The median income for a household in the CDP was $59,500, and the median income for a family was $80,292. Males had a median income of $52,639 versus $30,000 for females. The per capita income for the CDP was $22,009. About 4.3% of families and 4.4% of the population were below the poverty line, including none of those under the age of eighteen or sixty-five or over.

== Government ==
=== Town representation ===
As Greenvale is an unincorporated area within the towns of North Hempstead and Oyster Bay, it is directly governed by the two towns; the parts of the hamlet within the Town of North Hempstead are governed directly by the Town of North Hempstead's government in Manhasset, while the parts of the hamlet in the Town of Oyster Bay are governed directly by the Town of Oyster Bay's government in Oyster Bay.

The parts of Greenvale in the Town of North Hempstead are located in its 2nd council district, which as of April 2024 is represented on the North Hempstead Town Council by Edward Scott (R–Albertson).

=== Representation in higher government ===
==== Nassau County representation ====
Greenvale is located in Nassau County's 18th Legislative district, which as of April 2024 is represented in the Nassau County Legislature by Samantha Goetz (R–Oyster Bay).

==== New York State representation ====
===== New York State Assembly =====
Greenvale is split between the New York State Assembly's 13th and 15th State Assembly districts, which as of April 2024 are represented by Charles D. Lavine (D–Glen Cove) and Jacob Ryan Blumencranz (R–Oyster Bay), respectively.

===== New York State Senate =====
Greenvale is located within the New York State Senate's 7th State Senate district, which as of April 2024 is represented in the New York State Senate by Jack M. Martins (R–Old Westbury).

==== Federal representation ====
===== United States Congress =====
Flower Hill is located entirely within New York's 3rd Congressional district, which as of April 2024 is represented in the United States Congress by Thomas R. Suozzi (D–Glen Cove).

==== United States Senate ====
Like the rest of New York, Greenvale is represented in the United States Senate by Charles Schumer (D) and Kirsten Gillibrand (D).

=== Politics ===
In the 2024 U.S. presidential election, the majority of Greenvale voters voted for Donald J. Trump (R).

== Education ==
=== Schools ===
==== School districts ====
Greenvale is split between the Roslyn Union Free School District and North Shore Central School District. Students who reside in Greenvale and attend public school will go to school in one of these two districts depending on where they live within the hamlet.

Most of the hamlet is within the Roslyn School District; the school district boundary between the Roslyn UFSD and the North Shore CSD within Greenvale corresponds with the North Hempstead–Oyster Bay town line.

==== Nassau BOCES facility ====
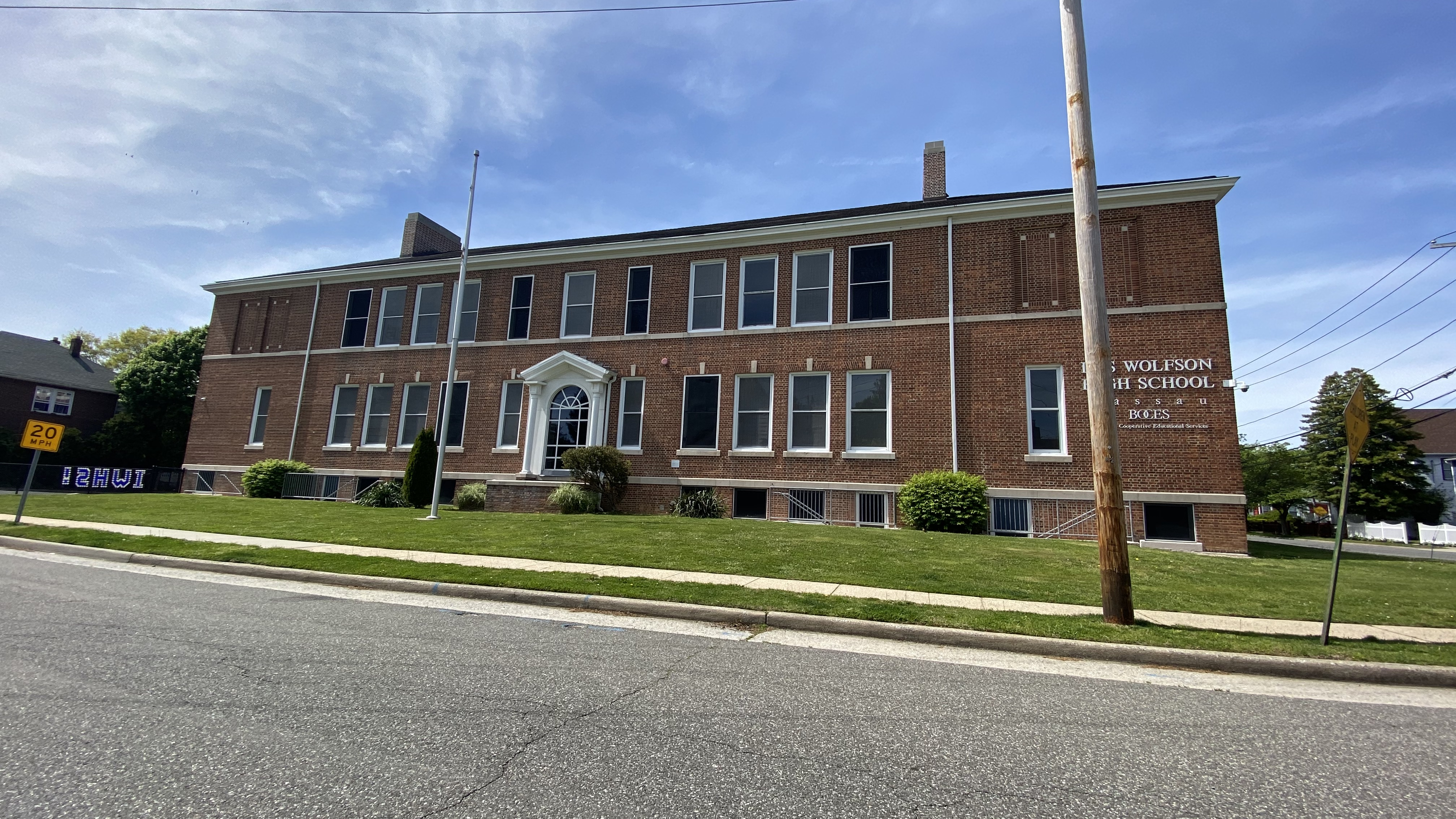
Iris Wolfson High School in 2020

The Nassau Board of Cooperative Education Services (BOCES)' Iris Wolfson High School is located within the hamlet, in the Roslyn Union Free School District's former North Roslyn School.

=== Library districts ===
Greenvale is located within the boundaries of Roslyn's library district and by the Gold Coast Library District. The boundaries of these districts within the hamlet correspond with those of the school districts. Accordingly, the parts of the hamlet within the Roslyn Union Free School District are also within Roslyn's library district (served by The Bryant Library in Roslyn), while the parts within the North Shore Central School District are also within the Gold Coast Library District (served by the Gold Coast Public Library in Glen Head).

== Infrastructure ==
=== Transportation ===
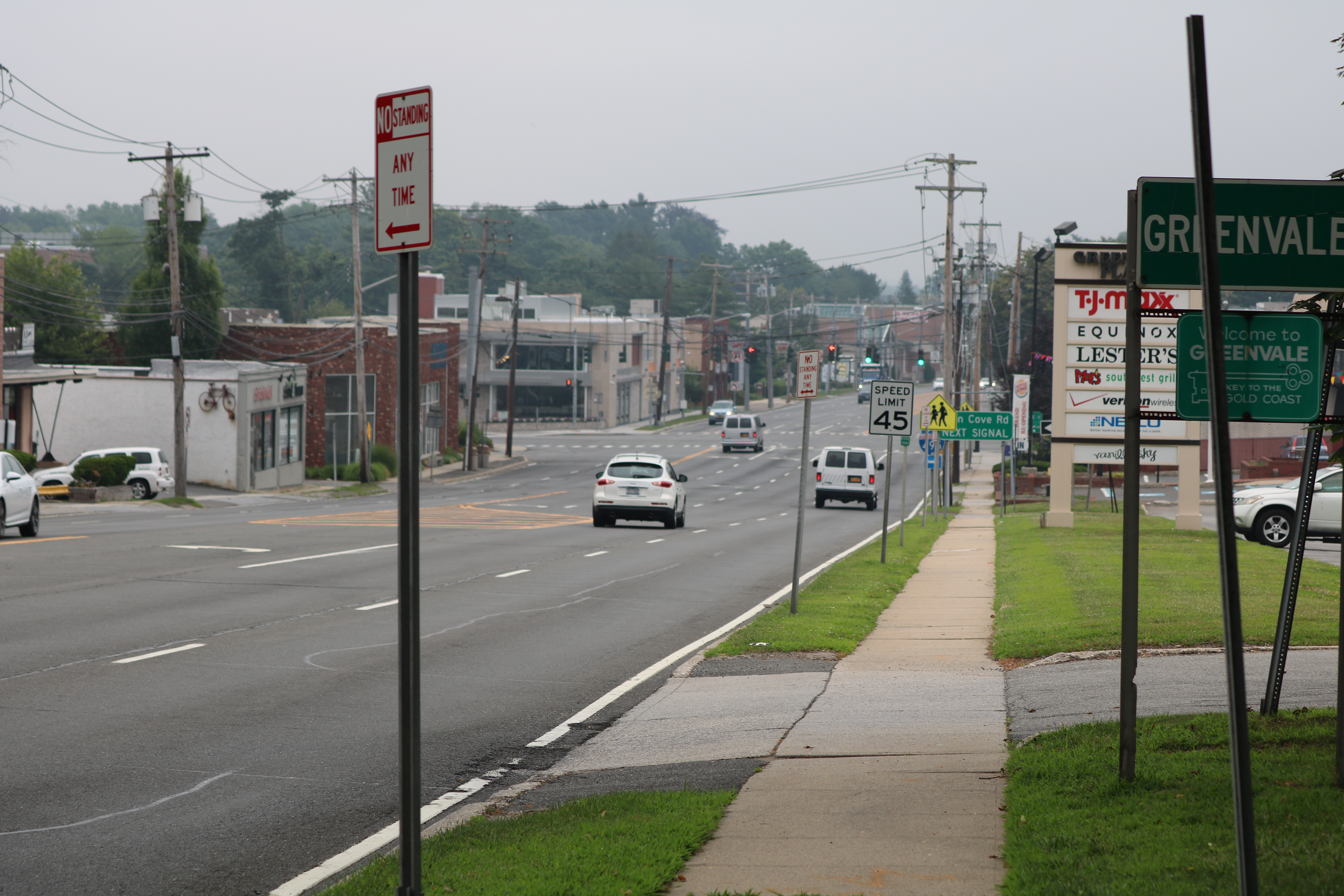
Northern Boulevard in Greenvale, as seen from Town Path in 2018

One state-owned road travels through (and directly serves) Greenvale: Northern Boulevard (New York State Route 25A).

Other major roads which are located within the hamlet include Glen Cove Road (CR 1) and Town Path.

==== Rail ====
The Greenvale station on the Long Island Rail Road's Oyster Bay Branch is partially located within the hamlet; the station is located directly on the Greenvale–Roslyn Harbor border.

==== Bus ====
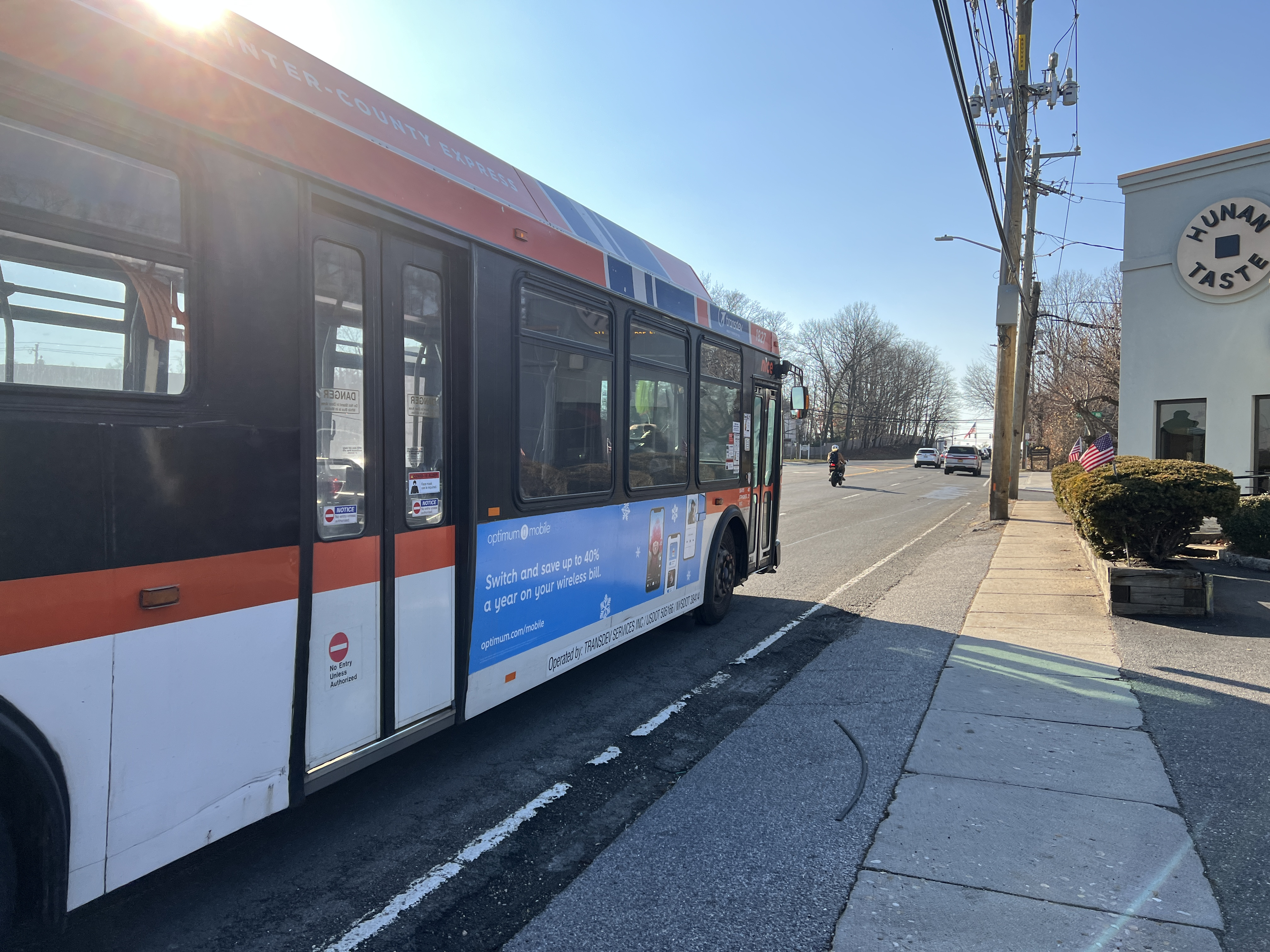
A Great Neck station-bound n20H bus on Northern Boulevard in Greenvale in 2021

Greenvale is served by the n20H and n27 bus routes, which are operated by Nassau Inter-County Express (NICE). The n20H travels west-east along Northern Boulevard, while the n27 travels north-south along Glen Cove Road.

=== Utility services ===
==== Natural gas ====
National Grid provides natural gas to all homes and businesses that are hooked up to natural gas lines in Greenvale.

==== Power ====
PSEG Long Island provides power to all homes and businesses within Greenvale, on behalf of the Long Island Power Authority.

==== Sewage ====
Greenvale is not connected to a sanitary sewer system. As such, all homes and businesses in Greenvale rely on cesspools and septic systems.

==== Trash collection ====
Trash collection services in Greenvale are provided by Meadow Carting, on behalf of the Roslyn Garbage District. The hamlet – in its entirety – is located within the boundaries of (and is thus served by) this special district.

==== Water ====
Greenvale is located within the boundaries of (and is thus served by) the Jericho Water District and the Roslyn Water District. The Jericho Water District serves the portions of the hamlet located within the Town of Oyster Bay, while the Roslyn Water District serves the portions within the Town of North Hempstead.

== Landmarks ==
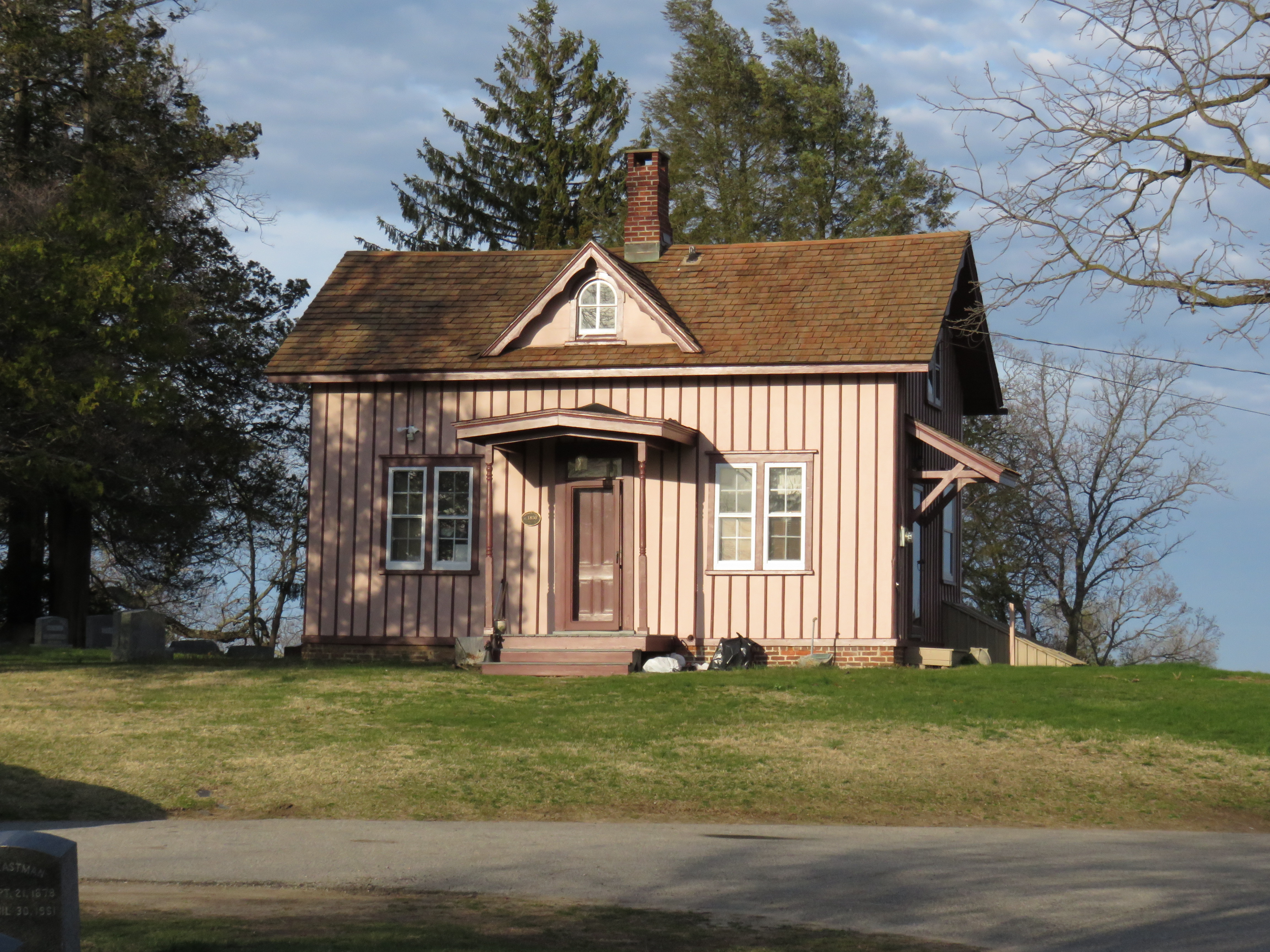
The Roslyn East Gate Toll House in 2016

Greenvale is the site of the historic Roslyn East Gate Toll House, a former toll house for the North Hempstead Turnpike, which has been listed on the National Register of Historic Places since August 16, 1977.

Furthermore, the historic Roslyn Cemetery is also located within the hamlet, and itself is listed on the National Register of Historic Places; the Roslyn East Gate Toll House is located within this cemetery.

== Notable people ==
- Michael Grunwald – Writer and journalist; raised in Greenvale.

== See also ==
- List of Census-designated places in New York
- Glenwood Landing, New York – Another nearby hamlet and Census-designated place (CDP) split between North Hempstead and Oyster Bay.
