= County Route 8 (Nassau County, New York) =

County road in Nassau County, New York, US

- CR 8 highlighted in red

Route information
- Maintained by NCDPW
- Length: 5.00 mi (8.05 km)
- Existed: 1959–present

Location
- Country: United States
- State: New York
- County: Nassau

Highway system
- County routes in New York; County Routes in Nassau County

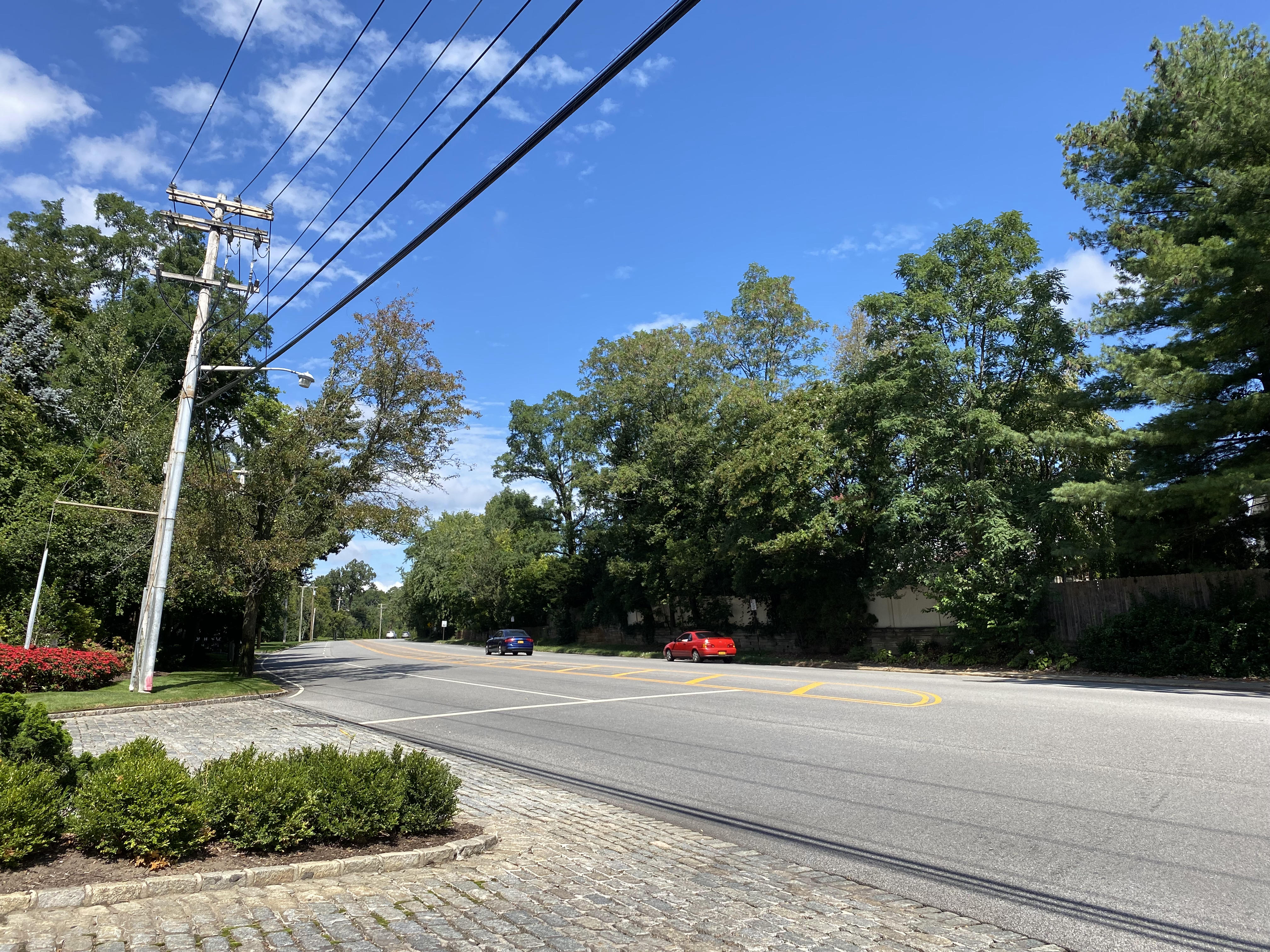
Shelter Rock Road, as seen from Links Drive in 2021

Nassau County Route 8 is an unsigned county road in Nassau County, New York. It travels between Old Country Road (CR 25) and Rockaway Avenue (CR E06) in Garden City and Northern Boulevard (NY 25A) in Manhasset.

CR 8 travels along Herricks Road and Shelter Rock Road, is roughly five miles (8.0 km) in length, and is maintained in its entirety by the Nassau County Department of Public Works.

== Route description ==
=== Southern segment (Herricks Road) ===
The route starts as Herricks Road at the intersection of Old Country Road (CR 25) and Rockaway Avenue (CR E06) in the Incorporated Village of Garden City (located within the Town of Hempstead). From there, it continues north underneath the Main Line of the Long Island Rail Road, entering into the Town of North Hempstead. From the railroad tracks, it continues north to Jericho Turnpike (NY 25), forming the boundary between the unincorporated hamlet of Garden City Park to the west and the Incorporated Village of Mineola to the east. Continuing north from Jericho Turnpike, County Route 8 continues north to Hillside Avenue (NY 25B), still as Herricks Road and forming the border between the two communities. North of Hillside Avenue, Herricks Road enters into the unincorporated hamlet of Herricks, and continues north through the hamlet to its intersection with Searingtown Road (CR 101) and Shelter Rock Road, where Herricks Road ends. At this intersection, the alignment of County Route 8 turns west onto Shelter Rock Road.

=== Northern segment (Shelter Rock Road) ===
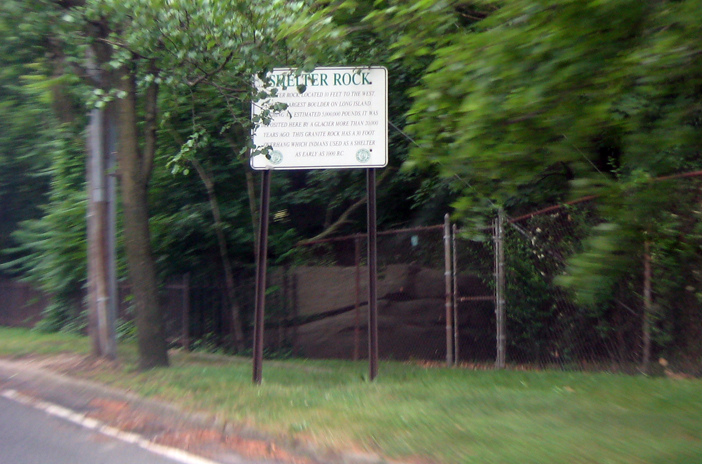
Shelter Rock, seen from Shelter Rock Road

From the intersection with Herricks Road, Searingtown Road (CR 101), and Shelter Rock Road, Nassau County Route 8 follows Shelter Rock Road west and north through Herricks, passing Herricks High School and forming the border between Herricks and unincorporated Manhasset Hills, as well as some of the Herricks–North Hills village border. It continues north to I.U. Willets Road, entering completely into the Incorporated Village of North Hills. Continuing north, Shelter Rock Road crosses over the Northern State Parkway and then the Long Island Expressway (Interstate 495). It then continues north through North Hills and then straddling the North Hills–Manhasset border, passing the historic Shelter Rock (for which the road is named), and ending just over the North Hills–Manhasset border at Northern Boulevard (NY 25A). Additionally, when in use, the Long Island Motor Parkway crossed Shelter Rock Road.

In the early 1960s, Shelter Rock Road's alignment was straightened and modernized through its northern stretch; remaining portions of the old alignment are now known as Old Shelter Rock Road.

CR 8's former route shield; all Nassau County routes have been unsigned since the 1970s.

== Major intersections ==
Location	mi	km	Destinations	Notes
Garden City–Mineola line	0.0	0.0	Rockaway Avenue (CR E06)	Roadway continues as Old Country Road
Garden City Park–Mineola line	0.6	0.97	NY 25 (Jericho Turnpike)	At-grade intersection
Garden City Park–Herricks– Williston Park–Mineola quadripoint	1.2	1.9	NY 25B (Hillside Avenue)	At-grade intersection
Manhasset Hills–Searingtown line	2.17	3.49	Old Courthouse Road	
North Hills	2.65	4.26	I.U. Willets Road	
North Hills	3.1	5.0	Northern State Parkway – Hauppauge, New York	Exit 27 N-S on Northern State Parkway
North Hills	3.2	5.1	I-495 – Riverhead, New York	Exit 35 on I-495 eastbound, Exit 36 on I-495 westbound
Manhasset	5.0	8.0	NY 25A (Northern Boulevard)	At-grade intersection
1.000 mi = 1.609 km; 1.000 km = 0.621 mi

== 1982 Herricks Road train crash ==
On March 14, 1982, a Long Island Rail Road passenger train struck a van with 10 teenagers inside at the former Herricks Road grade crossing at 2:18 AM, killing the 19-year-old driver and 8 of the 9 passengers, while leaving the lone surviving van passenger in critical condition. The teenagers were attempting to beat the train and drove around the lowered gates when the train struck their van. The van passenger that survived the accident was the daughter of State Senator John D. Caemmerer. The National Transportation Safety Board labeled the Herricks Road grade crossing as being the most hazardous in the United States, what with an average of 20,000 cars and 200 trains traversing the grade crossing daily.

Following the crash, the grade crossing at Herricks Road was eliminated. An underpass was constructed to allow CR 8 to travel underneath the Long Island Rail Road's Main Line instead of intersecting it at-grade. The bridge carrying the tracks over Herricks Road opened on April 28, 1998, after 5 years of construction.

== See also ==
- List of county routes in Nassau County, New York
