= Port Washington Water District =

Public water utility district on Long Island, New York

- Official seal

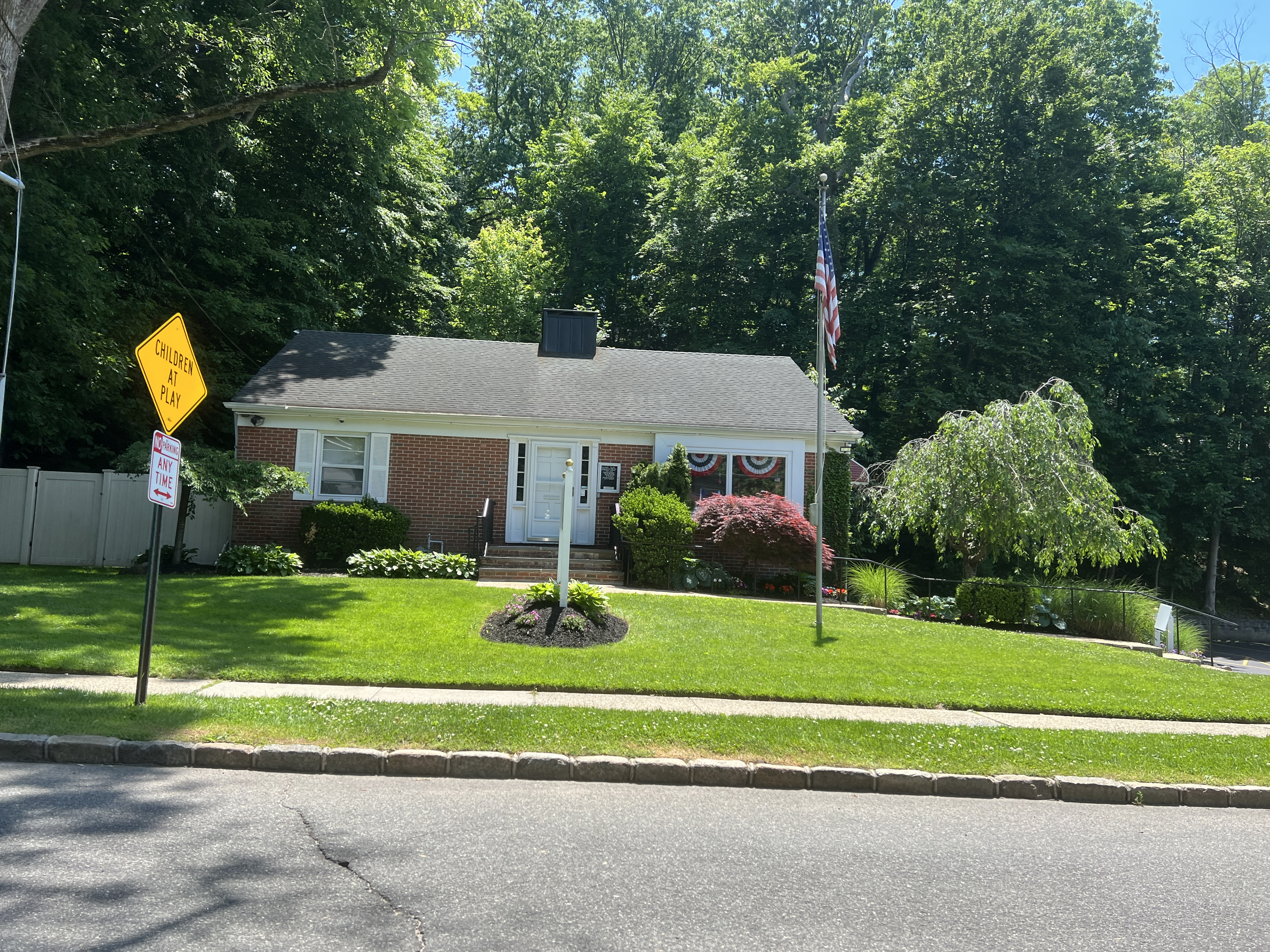
- The Port Washington Water District's headquarters in Baxter Estates, seen in 2022

Water district overview
- Formed: 1913
- Headquarters: 38 Sandy Hollow Road, Port Washington, NY 11050; Village of Baxter Estates
- Website: pwwd.org

The Port Washington Water District is a public water utility district in Nassau County, on Long Island, in New York, United States.

== Description ==
The Port Washington Water District was established in 1913, and serves large portions of the Cow Neck (Port Washington) Peninsula. As of 2019, the district serves over 30,000 residents and businesses throughout the Greater Port Washington area.

=== Communities served ===
The Port Washington Water District serves the following communities:

- Baxter Estates
- Flower Hill (part, with the Manhasset–Lakeville Water District and the Roslyn Water District)
- Manorhaven
- Plandome Manor (part, with the Manhasset–Lakeville Water District)
- Port Washington (part, with the Roslyn Water District)
- Port Washington North

== History ==
The Port Washington Water District was established in 1913.

In the mid-20th century, as the community's population and development grew, the Port Washington Water District needed to construct more wells to serve the growing community. Due to its location on Cow Neck, the district needed to take potential saltwater intrusion risks into consideration. This spurred the district to construct new pumping facilities at Christopher Morley Park in the Village of North Hills – located south of the district's boundaries and further inland – in the 1960s. By constructing the new wells at this more inland location and linking them to the district's distribution system via a new pipeline, the Port Washington Water District would be able to significantly boost capacity while mitigating the risk of saltwater intrusion, with the bulk of capacity being provided by them instead of the existing facilities on the peninsula. By the 2020s, the Morley Park Wells provided roughly two-thirds of the district's total water supply.

In the early 1980s, due to the proximity of three existing wells to the Town of North Hempstead's Port Washington Landfill, the Port Washington Water District constructed the Stonytown Road Well at the Flower Hill Park in the Village of Flower Hill, at the corner of Stonytown Road and Port Washington Boulevard. This facility would be reconstructed in the 2020s.

In 2018, the district completed the current Beacon Hill Water Tower, through a capital project that replaced the original structure, which had reached the end of its useful life.

== Administration ==
The Port Washington Water District is governed by a board of commissioners and a superintendent. The Board of Commissioners consists of three elected water commissioners – one of whom serves as the chairperson, another who serves as Secretary, and a third who serves as Treasurer.

As of December 2025, the Water Commissioners of the Port Washington Water District are David R. Brackett (the District Chairman), Peter Meyer (the District Secretary), and Mindy Germain (the District Treasurer). Furthermore, the District Superintendent is Paul Prignano.

== See also ==
- Special districts in New York (state)
- Port Washington Water Pollution Control District
- Port Washington Police District
