= Roslyn Water District =

Public water utility district on Long Island, New York

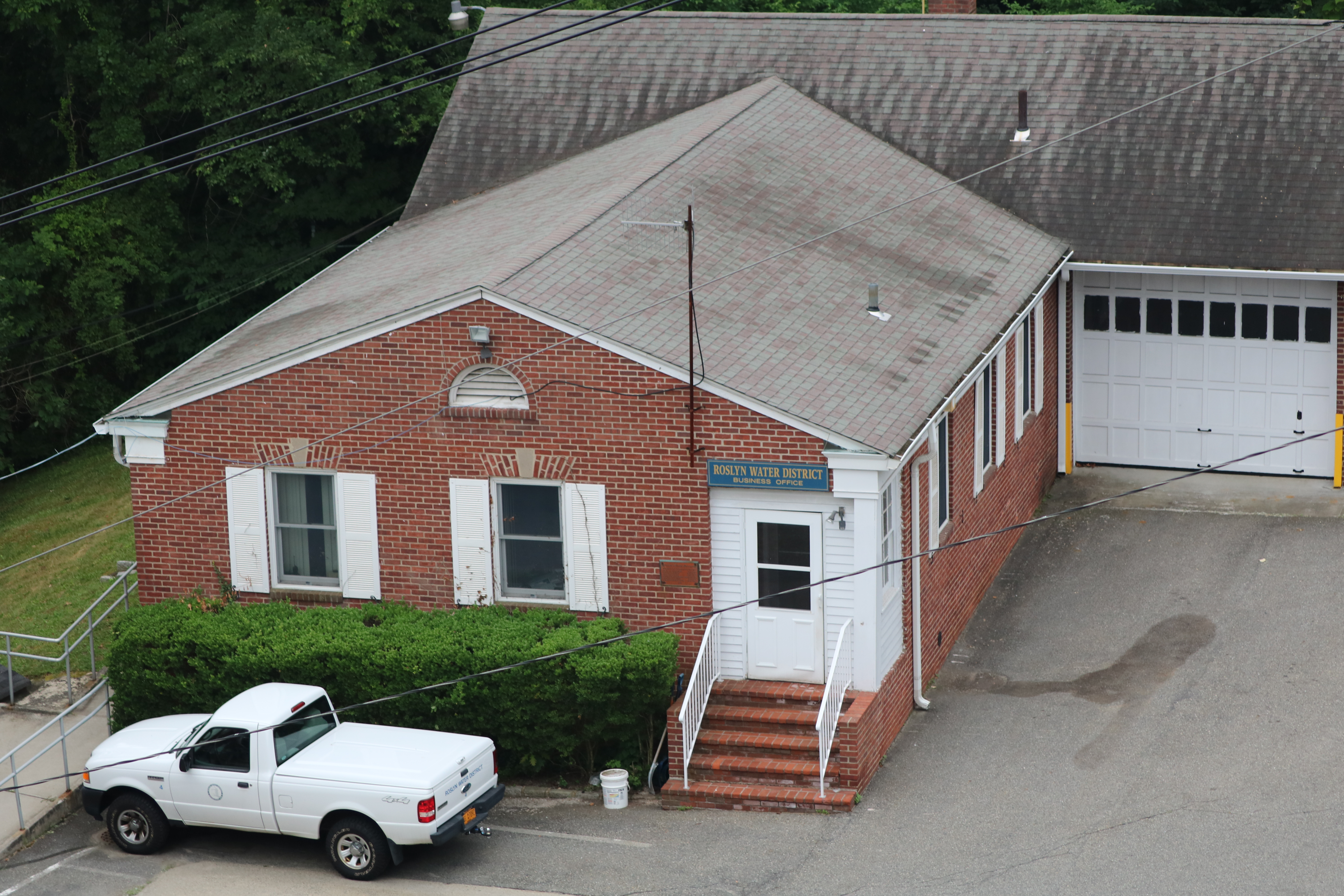
- The Roslyn Water District's business office on West Shore Road in the Village of Roslyn

Water district overview
- Formed: 1910
- Headquarters: 24 West Shore Road, Roslyn, NY 11576
- Website: www.roslynwaterdistrict.org

The Roslyn Water District is a public water utility district in Nassau County, on Long Island, in New York, United States.

== History ==
The Roslyn Water District was established in 1910.

== Communities served ==
The Roslyn Water District serves the following communities:

- Albertson (part, with the Albertson Water District)
- East Hills (part, with Jericho Water District)
- Flower Hill (part, with the Manhasset–Lakeville Water District and the Port Washington Water District)
- Greenvale (part, with the Jericho Water District)
- North Hills (part, with the Albertson Water District, the Garden City Park Water District, and the Manhasset–Lakeville Water District)
- Old Westbury (part, with the Village of Old Westbury's water system)
- Port Washington (part, with Port Washington Water District)
- Roslyn
- Roslyn Estates
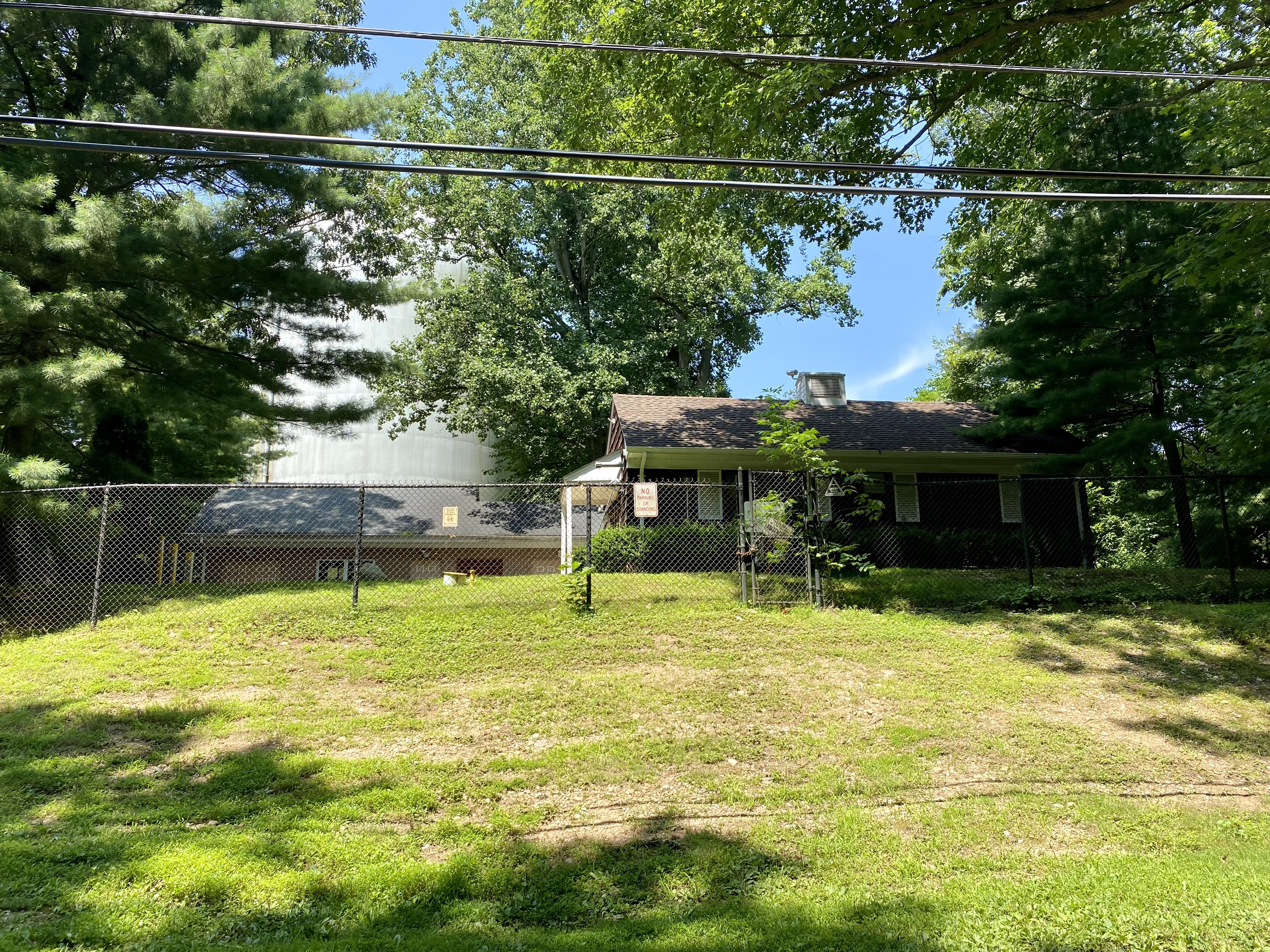
  The Roslyn Water District's Dianas Trail Well in Roslyn Estates in July 2021
- Roslyn Harbor (part, with the Glenwood Water District and the Jericho Water District)
- Roslyn Heights (part, with the Albertson Water District)

The Roslyn Water District also sells the Glenwood Water District with its water (as that district lacks its own wells), along with some water to the Albertson Water District.

== Statistics ==
- Number of wells: 8
- Service area: approximately 5.1 miles (8.2 km)
- Pipe network length: approximately 93 miles (150 km)

== Interconnections ==
The Roslyn Water District has 10 interconnections with neighboring districts.

== See also ==
- Mackay Estate Water Tower
