= Country Estates, Inc. =

American real estate development company

Country Estates, Inc. was a 20th century American real estate development company. It developed many luxury housing developments on Long Island, New York and in South Florida.

== History ==
Country Estates, Inc. was founded by Harry and Seymour Schwartz. The firm first began building developments in the Five Towns area of Long Island in the 1940s. In 1952, the firm developed a roughly 110-acre development called Delray Garden Estates in Delray Beach, Florida.

In the mid-1950s, the firm began developing Roslyn Hills Country Estates (also known as Country Estates at East Hills) over Harbor Hill, the former estate of Clarence Mackay, in East Hills, New York. One home model in Roslyn Hills Country Estates, "The Influential," was cited as being the first circular luxury home model on the market and was protected by copyright. The model – like most others in the Country Estates developments – was designed by architect Michael L. Radoslovich.

== Developments ==
- Hewlett Crest Park (in Hewlett, New York)
- Country Estates at Port Washington (in Port Washington, New York)
- Country Estates at Kings Point & Country Estates II at Kings Point (in Kings Point, New York)
- Delray Garden Estates (also known as Palm Beach Country Estates; in Delray Beach, Florida)
- East Norwich Country Estates (in East Norwich, New York)
- Flower Hill Country Estates (in Flower Hill, New York)
- Roslyn Hills Country Estates (also known as Roslyn Country Estates and Country Estates at East Hills; in East Hills, New York)

== See also ==
- Brookfield Properties
- Levitt & Sons
