= East Hills, New York =

- Village
- Incorporated Village of East Hills
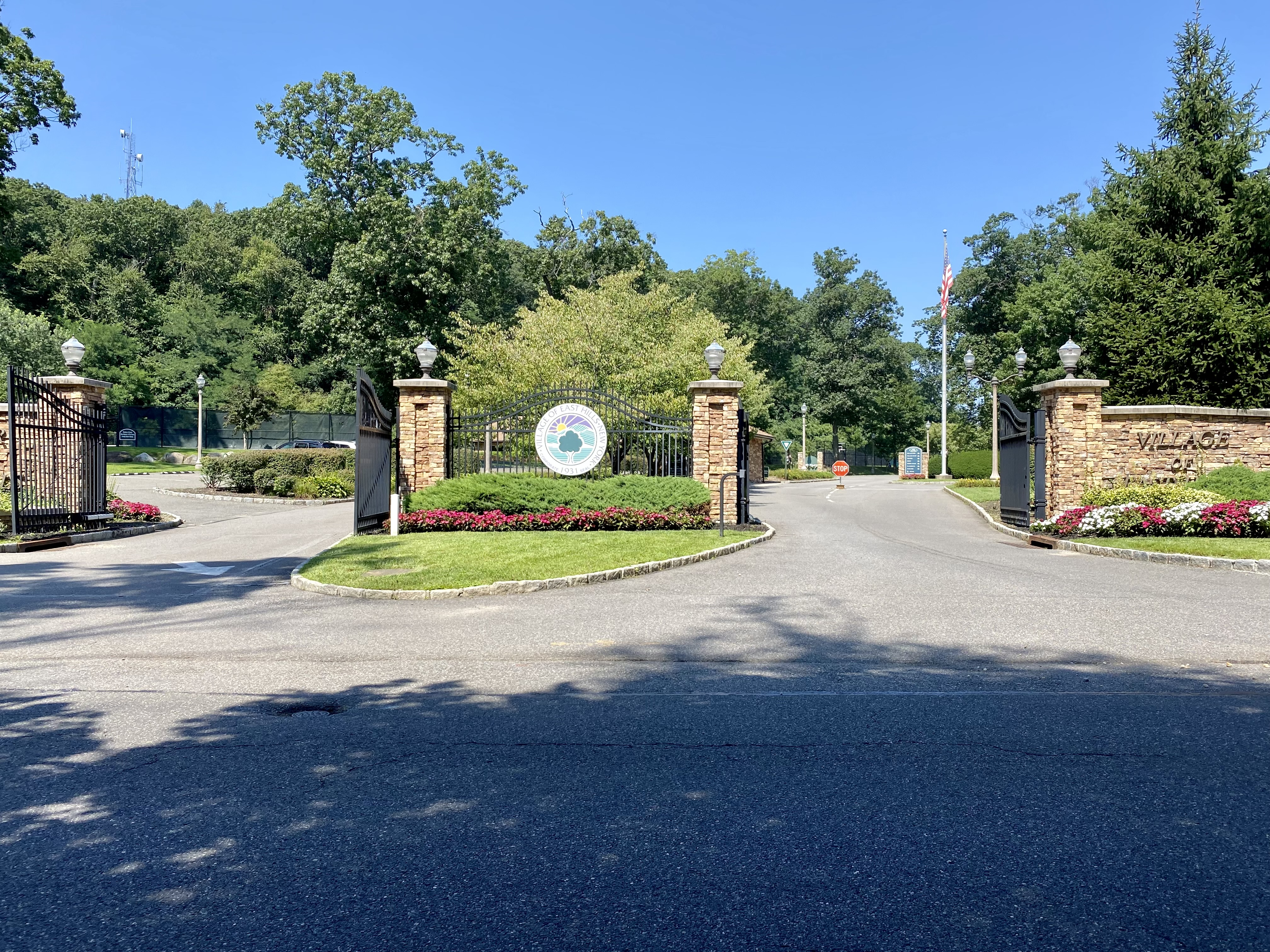
- The entrance to the Park at East Hills in 2021

- Official seal
- Nickname(s): E. Hills; VEH
- Motto: "Like No Other!"
- Location in Nassau County and the state of New York

- Location on Long Island Location within the state of New York
- Coordinates: 40°47′39″N 73°37′37″W
- Country: United States
- State: New York
- County: Nassau
- Towns: North Hempstead; Oyster Bay
- Incorporated: June 24, 1931
- Named for: Its hilly location immediately east of Roslyn

Government
  - Mayor: Brian Meyerson
  - Deputy Mayor: Emmanuel Zuckerman

Area
  - Total: 2.28 sq mi (5.90 km^{2})
  - Land: 2.28 sq mi (5.90 km^{2})
  - Water: 0 sq mi (0.00 km^{2})
- Elevation: 187 ft (57 m)

Population (2020)
  - Total: 7,284
  - Density: 3,195.8/sq mi (1,233.91/km^{2})
- Demonym(s): East Hillsian; Roslynian; Roslynite
- Time zone: UTC−5 (Eastern (EST))
  - Summer (DST): UTC−4 (EDT)
- ZIP Codes: 11548 (Greenvale); 11576 (Roslyn); 11577 (Roslyn Heights)
- Area codes: 516, 363
- FIPS code: 36-22260
- GNIS feature ID: 0949124
- Website: www.villageofeasthills.org

East Hills is a village in Nassau County, on the North Shore of Long Island, in New York, United States. It is considered part of the Greater Roslyn area, which is anchored by the Incorporated Village of Roslyn. The population was 7,284 at the time of the 2020 census.

The Incorporated Village of East Hills is located primarily within the Town of North Hempstead – except for a small section of the village's northeastern corner, which is located within the Town of Oyster Bay.

== History ==
=== Before the village ===
In 1643, John Carman and Robert Fordham sailed across the Long Island Sound from Stamford, Connecticut and purchased the land now occupied by the towns of Hempstead and North Hempstead from the Native Americans. This land included what is now East Hills, which at the time was inhabited by the Matinecock Native Americans. Dutch and English colonists began to settle the area during the remainder of the 17th century.

For a long time, much of what now is East Hills was home to a few wealthy families. In 1898, Clarence and Katherine Mackay settled in present-day East Hills and would eventually commission Stanford White to design their mansion, Harbor Hill. In 1924, the Prince of Wales, who later abdicated the throne of England to marry Mrs. Simpson, was entertained at the Mackay estate. Aviation pioneer Charles A. Lindbergh rested at the Mackay estate in 1927 after returning to the United States following his historic solo flight to Paris, France.

=== Village of East Hills (1931 – present) ===
The Village of East Hills was incorporated on June 24, 1931, and its first election was held a couple weeks later on July 8 in barns at the Mackay estate. Reasons for incorporating included the desire by many locals to be excluded from paying taxes for public improvements like sanitary sewer systems and highways, the desires to keep businesses out and to not be part of the Roslyn Sewer District, and to maintain local control through municipal home rule powers. Many of the proposals opposed by the locals were originally announced when Roslyn first wanted to incorporate as a village, as early plans called for that village's proposed boundaries to include what would become East Hills. As a result, the residents decided to incorporate East Hills as a separate village.

Willets was elected as Mayor and John Mackay, Stephen Willets, Ellen A. Hennessy, and Catherine Hechler were elected as Village Trustees. Charles Hechler – the husband of Catherine Hechler – was appointed as the Village Clerk.

The post-war era ushered in a huge population boom and suburbanization throughout the United States, which led to the construction of many new developments in the Village of East Hills. One of these developments, Strathmore, was developed by Levitt & Sons in the late 1940s. Another large-scale development built during this time, the Country Estates subdivision, was developed by Country Estates, Inc., over Clarence Mackay's former estate. Prior to building the Country Estates in East Hills, the firm developed the Flower Hill Country Estates development in nearby Flower Hill. A third notable development, Norgate, was developed by Gustav A. Mezger & Co. The 175-home Lakeville Estates subdivision – another major development built about this time – was developed by Klein & Teicholz.

Additionally, in order for the Roslyn Union Free School District to adequately serve the influx of families, the Moore & Hutchins-designed East Hills Elementary School was opened between the Canterbury Woods and Fairfield Park developments in 1953.

In 1949, the boundaries of East Hills were expanded when it annexed all of its present territory located south of the present-day Long Island Expressway. This territory – bounded by Roslyn Road to the west, Glen Cove Road to the east, the present-day Long Island Expressway to the north, and the Northern State Parkway to the south – had previously been part of the adjacent Village of Old Westbury, and was annexed by East Hills. Upon the transfer, policing of newly-acquired territory automatically switched that April from Old Westbury's municipal police department to the Nassau County Police Department.

In 1951, Temple Beth Sholom – located near the southwestern corner of the village – was established. The first portion of its building, designed by Percival Goodman, opened the following year.

On Labor Day 2006, the Park at East Hills opened on the land previously occupied by the Roslyn Air National Guard Station. It has a pool, playground, dog park, theater, nature paths, senior facilities, fitness facilities, a baseball field, and tennis, pickleball, and basketball courts. It is also the location of the present East Hills Village Hall; the prior facility on Town Path was subsequently sold, demolished, and redeveloped as single-family housing after the move was complete. The construction of the park was financed through the sale of bonds; carrying and operating costs are paid through taxes.

=== Etymology ===
The name of East Hills was chosen based on its geography and location. The "East" reflects the village's geographic location adjacent to and east of Roslyn, and the "Hills" reflects the hilly geography of the village.

== Geography ==
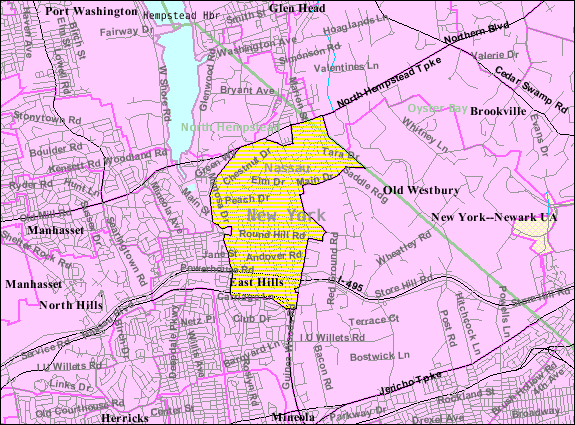
U.S. Census map of East Hills

According to the United States Census Bureau, the village has a total area of 2.28 square miles (5.9 km^{2}), all land.

In the late 1940s, between the 1940 census and the 1950 census, the village gained territory from adjacent Old Westbury, comprising all of East Hills' present territory south of the Long Island Expressway.

The village also gained 16 acres (6.5 ha) territory from the adjacent Incorporated Village of Brookville between the 1960 census and the 1970 census; this small area comprises the portion of the village located within the Town of Oyster Bay.

=== Topography ===
The portions of the village on Harbor Hill, the former site of Clarence Mackay's eponymous estate, are among the highest areas in Nassau County – in addition to being among of the highest on Long Island, as a whole.

Additionally, the Harbor Hill Moraine is named for this hill, due to it being one of this terminal moraine's most prominent and best-known topographic and geographical features.

=== Climate ===
The Village of East Hills features a humid subtropical climate (Cfa) under the Köppen climate classification. As such, the village experiences hot, humid summers and cold winters, and experiences precipitation throughout the entirety of the year.

Climate data for East Hills, New York, 1991–2020 normals, extremes 1999–present
Month	Jan	Feb	Mar	Apr	May	Jun	Jul	Aug	Sep	Oct	Nov	Dec	Year
Record high °F (°C)	71 (22)	73 (23)	87 (31)	94 (34)	97 (36)	101 (38)	108 (42)	105 (41)	97 (36)	89 (32)	83 (28)	76 (24)	108 (42)
Mean daily maximum °F (°C)	40.4 (4.7)	42.9 (6.1)	51.1 (10.6)	61.2 (16.2)	70.6 (21.4)	79.6 (26.4)	84.5 (29.2)	83.3 (28.5)	76.0 (24.4)	65.4 (18.6)	55.7 (13.2)	45.1 (7.3)	63.0 (17.2)
Daily mean °F (°C)	33.4 (0.8)	35.0 (1.7)	42.0 (5.6)	51.8 (11.0)	60.8 (16.0)	70.1 (21.2)	75.2 (24.0)	74.1 (23.4)	67.2 (19.6)	56.5 (13.6)	47.8 (8.8)	38.2 (3.4)	54.3 (12.4)
Mean daily minimum °F (°C)	26.4 (−3.1)	27.1 (−2.7)	33.5 (0.8)	42.4 (5.8)	51.0 (10.6)	60.6 (15.9)	65.8 (18.8)	65.0 (18.3)	58.3 (14.6)	47.6 (8.7)	39.9 (4.4)	31.2 (−0.4)	45.7 (7.6)
Record low °F (°C)	−4 (−20)	−5 (−21)	5 (−15)	13 (−11)	34 (1)	43 (6)	50 (10)	46 (8)	36 (2)	27 (−3)	17 (−8)	−2 (−19)	−5 (−21)
Average precipitation inches (mm)	3.56 (90)	2.87 (73)	4.47 (114)	3.85 (98)	3.23 (82)	3.54 (90)	3.97 (101)	4.26 (108)	4.31 (109)	4.08 (104)	3.18 (81)	3.99 (101)	45.31 (1,151)
Average snowfall inches (cm)	5.5 (14)	7.8 (20)	3.7 (9.4)	0.3 (0.76)	0 (0)	0 (0)	0 (0)	0 (0)	0 (0)	0 (0)	0.2 (0.51)	5.7 (14)	23.2 (58.67)
Average relative humidity (%)	73	75	72	72	75	74	73	71	73	73	71	75	73
Mean monthly sunshine hours	177	153	172	167	202	213	237	241	215	190	210	171	2,348
Mean daily daylight hours	9.6	10.7	12.0	13.3	14.5	15.1	14.8	13.8	12.5	11.1	9.9	9.3	12.2
Average ultraviolet index	2	2	2	3	5	6	6	6	5	3	2	2	4
Source: NOAA; Weather Atlas

== Demographics ==
Historical population
Census	Pop.	Note	%±
1940	343		—
1950	2,547		642.6%
1960	7,184		182.1%
1970	8,624		20.0%
1980	7,160		−17.0%
1990	6,746		−5.8%
2000	6,842		1.4%
2010	6,955		1.7%
2020	7,284		4.7%
U.S. Decennial Census

=== Racial and ethnic composition ===
East Hills village, New York – Racial and ethnic composition Note: the US Census treats Hispanic/Latino as an ethnic category. This table excludes Latinos from the racial categories and assigns them to a separate category. Hispanics/Latinos may be of any race.
Race / Ethnicity (NH = Non-Hispanic)	Pop 2000	Pop 2010	Pop 2020	% 2000	% 2010	% 2020
White alone (NH)	6,288	6,140	5,808	91.90%	88.28%	79.74%
Black or African American alone (NH)	53	66	85	0.77%	0.95%	1.17%
Native American or Alaska Native alone (NH)	0	0	1	0.00%	0.00%	0.01%
Asian alone (NH)	330	513	888	4.82%	7.38%	12.19%
Native Hawaiian or Pacific Islander alone (NH)	1	0	0	0.01%	0.00%	0.00%
Other race alone (NH)	20	4	33	0.29%	0.06%	0.45%
Mixed race or Multiracial (NH)	49	76	166	0.72%	1.09%	2.28%
Hispanic or Latino (any race)	101	156	303	1.48%	2.24%	4.16%
Total	6,842	6,955	7,284	100.00%	100.00%	100.00%

=== 2020 census ===
As of the 2020 census, East Hills had a population of 7,284. The median age was 41.0 years. 27.6% of residents were under the age of 18 and 17.2% of residents were 65 years of age or older. For every 100 females there were 97.2 males, and for every 100 females age 18 and over there were 94.0 males age 18 and over.

100.0% of residents lived in urban areas, while 0.0% lived in rural areas.

There were 2,218 households in East Hills, of which 46.1% had children under the age of 18 living in them. Of all households, 80.1% were married-couple households, 5.9% were households with a male householder and no spouse or partner present, and 12.8% were households with a female householder and no spouse or partner present. About 9.0% of all households were made up of individuals and 6.4% had someone living alone who was 65 years of age or older.

There were 2,294 housing units, of which 3.3% were vacant. The homeowner vacancy rate was 1.0% and the rental vacancy rate was 20.7%.

=== 2010 census ===
As of the census of 2010, there were 6,955 people residing in the village. The racial makeup of the village was 89.85% White, 0.95% African American, 7.40% Asian, 0.49% from other races, and 1.31% from two or more races. Hispanic or Latino of any race were 2.24% of the population.

=== 2000 census ===
As of the census of 2000, there were 6,842 people, 2,245 households, and 2,029 families residing in the village. The population density was 2,991.5 inhabitants per square mile (1,155.0/km^{2}). There were 2,275 housing units at an average density of 994.7 per square mile (384.1/km^{2}). The racial makeup of the village was 92.94% White, 0.8% African American, 0.01% Native American, 4.82% Asian, 0.01% Pacific Islander, 0.57% from other races, and 0.83% from two or more races. Hispanic or Latino of any race were 1.48% of the population.

There were 2,245 households, out of which 46.2% had children under the age of 18 living with them, 84.4% were married couples living together, 4.9% had a female householder with no husband present, and 9.6% were non-families. 8.5% of all households were made up of individuals, and 5.4% had someone living alone who was 65 years of age or older. The average household size was 3.04 and the average family size was 3.2.

In the village, the population was spread out, with 29.9% under the age of 18, 3.9% from 18 to 24, 23.2% from 25 to 44, 28.6% from 45 to 64, and 14.4% who were 65 years of age or older. The median age was 41 years. For every 100 females, there were 97.1 males. For every 100 females age 18 and over, there were 92.6 males.

The median income for a household in the village was $149,726, and the median income for a family was $159,316. Males had a median income of $100,000 versus $52,115 for females. The per capita income for the village was $59,297. About 1.5% of families and 1.6% of the population were below the poverty line, including 1.1% of those under age 18 and 3.0% of those age 65 or over.

== Government ==
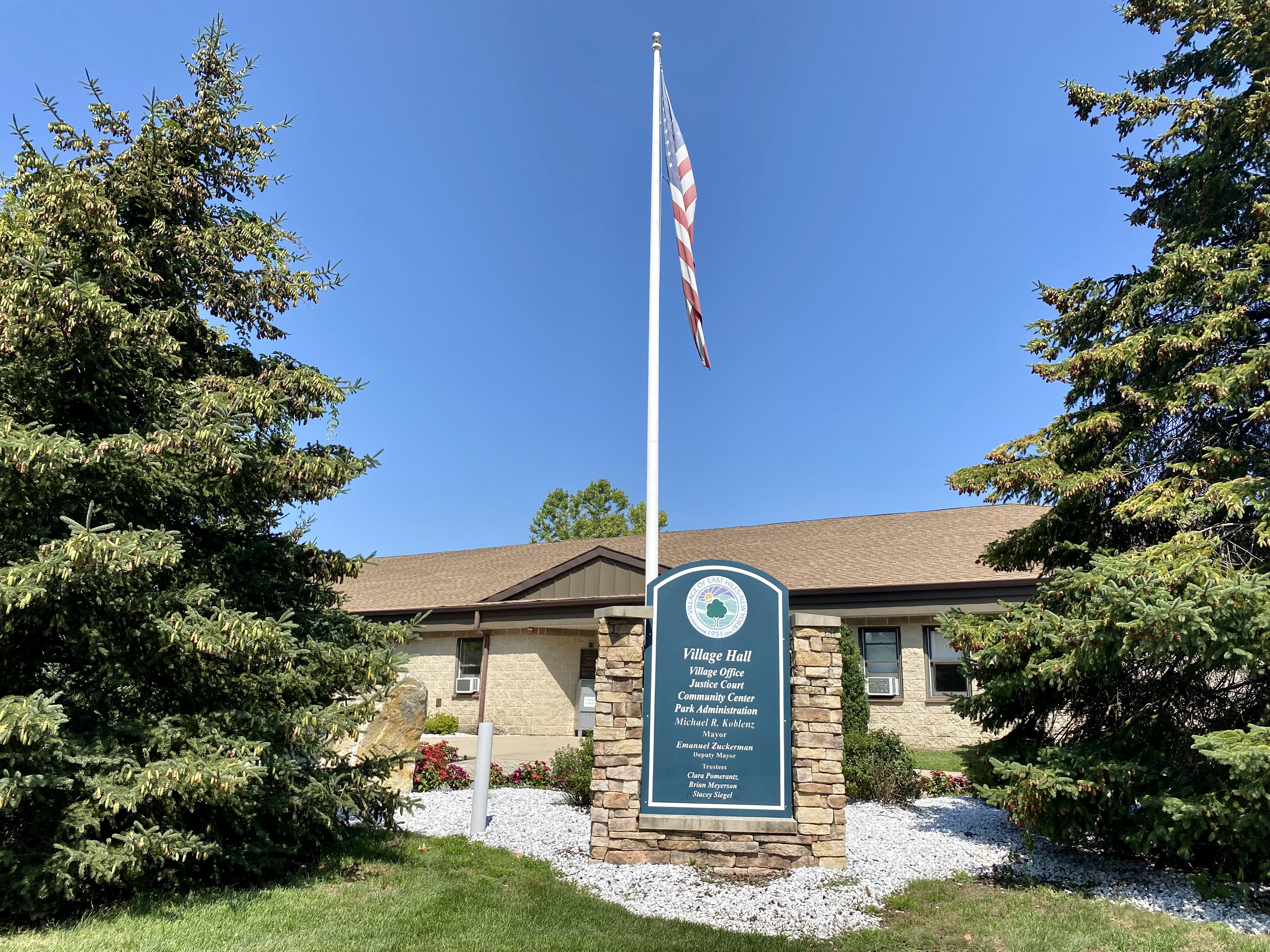
East Hills Village Hall in 2021

=== Village government ===
The Village of East Hills is governed by the six-member Village of East Hills Board of Trustees, consisting of an elected mayor and five elected trustees; one trustee is selected each year to additionally serve as the deputy mayor. All members of the Board of Trustees are elected at-large to serve four-year terms, and board members receive salaries.

As of October 23, 2026, the Mayor of East Hills is Brian Meyerson.

The following is a list of East Hills' mayors, from 1931 to present:

Mayors of East Hills:
Mayor's name	Year(s) in office
Robert H. Willets	1931–1945
William W. Murray Jr.	1945–1952
Raymond E. Dolar	1952–1966
William R. Fleischer	1966–1987
Leonard Nadel	1987–1991
Lawrence Aaronson	1991–1995
Michael R. Koblenz	1995–2026
Brian Meyerson	2026–present

=== Representation in higher government ===
On the town level, the portions of East Hills within the Town of North Hempstead are located within its 2nd council district, which as of April 2026 is represented on the North Hempstead Town Council by Edward W. Scott (R–Albertson).

On the county level, East Hills is located within Nassau County's 18th Legislative district, which as of April 2026 is represented in the Nassau County Legislature by Samantha Goetz (R–Oyster Bay).

On the state level, East Hills is split between the New York State Assembly's 13th and 16th State Assembly districts, and is located entirely within the New York State Senate's 7th State Senate district. As of July 2026, these districts are represented by Charles D. Lavine (D–Glen Cove), Daniel J. Norber (R–Great Neck), and Jack M. Martins (R–Old Westbury), respectively.

On the federal level, East Hills is located in New York's 3rd congressional district, which as of July 2026 is represented by Thomas R. Suozzi (D–Glen Cove). Like the rest of New York, it is represented in the United States Senate by Charles E. Schumer (D) and Kirsten E. Gillibrand (D).

=== Politics ===
In the 2024 U.S. presidential election, the majority of East Hills' voters voted for Kamala D. Harris (D). Harris carried the village with 51.5% of the vote (2,157 votes), while Donald J. Trump (R) received 47.2% (1,976 votes). Third-party and write-in candidates received a total of 1.2% of the vote (52 votes).

== Parks and recreation ==
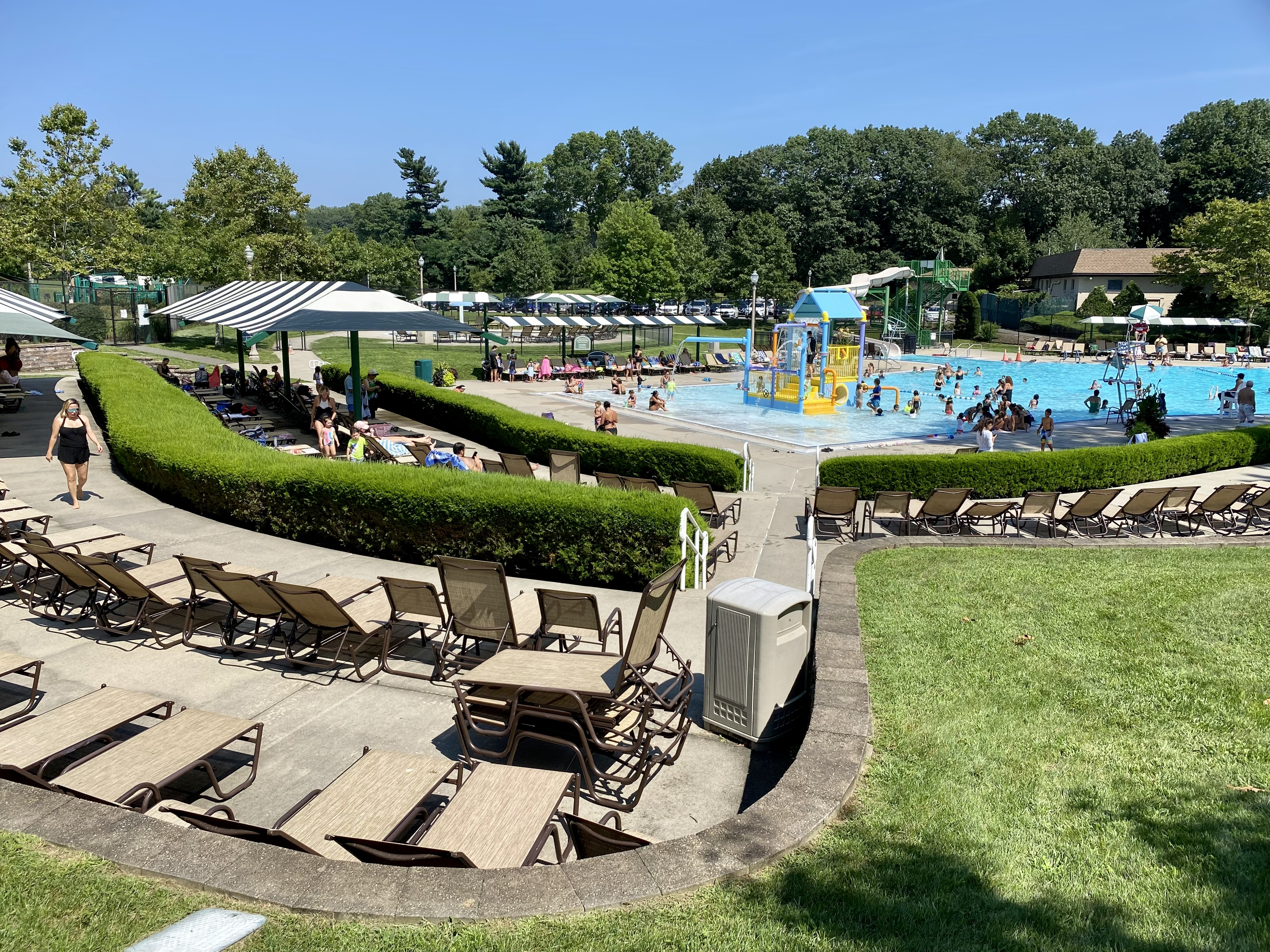
The pool at the Park at East Hills in 2021

- Arlene's Park
- The Park at East Hills

Additionally, the recreation areas at the East Hills and Harbor Hill elementary schools, Roslyn Middle School, St. Mary's Parochial School, and some portions of the recreation areas at Roslyn High School, are located within the village – as well as a few landscaped traffic islands.

== Education ==
=== School districts ===
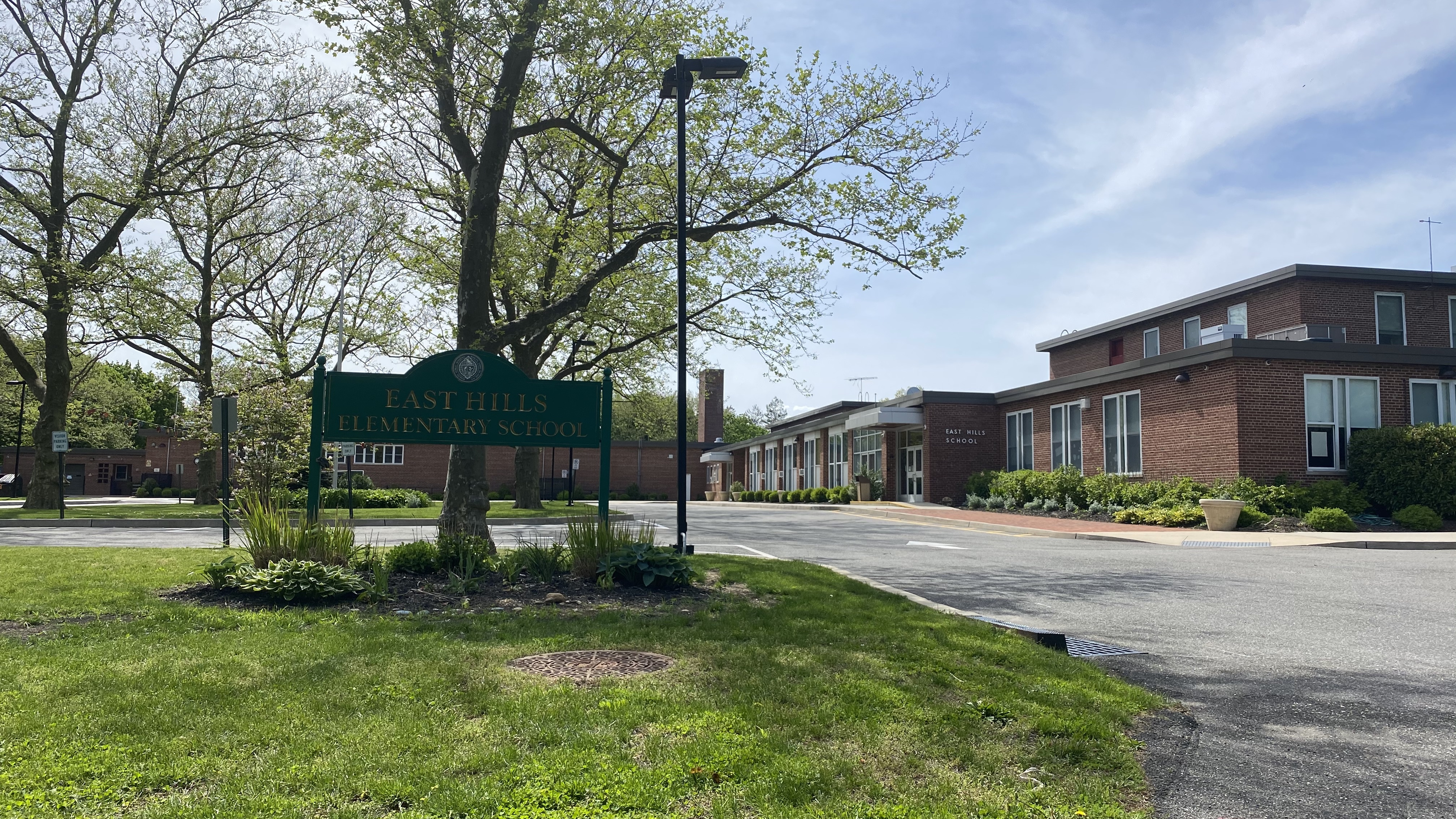
The Roslyn School District's East Hills Elementary School in 2020

East Hills is primarily within the boundaries of (and is thus served by) the Roslyn Union Free School District. However, some of the southeastern portions of the village are served by the East Williston Union Free School District, and the small portion within the Town of Oyster Bay is served by the Jericho Union Free School District. Accordingly, children who live in East Hills and attend public schools will go to school in one of these three districts depending on where they reside within the village.

=== Library districts ===
The majority of East Hills is located within the boundaries of (and is thus served by) a library district. Of those areas of East Hills within a library district, the overwhelming majority is located within the boundaries of Roslyn's library district, which is served by the Bryant Library in Roslyn. The small portion of the village within the Town of Oyster Bay, meanwhile, is located within the Jericho Library District's boundaries and is thus served by the Jericho Public Library in Jericho. The boundaries of these two library districts are coterminous with those of the Roslyn and Jericho school districts, respectively, within the village.

The remainder of the village – specifically, the portions of East Hills located within the East Williston School District, at the southeastern corner of the village – are not within the boundaries of any library district.

== Infrastructure ==
=== Transportation ===
==== Road ====
===== Federal highways =====
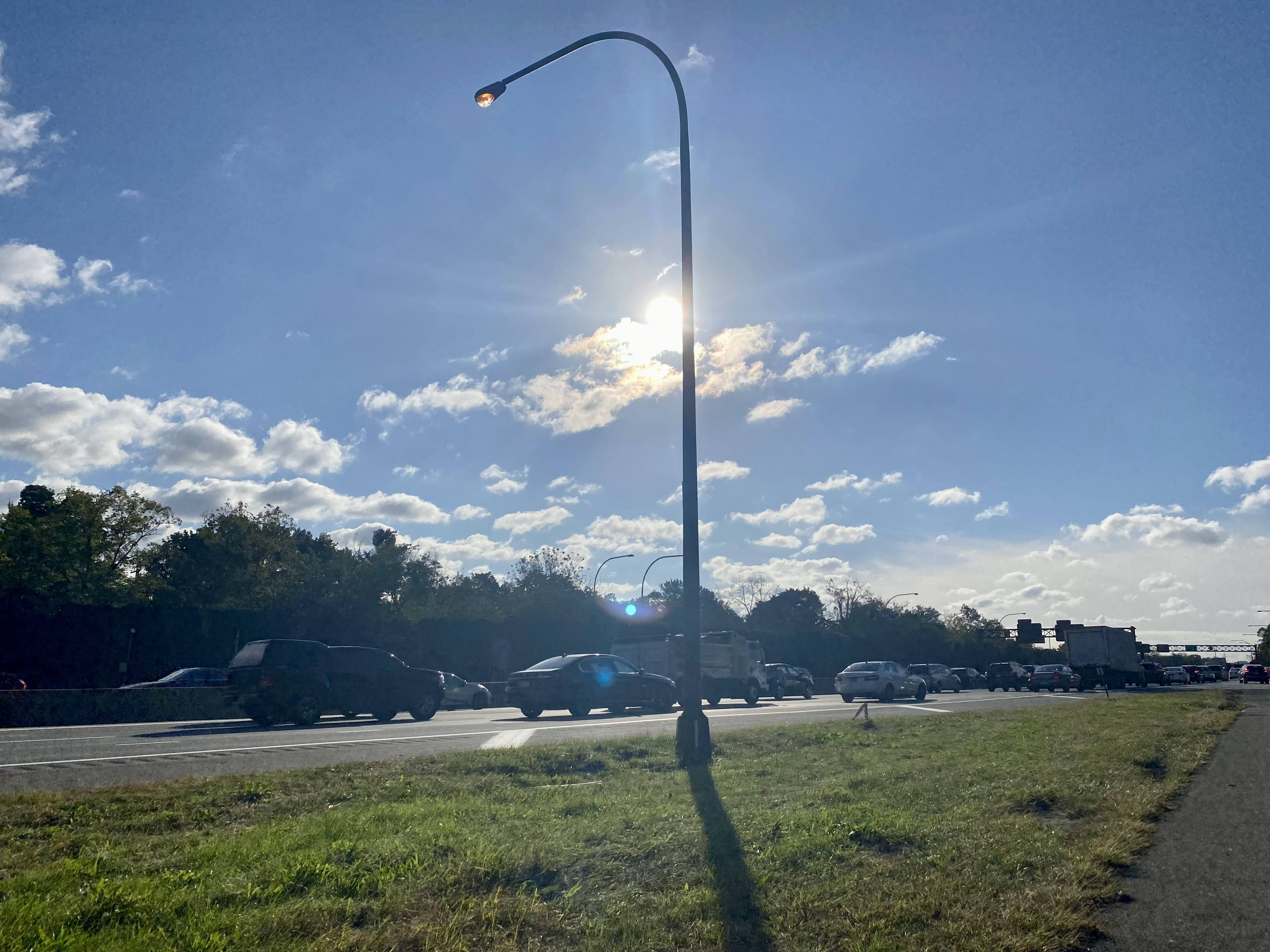
The Long Island Expressway in East Hills at Exit 38, looking west in 2021

- Long Island Expressway (Interstate 495) – Travels through the southern portion of the village, between Glen Cove Road (CR 1) at Exit 39 (at its eastern border, with Old Westbury) and Roslyn Road (CR 7) (at its western border, with Roslyn Heights).

===== State roads =====
Two state roads pass through and serve the village:

- Northern Boulevard (NY 25A) – Forms portions of the northern border of the village, with Greenvale and Old Brookville.
- Northern State Parkway – Forms the southern boundary of the village, with Roslyn Heights and Old Westbury.

Furthermore, Northern Boulevard (NY 25A) runs along the entirety of the village's northern boundary.

===== Other major roads =====
Other major roads which are located within (or pass through) the Village of East Hills include Chestnut Drive, Glen Cove Road, Harbor Hill Road, Locust Lane, Old Powerhouse Road, Old Westbury Road, Red Ground Road, Roslyn Road, and Round Hill Road.

==== Rail ====
While there are no Long Island Rail Road stations located within the village limits, the Oyster Bay Branch forms portions of the village's western border, with Roslyn.

The nearest train station to the village is Roslyn on the Oyster Bay Branch, located in the adjacent, unincorporated hamlet of Roslyn Heights.

==== Bus ====
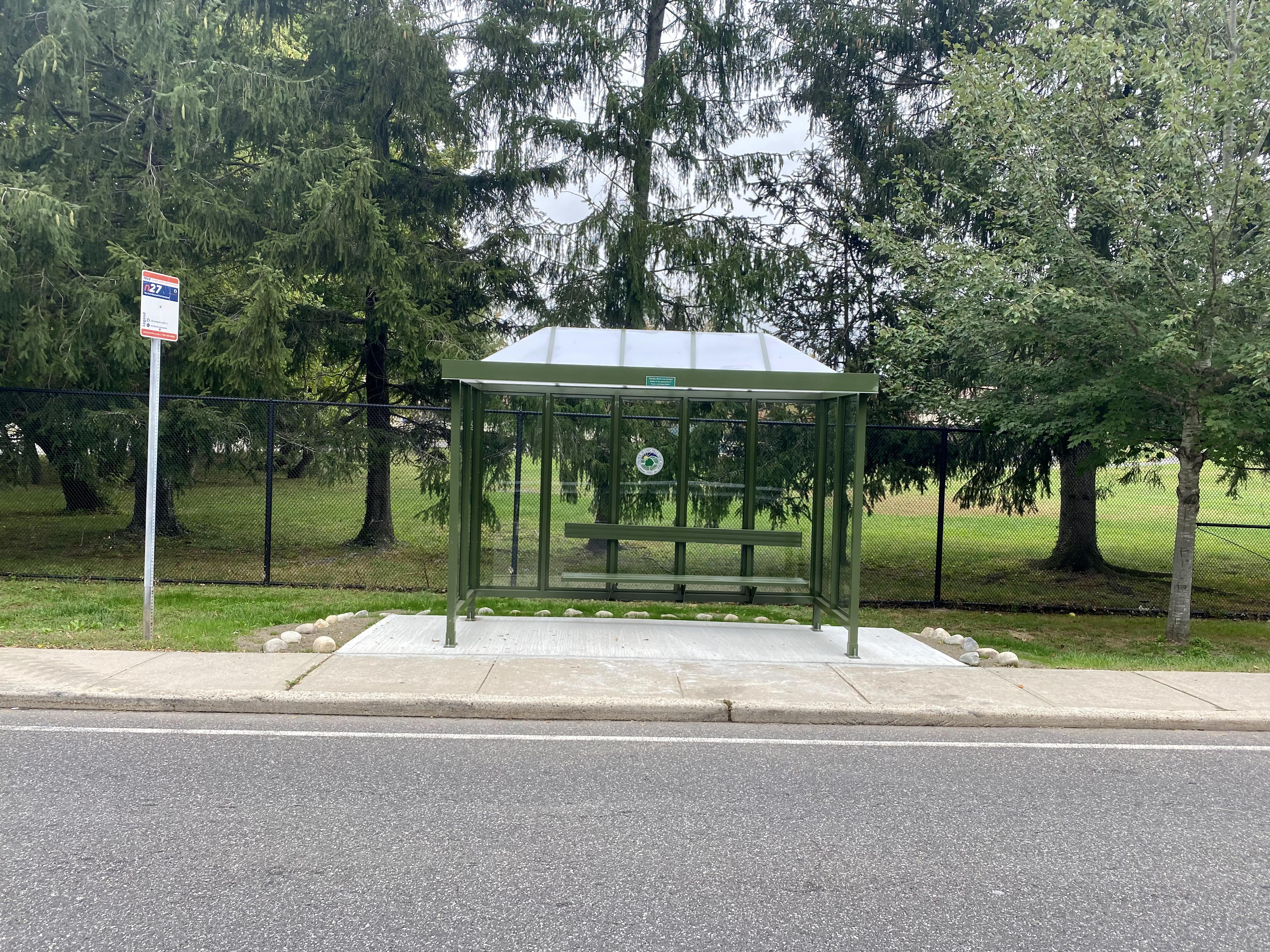
A bus stop on Harbor Hill Road in 2021

East Hills is served by the n20H and n27 bus routes – both of which are operated by Nassau Inter-County Express (NICE). The n20H travels along the village's northern border via Northern Boulevard. The n27 travels through the heart of the village, by way of Harbor Hill Road and Glen Cove Road.

=== Utility services ===
==== Natural gas ====
National Grid provides natural gas to properties within the Village of East Hills that are hooked up to natural gas lines.

==== Power ====
PSEG Long Island provides power to all homes and businesses within the Village of East Hills, on behalf of the Long Island Power Authority.

==== Sewage ====
The overwhelming majority of East Hills is not connected to a sanitary sewer system – although there were failed plans in the 1970s to create a sewer district for much of northwestern Nassau County, which would have included the village in the second phase of the $122 million (1972 USD) project. Accordingly, most homes, businesses, and other improved properties in East Hills rely on cesspools and septic systems.

The few properties in East Hills that are connected to sanitary sewers are connected to the Nassau County Sewage District's sanitary sewage network, via that system's East Hills Interceptor line.

==== Trash collection ====
Trash collection services in East Hills are provided and operated directly by the village.

==== Water ====
The Village of East Hills is served by the following water districts:

- The Roslyn Water District – Serves the portions of East Hills in the Town of North Hempstead, excluding the Northern State Parkway and the New York State Department of Transportation's maintenance yard on Glen Cove Road.
- The Jericho Water District – Serves the portions of East Hills in the Town of Oyster Bay.
- The Village of Old Westbury Water System – Serves the New York State Department of Transportation's maintenance yard on Glen Cove Road.

Additionally, some portions of the Northern State Parkway within East Hills are within the northern extremes of the Albertson Water District – although that district does not serve any properties within the village.

== Landmarks ==
The Mackay Estate Gate Lodge in 2026

Despite the fact that the Mackay family's Stanford White-designed mansion was demolished prior to the construction of the Country Estates subdivision, a number of remaining buildings from the former Harbor Hill estate still stand –three of which were listed on the National Register of Historic Places in 1991:

- Mackay Estate Dairyman's Cottage
- Mackay Estate Gate Lodge
- Mackay Estate Water Tower

Another site of historic interest within East Hills is the Townsend Cemetery, located off Northern Boulevard (NY 25A), near the village's northeastern corner.

== Notable people ==
- Henry D. Cooke – United States Navy officer.
- Michael Crichton – Author of Jurassic Park and creator of ER; grew up on Barberry Lane.
- Hal David – Lyricist; lived in the Mackay Estate Dairyman's Cottage.
- James V. Forrestal – First United States Secretary of Defense, serving between 1947 and 1949. Forrestal lived at his East Hills home, "Old Brick" until his sudden death in Maryland in 1949.
- Wendy Liebman – Comedian.
- Clarence H. Mackay – Financier. Mackay Lived at Harbor Hill.
- Katherine Duer Mackay – Suffragist and socialite; Clarence's ex-wife.
- Elliott Mendelson – Mathematician and author.
- Abraham H. Salkowitz – Architect; lived at 151 Westwood Circle, in a home he designed.

== In popular culture ==
Over the years, scenes for shows and movies have been filmed within the village. These include scenes for The Week of (2018) – filmed within the village, at Temple Beth Sholom and at the Powerhouse Road–Roslyn Road intersection at the village's border with Roslyn Heights – and Bad Education (2019); the East Hills scenes in the latter movie were filmed on Elm Lane, in the Country Estates section of the village, and Harbor Hill Road.

== See also ==
- List of municipalities in New York
- Roslyn, New York
- North Hills, New York
- West Hills, New York
