= Manhasset–Lakeville Water District =

Water district in Nassau County, New York

Water district overview
- Formed: 1911
- Headquarters: 170 East Shore Road, Great Neck, NY 11023
- Website: www.mlwd.net

The Manhasset–Lakeville Water District (MLWD) is a public water utility district serving a large portion of Nassau County, on Long Island, in New York, United States.

== History ==
The Manhasset–Lakeville Water District was founded in 1911, thus making it one of the oldest public water suppliers on all of Long Island.

In 1958, voters in the district voted against a controversial proposal to add fluoride to the district's water supply.

In the 2010s, the MLWD replaced the Munsey Park Water Tower with a newer, more efficient one.

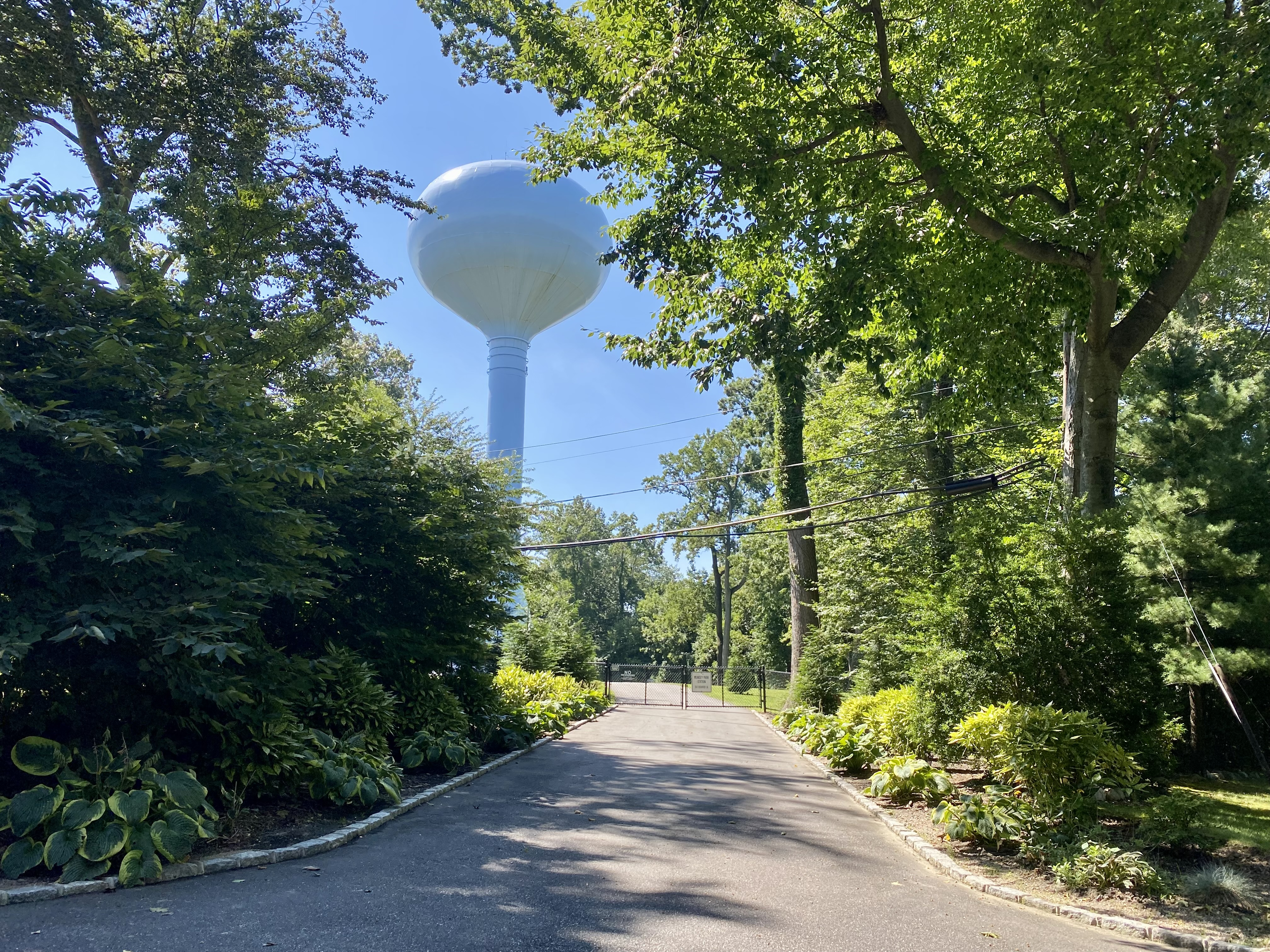
The MLWD's Munsey Park Water Tower in September 2021

== Communities served ==
The Manhasset–Lakeville Water District serves the following communities:

- Flower Hill (part, with the Port Washington Water District and the Roslyn Water District)
- Great Neck Plaza (part, with the Water Authority of Great Neck North)
- Lake Success
- Manhasset
- Manhasset Hills (part, with the Garden City Park Water District)
- Munsey Park
- North Hills (part, with the Garden City Park Water District, the Roslyn Water District, and the Western Nassau Water Authority)
- North New Hyde Park (part, with the Garden City Park Water District and the Western Nassau Water Authority)
- Plandome Heights
- Plandome Manor (part, with the Port Washington Water District)
- Russell Gardens
- Strathmore
- Thomaston (part, with the Water Authority of Great Neck North)
- University Gardens

=== Gap in service ===
The Village of Plandome is not served by the district, as the village maintains its own water system. This makes the Plandome Manor portion of the MLWD isolated from the rest of the district's system.

== Statistics ==
- Average annual amount of water pumped: approximately 2.49 billion gallons
- Number of wells: 18
- Number of above-ground tanks: 6
- Number of below-ground tanks: 2
- Number of treatment plants: 2
- Largest customer: North Shore University Hospital

Additionally, the district serves an area of roughly 10.7 square miles (28 km^{2}).

=== Interconnections ===
The MLWD has 6 interconnections with neighboring water districts. These interconnections are with the Albertson Water District, the Garden City Park Water District, the Port Washington Water District, the Water Authority of Great Neck North, and the Western Nassau Water Authority.
