= Mackay Estate Gate Lodge =

Historic structure in Nassau County, New York, United States

- U.S. National Register of Historic Places
- The Mackay Estate Gate Lodge in 2026

- Location within New York Location within the United States
- Location: Jct. of Harbor Hill and Roslyn Rds., East Hills, New York, U.S.
- Coordinates: 40°47′35.8″N 73°38′32.1″W
- Area: less than one acre
- Architect: McKim, Mead & White; White, Stanford
- Architectural style: Late 19th- and 20th-Century Revivals, French Baroque
- NRHP reference No.: 91000240
- Added to NRHP: March 14, 1991

The Mackay Estate Gate Lodge is a historic gatehouse located in the Incorporated Village of East Hills in Nassau County, New York, United States.

== Description ==
The Mackay Estate Gate Lodge was designed in 1899 and built between 1900 and 1902 by architect Stanford White of McKim, Mead & White in the French Baroque style. It is a small but imposing stone building with a central entrance flanked by small square lodges and topped by a steep slate mansard and pyramidal roof. The central vehicular entrance contains a wrought iron gate of elaborate design. The building was originally a component of Clarence Mackay's Harbor Hill Estate.

It was listed on the National Register of Historic Places in 1991. It is one of three remaining buildings which got listed at that time – the others are the Mackay Estate Dairyman's Cottage and the Mackay Estate Water Tower.

In 2017, the deed to the Mackay Estate Gate Lodge was transferred to the Village of East Hills from the Town of North Hempstead.

On Tuesday, January 25, 2022, the Village of East Hills and Roslyn Landmark Society began a full restoration of the gate lodge, including the stabilization of the slate roof, and the restoration of the doors and windows.

== See also ==
- National Register of Historic Places listings in North Hempstead (town), New York
- Mackay Estate Dairyman's Cottage
- Mackay Estate Water Tower
