= Park at East Hills =

Park in East Hills, New York, United States

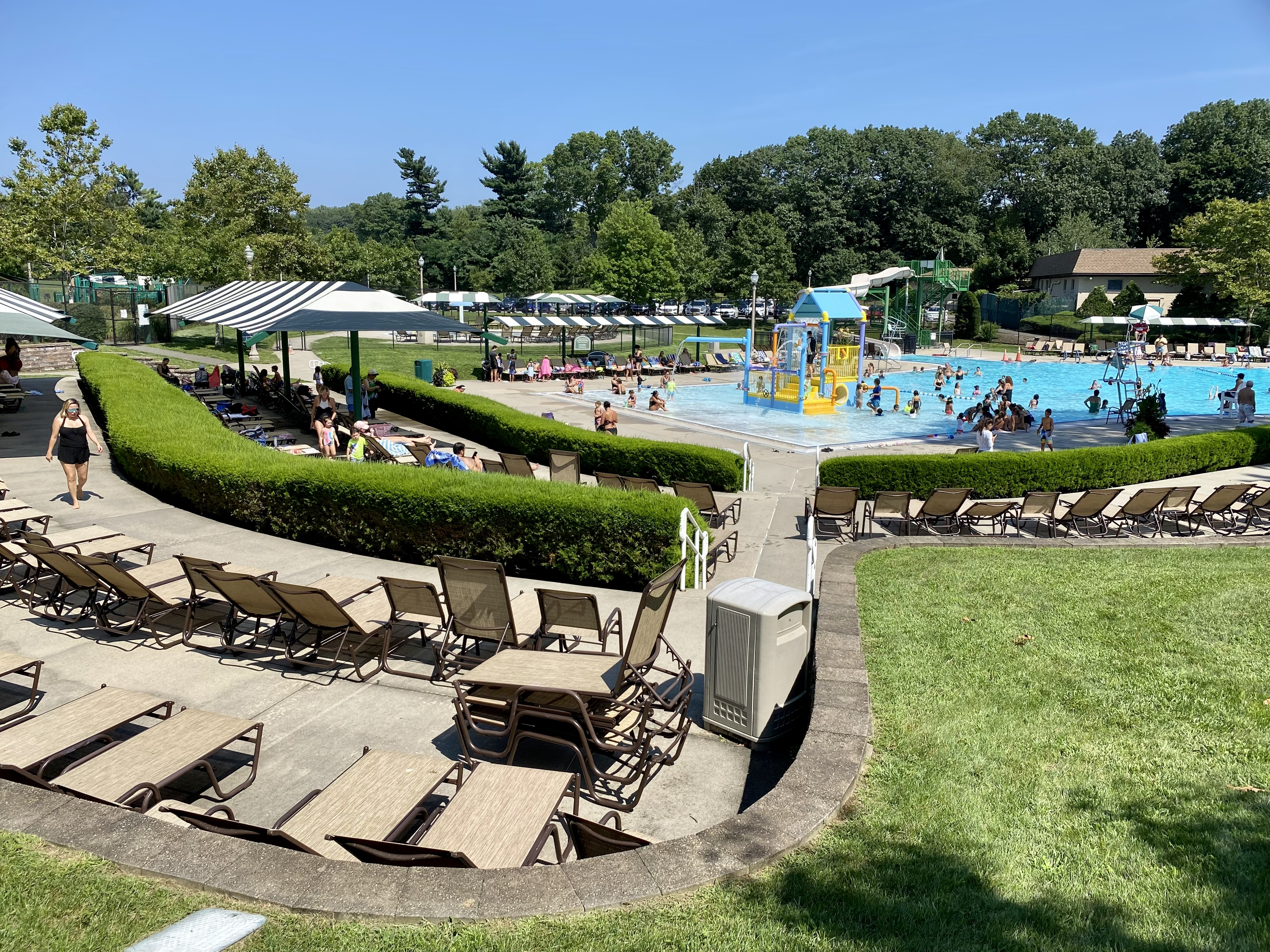
- The pool at the Park at East Hills in 2021
- Interactive map of Park at East Hills
- Type: Village-owned; open to village residents and their guests only
- Location: East Hills, New York, United States
- Coordinates: 40°47′46″N 73°37′40″W
- Owner: Incorporated Village of East Hills
- Manager: Incorporated Village of East Hills
- Status: Open
- Paths: Yes
- Parking: Yes
- Website: villageofeasthills.org

The Park at East Hills is a village-owned park in the Incorporated Village of East Hills, in Nassau County, on the North Shore of Long Island, in New York, United States. It is exclusively open to East Hills village residents and their guests.

== Description ==
The Park at East Hills opened on Labor Day in 2006. It sits on land previously occupied by the Roslyn Air National Guard Station. It is open exclusively to residents of East Hills and their guests, and park cards are required too access entry.

The transformation of the facility, which the Village of East Hills purchased from the United States Government following the closure of the station, cost approximately $7,000,000.

The Park at East Hills has a pool with a slide 110 feet (34 m) long, nature walks, senior facilities, tennis and basketball courts, a playground, ballfields, a theater, a dog park, and a restaurant.

The park is located on more than 50 acres (20 ha) of land.

== See also ==
- Camp Hero State Park – Another park on Long Island, on the site of a former military base.
- Flower Hill Village Park
- Village Club of Sands Point
