= Deepdale Golf Club =

Private golf club in Manhasset, New York

- Location within New York City
- 40.7719°N 73.695195°W

Club information
- Location: Manhasset, New York, United States
- Type: Private
- Total holes: 18
- Website: www.deepdalegolfclub.com

Deepdale Golf Club is a private golf club in Manhasset, New York, just east of New York City on Long Island.

== Early years ==
The club was founded by William K. Vanderbilt II in 1924, using part of his Deepdale summer estate at Lake Success. Charles B. Macdonald designed the course, assisted by Seth Raynor. The Deepdale Golf Club was incorporated on 26 October 1924 as a private club with a strictly limited membership. Noted members in the past included the Duke of Windsor and President Dwight D. Eisenhower.

In the 1950s suburbs began to be built in the region, and in 1954 the Long Island Expressway was built, cutting through the north end of the course. The club bought the nearby Joseph Peter Grace, Sr. estate and had a new course designed by Dick Wilson. The Grace mansion "Tullaroan," constructed in 1910, was used as the clubhouse.

== 1955 Calcutta scandal ==
The prestigious club was the location of the 1955 Deepdale Calcutta handicapping scandal. A Calcutta auction, named after the Royal Calcutta Turf Club, is a form of betting in which the competitors in tournament are auctioned off to bidders in a pool. The "owners" of the winning team split their portion of the pool with the players. Calcuttas were often rigged, with golfers faking their handicaps or accepting bribes to lose. In 1955 two three-handicap golfers entered an amateur tournament at Deepdale. They gave their handicaps as 17 and 18, scored a net 58-57 and won by five strokes. They and the syndicate that backed them each won $16,000 from a $45,000 pool. The scandal emerged after one of the players admitted what he had done in a letter to the President of the club, and the story reached the newspapers. As a result of the scandal, the United States Golf Association formally outlawed Calcuttas.

== Course today ==
The course today is 6,623 yards (6,056 m) from its longest tees. Walking is allowed. It has a par value of 70, a rating of 72.6 and a slope of 135. Some celebrity players have included Bob Hope, Tom Brokaw and Sean Connery. More recent members include Sidney Poitier, Tiki Barber and Michael Bloomberg. As of 2006 the course was rated 36 in the list of America's "100 Most Prestigious Golf Clubs" published by Golf Connoisseur magazine.

In March 2006 it was reported that the village of North Hills, an extremely wealthy community, was looking into using eminent domain laws to condemn the club and convert it to a semi-public course for use by local residents. Given the wealth of the village residents and the wealth of the club members, The New York Times described the contest as "a battle of Goliath against Goliath."
