= Fresh water supply district =

A fresh water supply district is a body which manages fresh water supply in a defined area in the United States. It may have the power of eminent domain. The term fresh water supply district is mostly used in Texas, while water district is used in much of the rest of the United States. Fresh water supply districts were first established in Texas in 1919 and serve as complements to Texas' other water supply system, water improvement districts. As of 1992, there were 38 fresh water supply districts in Texas.

== See also ==
- Drinking water supply and sanitation in the United States
- Drinking water
