= Mackay Estate Dairyman's Cottage =

Historic house in East Hills, New York

- U.S. National Register of Historic Places
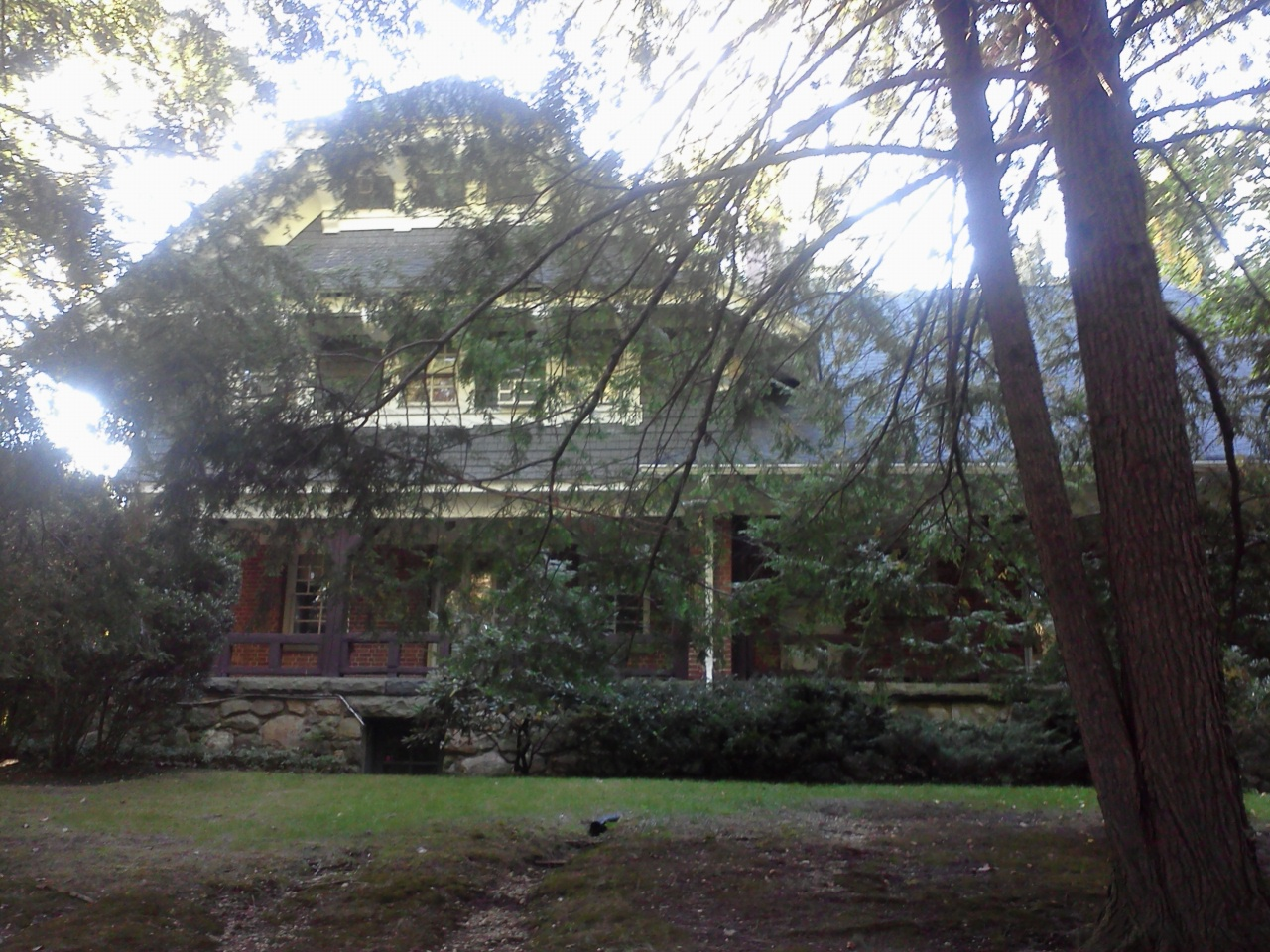

- Location within New York Location within the United States
- Location: 40 Elm Dr., East Hills, New York
- Coordinates: 40°48′2″N 73°37′32″W
- Area: 1.3 acres (0.53 ha)
- Architect: Warren & Wetmore
- Architectural style: Eclectic w/ Japanese Detail
- NRHP reference No.: 91000238
- Added to NRHP: March 14, 1991

The Mackay Estate Dairyman's Cottage is a historic house located within the Incorporated Village of East Hills in Nassau County, on Long Island, in New York, United States.

== Description ==
The Mackay Estate Dairyman's Cottage was designed about 1902 by architects Warren and Wetmore in an eclectic style. It is a 2 1/2-story frame house with a brick first floor set on a rubble base. It features a steep flaring roof, small dormers with steep roofs, deep projecting eaves, and rows of rectangular windows with flat brackets, giving it a strong Japanese feel. The building was originally a component of Clarence Mackay's Harbor Hill Estate. It was later the residence of lyricist Hal David.

The building was listed on the National Register of Historic Places in 1991. It is one of three remaining Harbor Hill Estate buildings which were listed at that time – the others being the Mackay Estate Gate Lodge and the Mackay Estate Water Tower.

As of 2026, the property remains privately owned.

== See also ==
- National Register of Historic Places listings in North Hempstead (town), New York
- Mackay Estate Gate Lodge
- Mackay Estate Water Tower
