= North Hills, New York =

- Village
- Incorporated Village of North Hills
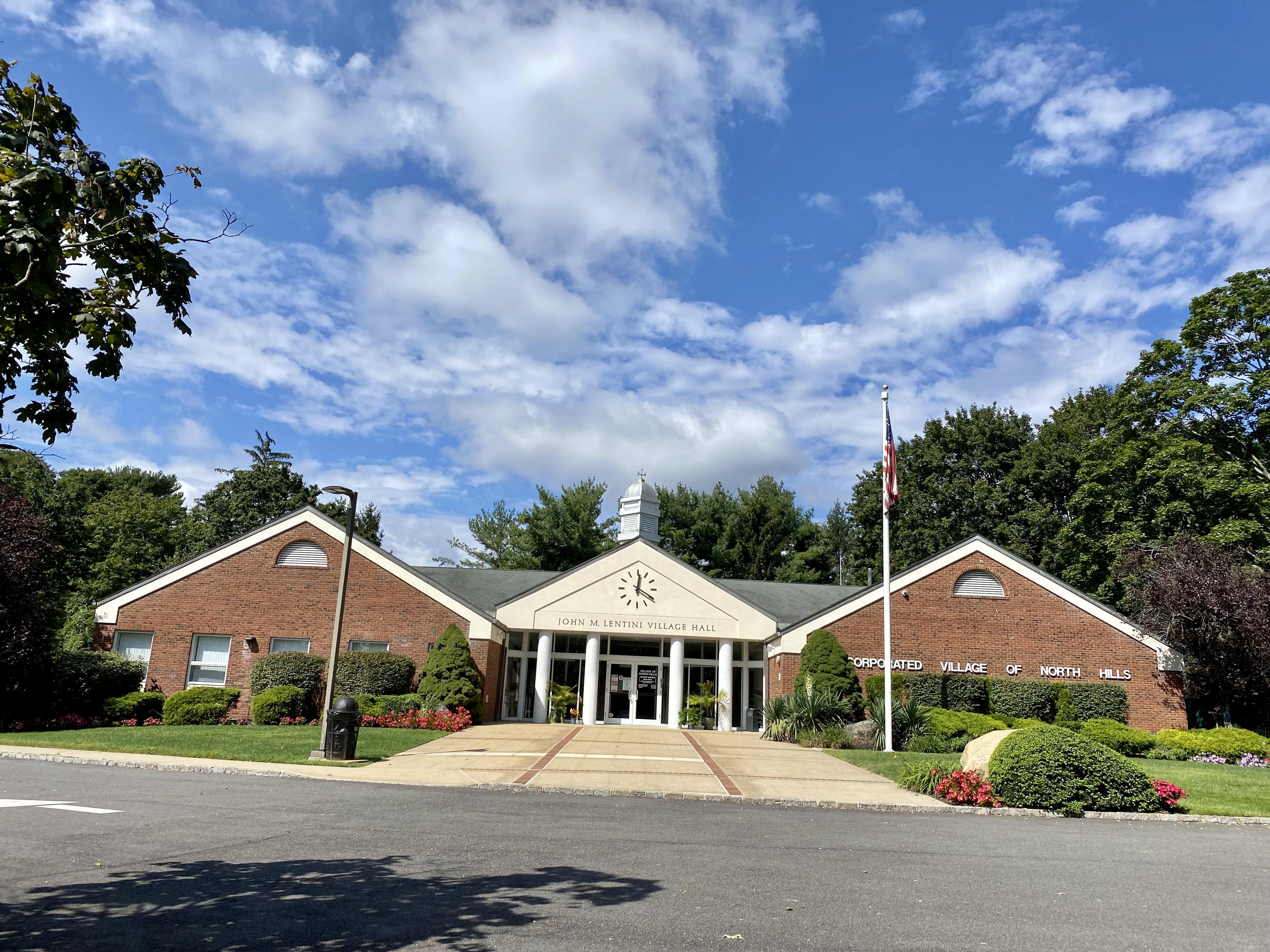
- North Hills Village Hall in 2021
- Motto: "A better place to live"
- Location in Nassau County and the state of New York

- Location on Long Island Location within the state of New York
- Coordinates: 40°46′33″N 73°40′22″W
- Country: United States
- State: New York
- County: Nassau
- Town: North Hempstead
- Incorporated: 1929
- Named for: Its hilly location on Long Island's North Shore

Government
  - Mayor: Marvin Natiss

Area
  - Total: 2.76 sq mi (7.14 km^{2})
  - Land: 2.76 sq mi (7.14 km^{2})
  - Water: 0 sq mi (0.00 km^{2})
- Elevation: 217 ft (66 m)

Population (2020)
  - Total: 5,464
  - Density: 1,981.9/sq mi (765.22/km^{2})
- Time zone: UTC-5 (Eastern (EST))
  - Summer (DST): UTC-4 (EDT)
- ZIP Codes: 11030 (Manhasset); 11576 (Roslyn); 11577 (Roslyn Heights); 11040 (New Hyde Park); 11507 (Albertson)
- Area codes: 516, 363
- FIPS code: 36-53022
- GNIS feature ID: 0972865
- Website: www.northhillsny.gov

North Hills is a village in the Town of North Hempstead in Nassau County, on the North Shore of Long Island, in New York, United States. The population was 5,464 at the time of the 2020 census.

== History ==
The glacial action that formed much of Long Island deposited Shelter Rock in what is now North Hills approximately 11,000 years ago. The Matinecock had a village in the area. Farming developed in North Hills in the middle part of the 17th century. Around this time a long fence was built along the road later known as Northern Boulevard, to the north of North Hills. The lands of the Cow Neck Peninsula enclosed by the fence (present day Manhasset and Port Washington) were used for grazing.

During the 19th century, one of the largest farms in the area was owned by Isaac Underhill Willets.

The village was incorporated in 1929 as a tax haven to prevent the Town of North Hempstead (seated in nearby Manhasset) from raising taxes on the property, as well as to gain and maintain home rule powers. The name North Hills was chosen due to how the village is located in the northern part of Nassau County and because the terrain is very hilly in the area.

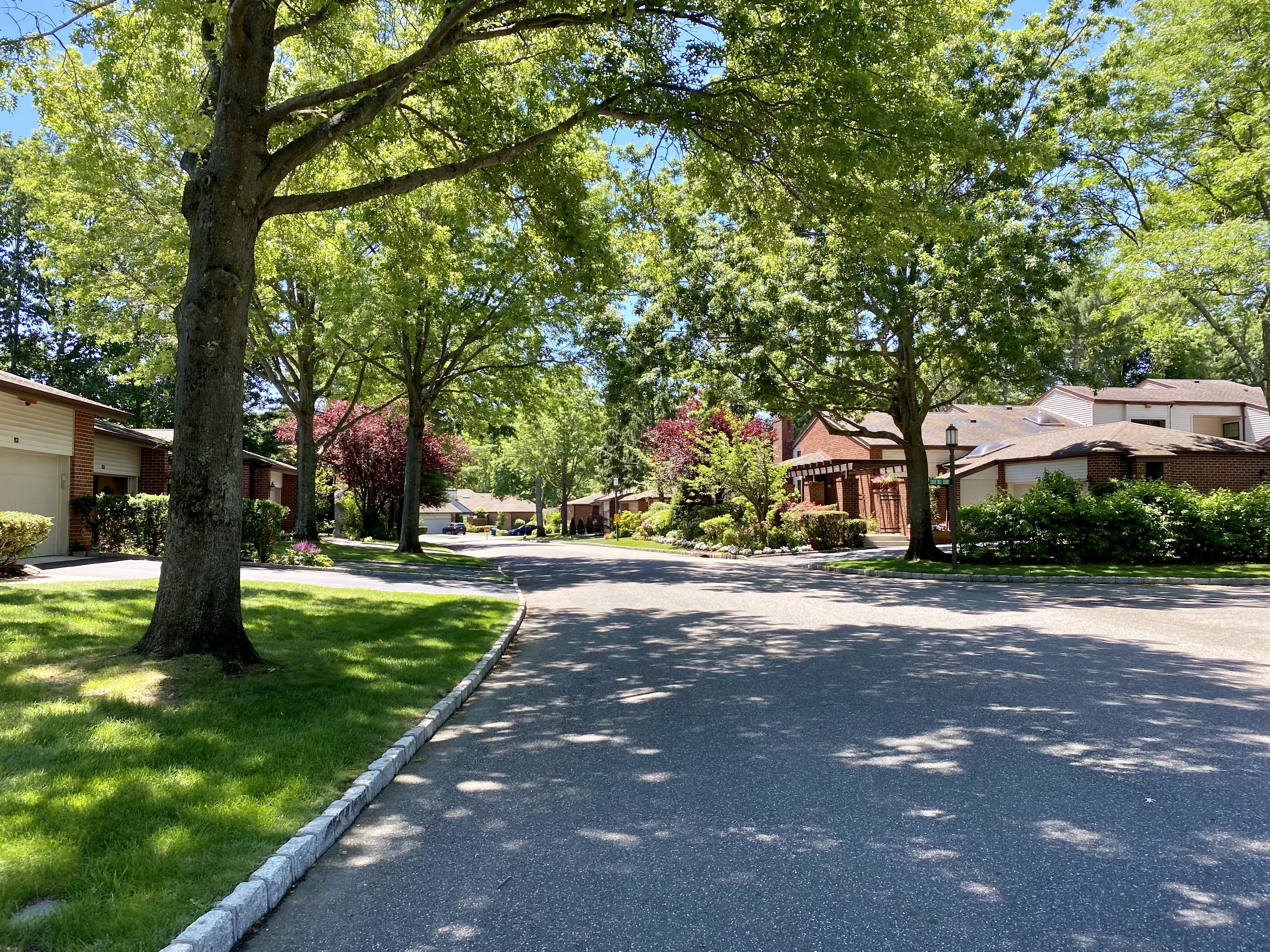
Duck Pond Drive in Estates II – a typical, gated condominium development allowed under the 20th century rezoning plans

In the 1960s, 1970s, and 1980s, North Hills proposed rezoning and downzoning large portions of the village as part of a master plan. The plan was to downzone and rezone for multiple uses, including for condominiums and cluster residences, a shopping center, and commercial and office buildings. Additionally, the rezoning would allow for buildings to be constructed as high as 85 feet (26 m).

The plan was extremely controversial as the downzoning of large estates included the estates of some village officials and their families, and it was believed that the officials were looking to downzone their properties for their own, personal benefit; it was also pointed out that the plans would have a severe negative impact on neighboring communities, and that the village's planning board was bypassed when drafting the plan. This caused the Village Board of adjacent Roslyn Estates to send telegrams to Governor Hugh Carey and Attorney General Louis Lefkowitz in 1977, asking them to investigate the matter, citing "possible impeachable offenses" from the officials in North Hills. The controversy also led to urologist and resident Dr. Lowell H. Kane being elected mayor on the North Hills Alliance Party ticket, which opposed many of the controversial rezoning actions and the associated building and development boom.

The master plan was rejected by the Nassau County Planning Commission twice – first in 1970 and then again in 1980 after revisions were made. Then, after several more modifications were made, it was approved in March 1980.

On May 16, 1983, North Hills dedicated Lowell H. Kane Park. The park, which is owned and operated by North Hills, is named after Lowell H. Kane – a former mayor of North Hills.

The present North Hills Village Hall opened in 1986. Prior to its opening, village meetings had been held at various places throughout the village.

=== Deepdale Country Club controversy ===
As the general housing situation of the village of North Hills is private, gated community style living, there is little communal activity. In the 2000s, after being ranked as one of the wealthiest communities in the United States, the Mayor of North Hills decided that acquiring the Deepdale Golf Club through eminent domain for the exclusive use of residents would make the village a better place, and that it would raise home values. Deepdale, which is located on the grounds of the former estate of Joseph P. Grace, served the village with legal papers, claiming that they were abusing government power by trying to close a country club for residents only. After much dispute in and out of court, the case eventually dissolved, leaving the club in the hands of its members.

== Geography ==
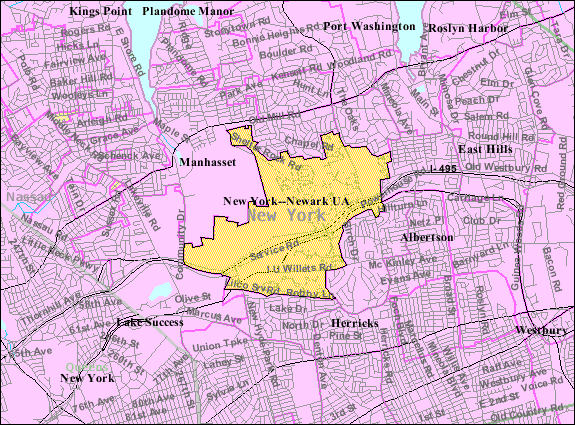
U.S. Census map of North Hills

According to the United States Census Bureau, the village has a total area of 2.8 square miles (7.3 km^{2}), all land.

The Long Island Expressway (Interstate 495) and the Northern State Parkway both travel through the south–central portion of North Hills.

=== Climate ===
According to the Köppen climate classification, North Hills has a Humid subtropical climate (type Cfa) with cool, wet winters and hot, humid summers. Precipitation is uniform throughout the year, with slight spring and fall peaks.

== Demographics ==
Historical population
Census	Pop.	Note	%±
1930	339		—
1940	295		−13.0%
1950	330		11.9%
1960	359		8.8%
1970	295		−17.8%
1980	1,587		438.0%
1990	3,453		117.6%
2000	4,301		24.6%
2010	5,075		18.0%
2020	5,464		7.7%
U.S. Decennial Census

=== Racial and ethnic composition ===
North Hills village, New York – Racial and ethnic composition Note: the US Census treats Hispanic/Latino as an ethnic category. This table excludes Latinos from the racial categories and assigns them to a separate category. Hispanics/Latinos may be of any race.
Race / Ethnicity (NH = Non-Hispanic)	Pop 2000	Pop 2010	Pop 2020	% 2000	% 2010	% 2020
White alone (NH)	3,463	3,530	3,245	80.52%	69.56%	59.39%
Black or African American alone (NH)	32	54	53	0.74%	1.06%	0.97%
Native American or Alaska Native alone (NH)	0	0	0	0.00%	0.00%	0.00%
Asian alone (NH)	681	1,283	1,878	15.83%	25.28%	34.37%
Native Hawaiian or Pacific Islander alone (NH)	0	0	3	0.00%	0.00%	0.05%
Other race alone (NH)	1	7	24	0.02%	0.14%	0.44%
Mixed race or Multiracial (NH)	62	89	110	1.44%	1.75%	2.01%
Hispanic or Latino (any race)	62	112	151	1.44%	2.21%	2.76%
Total	4,301	5,075	5,464	100.00%	100.00%	100.00%

=== 2020 census ===
As of the 2020 census, North Hills had a population of 5,464. The median age was 59.2 years. 13.8% of residents were under the age of 18 and 39.8% were 65 years of age or older. For every 100 females, there were 88.1 males, and for every 100 females age 18 and over, there were 84.9 males.

100.0% of residents lived in urban areas, while 0.0% lived in rural areas.

There were 2,290 households, of which 19.6% had children under the age of 18 living in them. Of all households, 62.1% were married-couple households, 10.9% were households with a male householder and no spouse or partner present, and 23.6% were households with a female householder and no spouse or partner present. About 24.0% of all households were made up of individuals, and 16.5% had someone living alone who was 65 years of age or older.

There were 2,500 housing units, of which 8.4% were vacant. The homeowner vacancy rate was 2.2%, and the rental vacancy rate was 24.9%.

=== 2000 census ===
As of the census of 2000, there were 4,301 people, 1,808 households, and 1,424 families residing in the village. The population density was 1,542.5 inhabitants per square mile (595.6/km^{2}). There were 1,907 housing units at an average density of 683.9 per square mile (264.1/km^{2}). The racial makeup of the village was 81.42% White, 0.91% African American, 15.83% Asian, 0.14% from other races, and 1.70% from two or more races. Hispanic or Latino of any race were 1.44% of the population.

There were 1,808 households, out of which 19.0% had children under the age of 18 living with them, 73.5% were married couples living together, 3.8% had a female householder with no husband present, and 21.2% were non-families. 18.1% of all households were made up of individuals, and 9.2% had someone living alone who was 65 years of age or older. The average household size was 2.37 and the average family size was 2.66.

In the village, the population was spread out, with 14.5% under the age of 18, 4.0% from 18 to 24, 17.2% from 25 to 44, 36.9% from 45 to 64, and 27.3% who were 65 years of age or older. The median age was 54 years. For every 100 females, there were 91.3 males. For every 100 females age 18 and over, there were 89.1 males.

The median income for a household in the village was $149,122, and the median income for a family was $184,223. Males had a median income of $100,000 versus $60,789 for females. The per capita income for the village was $100,093. About 3.4% of families and 6.3% of the population were below the poverty line, including 16.1% of those under age 18 and 6.0% of those age 65 or over.

== Government ==
=== Village government ===
As of June 2026, the Mayor of North Hills is Marvin Natiss, the Deputy Mayor of North Hills is Dennis Sgambati, and the Village Trustees of North Hills are Elliott Arnold, Gail Cohen, and Phyllis Lentini.

=== Representation in higher government ===
On the town level, North Hills is located in the Town of North Hempstead's 2nd council district, which as of June 2026 is represented on the North Hempstead Town Council by Edward W. Scott (R–Albertson).

On the county level, North Hills is located in Nassau County's 10th Legislative district, which as of March 2022 is represented in the Nassau County Legislature by Mazi Melesa Pilip (R–Great Neck).

On the state level, North Hills is located within the New York State Assembly's 16th State Assembly district and the New York State Senate's 7th State Senate district, which as of June 2026 are represented by Daniel J. Norber (R–Great Neck) and Jack M. Martins (R–Old Westbury), respectively.

On the federal level, North Hills is located in New York's 3rd congressional district, which as of June 2026 is represented by Thomas R. Suozzi (D–Glen Cove). Like the rest of New York, it is represented in the United States Senate by Charles E. Schumer (D) and Kirsten E. Gillibrand (D).

=== Politics ===
In the 2024 U.S. presidential election, the majority of North Hills voters voted for Kamala D. Harris (D).

== Parks and recreation ==
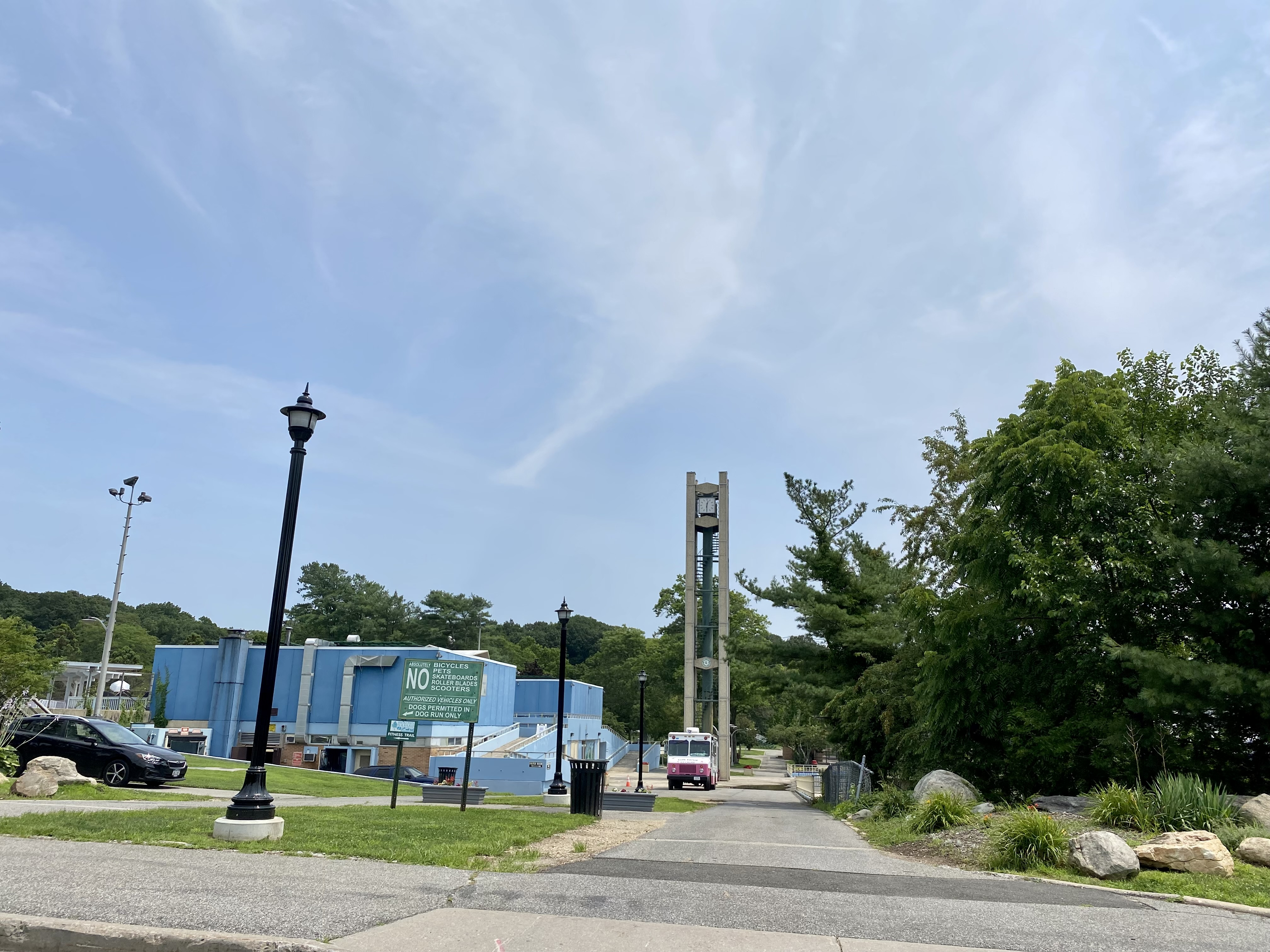
Christopher Morley Park in 2021

Two public parks are located within North Hills:

- Christopher Morley Park – A Nassau County-owned park located at the northeastern corner of North Hills.
- Lowell H. Kane Park – A park owned and operated by North Hills exclusively for village residents and their guests.

The village is also home to two private golf clubs: the Deepdale Golf Club and the North Hills Country Club.

Several gated communities within the village also maintain their own private parks and recreation facilities for their residents and their guests.

== Education ==
=== Schools ===
==== Public ====
North Hills is split among four public school districts. Depending on where in North Hills they reside, students attending public schools go to the Great Neck Union Free School District, the Herricks Union Free School District, the Manhasset Union Free School District, or the Roslyn Union Free School District.

Additionally, the Manhasset UFSD's Shelter Rock Elementary School is located within the village.

==== Private ====
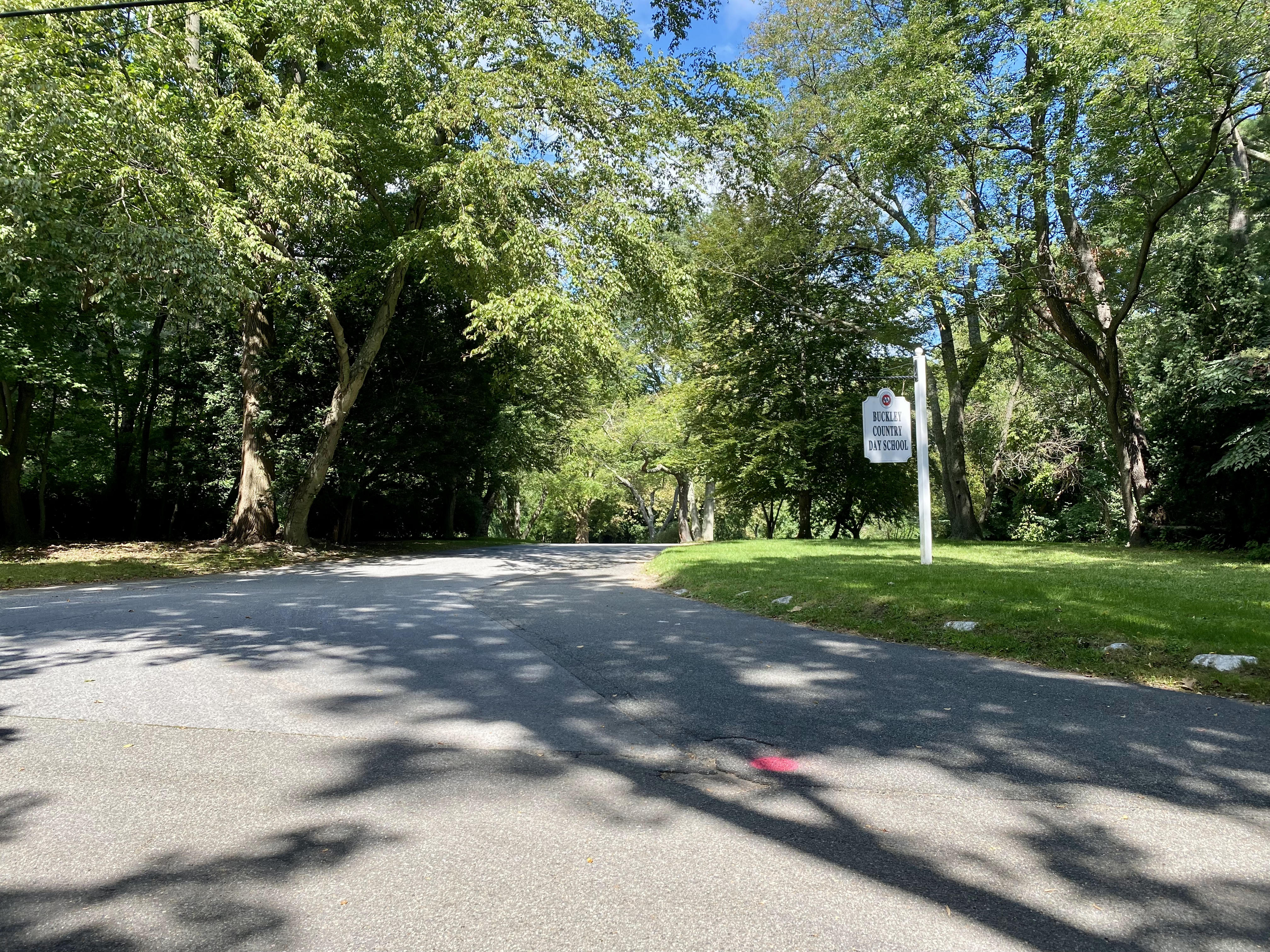
An entrance to Buckley Day School in 2021

The Buckley Country Day School is located within North Hills.

=== Library districts ===
North Hills is split between four library districts. The Great Neck Library District serves the portions of North Hills zoned for the Great Neck UFSD, the Manhasset Library District serves the areas zoned for the Manhasset UFSD, Roslyn's library district (the Bryant Library) serves the areas zoned for the Roslyn UFSD, and the Shelter Rock Library District serves the areas zoned for the Herricks UFSD.

== Infrastructure ==
=== Transportation ===
==== Road ====
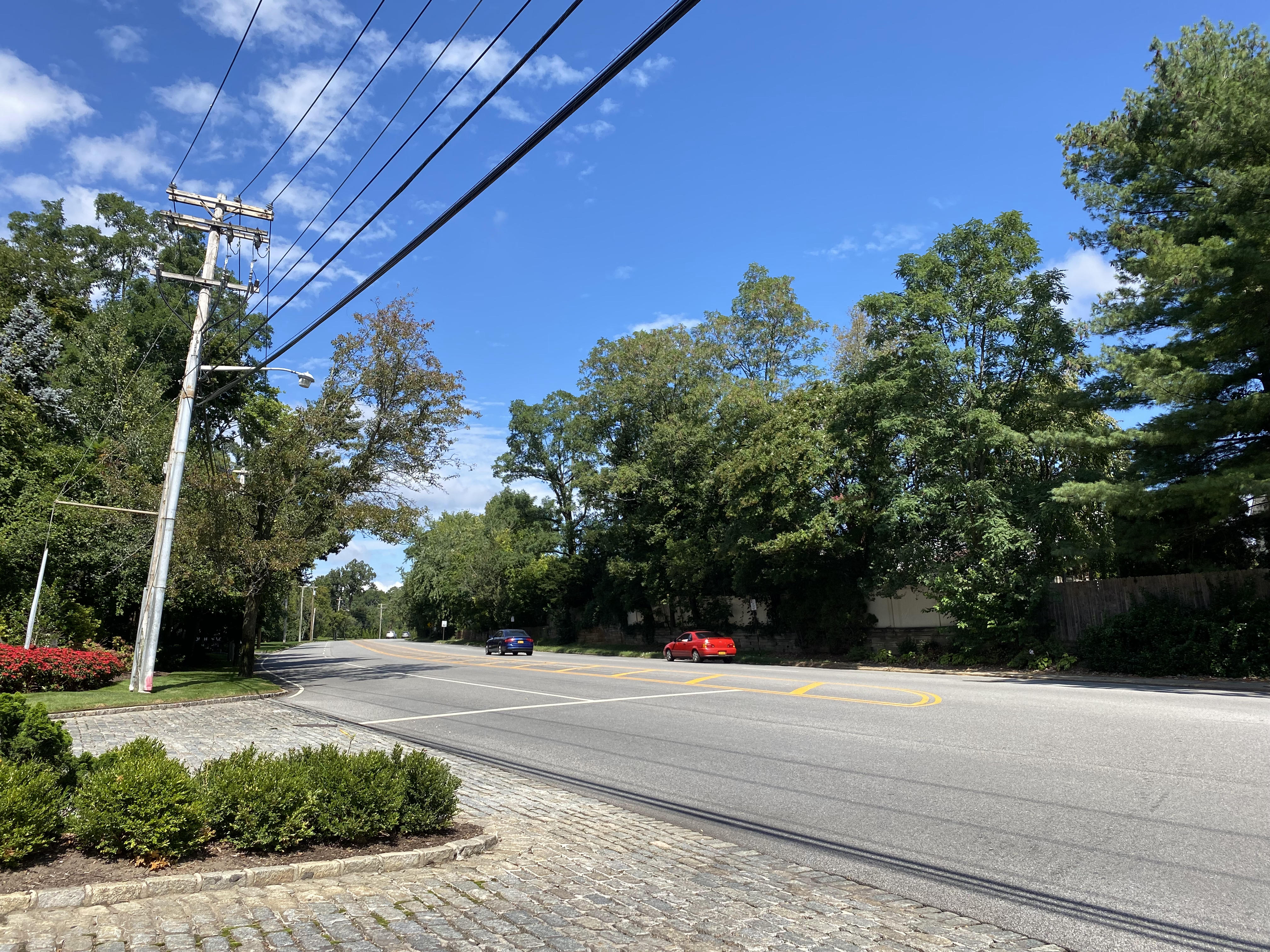
Shelter Rock Road, looking north from Links Drive, in 2021

Two limited-access highways, the Long Island Expressway (Interstate 495) and the Northern State Parkway, travel through and serve the village; the historic Long Island Motor Parkway used to pass through North Hills, as well. Other major roads which travel through North Hills include I.U. Willets Road (CR D24), Searingtown Road (CR 101), and Shelter Rock Road (CR 8).

===== Road layout =====
The road layout in North Hills is varied. Certain areas primarily feature cul-de-sacs, whereas other areas (especially the gated developments) feature many unpredictable, meandering roads.

The village does not own any of the streets within its corporate limits, thus meaning they are not maintained through the village. The majority of streets within North Hills are privately owned and maintained. Other streets are maintained and owned by Nassau County, the Town of North Hempstead, or New York State.

==== Bus ====
The n25 and n26 bus routes run through a small section of the southwestern portion of the village. These two bus routes are operated by Nassau Inter-County Express (NICE).

===== North Hills Village Shuttle =====
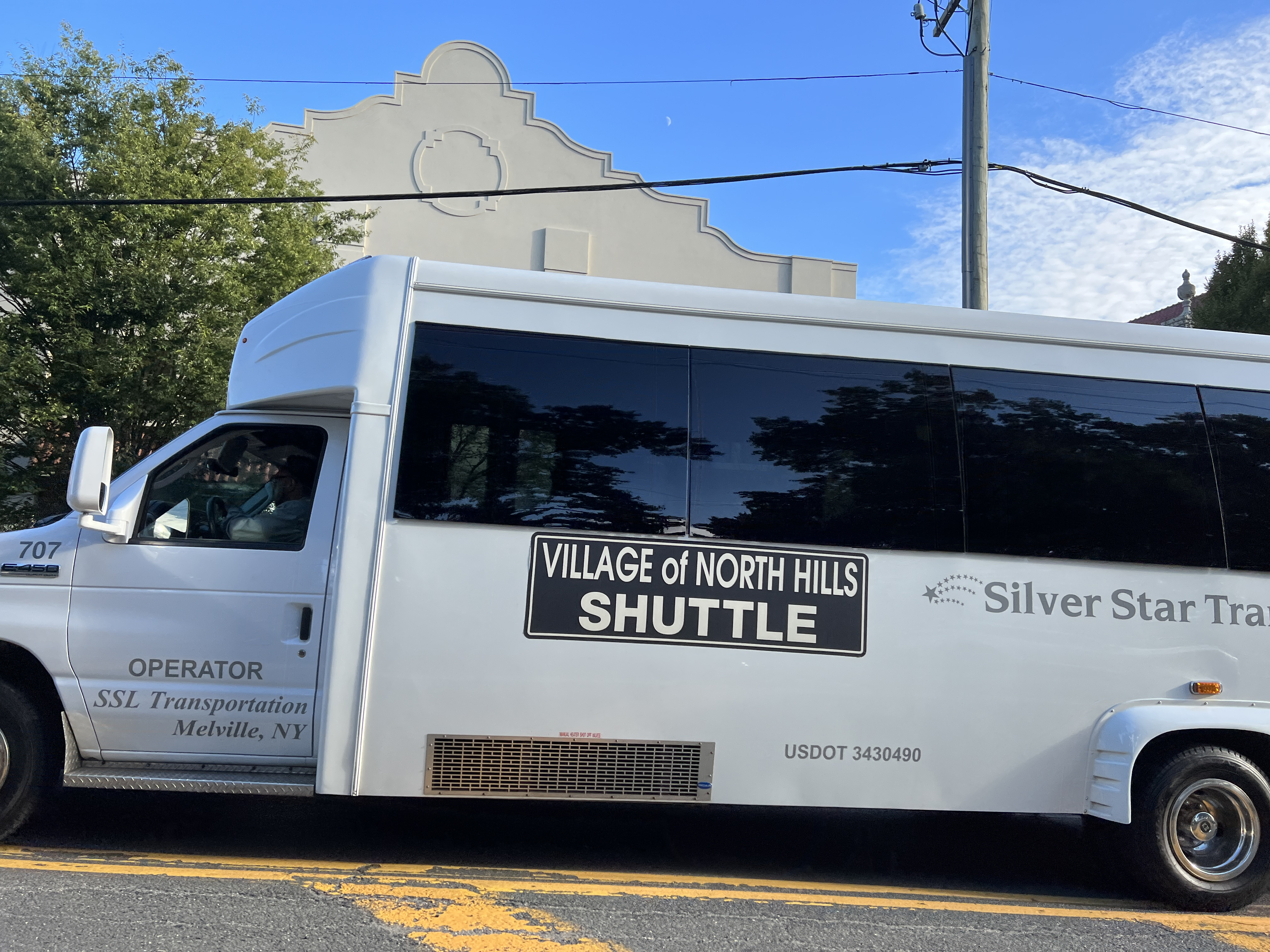
A Village Hall-bound Village of North Hills Shuttle bus in 2023

The Village of North Hills also operates a free commuter shuttle between Village Hall and the Manhasset LIRR station exclusively for village residents; a designated shuttle parking lot is located at Village Hall. The shuttle runs weekdays and a village-issued permit is required for transport.

=== Utilities ===
==== Natural gas ====
National Grid USA provides natural gas to properties within North Hills that are hooked up to natural gas lines.

==== Power ====
PSEG Long Island provides power to all homes and businesses within North Hills, on behalf of the Long Island Power Authority.

==== Sewage ====
The majority of North Hills is sewered. The areas which are sewered are connected to and located within the Nassau County Sewage District, which handles and treats the village's sanitary waste.

The remainder of the village relies on cesspools and septic systems. The nonsewered areas in North Hills are primarily located along the panhandle extending towards Manhasset.

==== Water ====
North Hills is located within the boundaries of the Albertson Water District, the Garden City Park Water District, the Manhasset–Lakeville Water District, and the Roslyn Water District. Of these 4 water districts, the Manhasset–Lakeville Water District serves the majority of the village.

== Notable people ==
- Nicholas F. Brady – Businessman.
- Mike Breen – Broadcaster for the New York Knicks.
- Tom T. Chamales – Novelist; ex-husband of Helen O'Connell.
- Joseph Peter Grace, Sr. – Businessman, polo player, and Thoroughbred horse owner; President of W.R. Grace and Company.
- Joseph Peter Grace, Jr. – Businessman and former North Hills village official; President of W.R. Grace and Company.
- Martin Greenfield – Holocaust survivor and master tailor.
- Anna M. Kaplan – Politician; former Democratic New York State Senator.
- Helen O'Connell – Singer; ex-wife to Tom T. Chamales.
- Ralph Pulitzer – Publisher.
- Lorinda de Roulet – Philanthropist and baseball executive.
- Vincent de Roulet – Former U.S. Ambassador to Jamaica and Mayor of North Hills.
- Linda Sun – Former Chief of Staff to Governor Kathleen C. Hochul.

== See also ==
- List of municipalities in New York
- East Hills, New York
