= Harbor Hill =

Mansion on Long Island, New York, USA

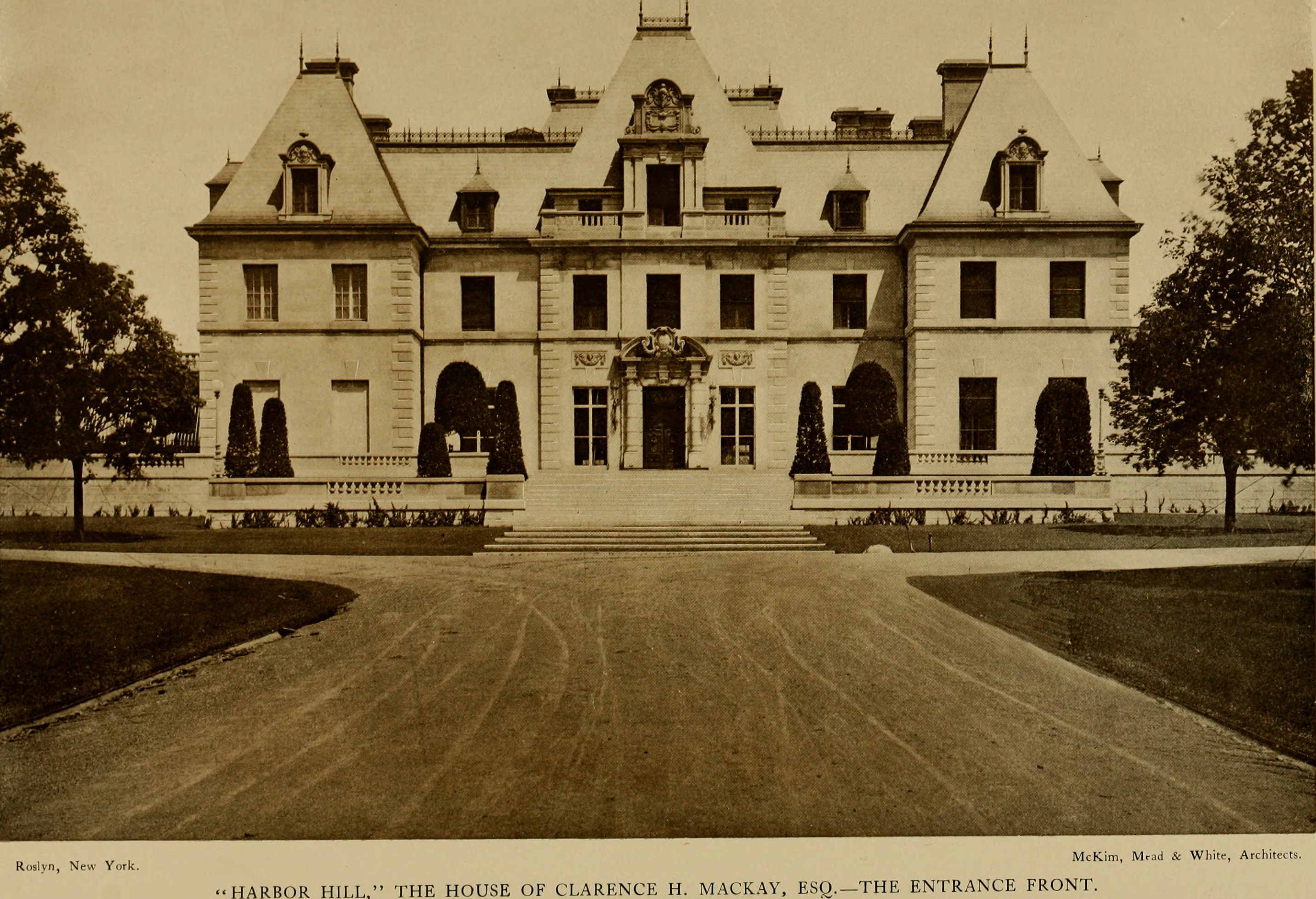

Highest point
- Elevation: 348 ft (106 m)
- Prominence: 348.0 ft (106.1 m)
- Listing: New York County High Points 58th
- Coordinates: 40°47′57″N 73°38′22″W

Geography
- Location within New York
- Location: Roslyn, New York, United States
- Topo map: USGS Sea Cliff

Harbor Hill was a large Long Island mansion built from 1899 to 1902 in the present-day Village of East Hills, New York, for telecommunications magnate Clarence Hungerford Mackay.

It was designed by McKim, Mead & White, with Stanford White supervising the project – the largest private residence he ever designed; it was demolished in 1949.

The home was built atop the 348-foot (106 m) Harbor Hill – the highest point in Nassau County, New York; the hill itself is located in both the Villages of East Hills and Roslyn.

== History ==
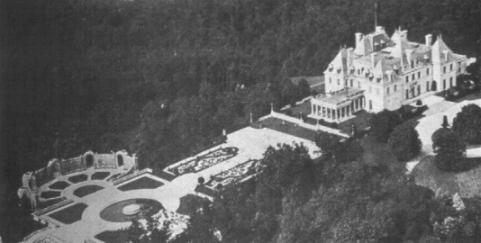
Harbor Hill in 1922

Clarence Mackay (1874–1938) was the son of Comstock Lode magnate John William Mackay, and inherited much of an estimated $500 million fortune upon his father's death in 1902 (approximately $13 billion in 2012 dollars). White collaborated closely with Clarence Mackay's wife, Katharine Duer Mackay (1880–1930), and with her approval based the main façade of Harbor Hill upon that of François Mansart's Château de Maisons of 1642, using a mix of other influences to finish the overall design.

Built at great expense and furnished lavishly (at least three different decorating firms were employed), the home originally sat on 688 acres (2.78 km^{2}) and enjoyed views across Roslyn Harbor to Long Island Sound. Formal terraces and gardens were finished by Guy Lowell.

Social events held at the house included a grand party for the then Prince of Wales (later Edward VIII and the Duke of Windsor) in 1924.

On June 13, 1927, Charles Lindbergh, accompanied by his mother and the Mayor of New York, was feted at a banquet and dance Mackay held the night of transatlantic aviator's ticker-tape parade on 5th Avenue.

In 1931, upon the incorporation of the Village of East Hills, the estate was included within the boundaries of that municipality.

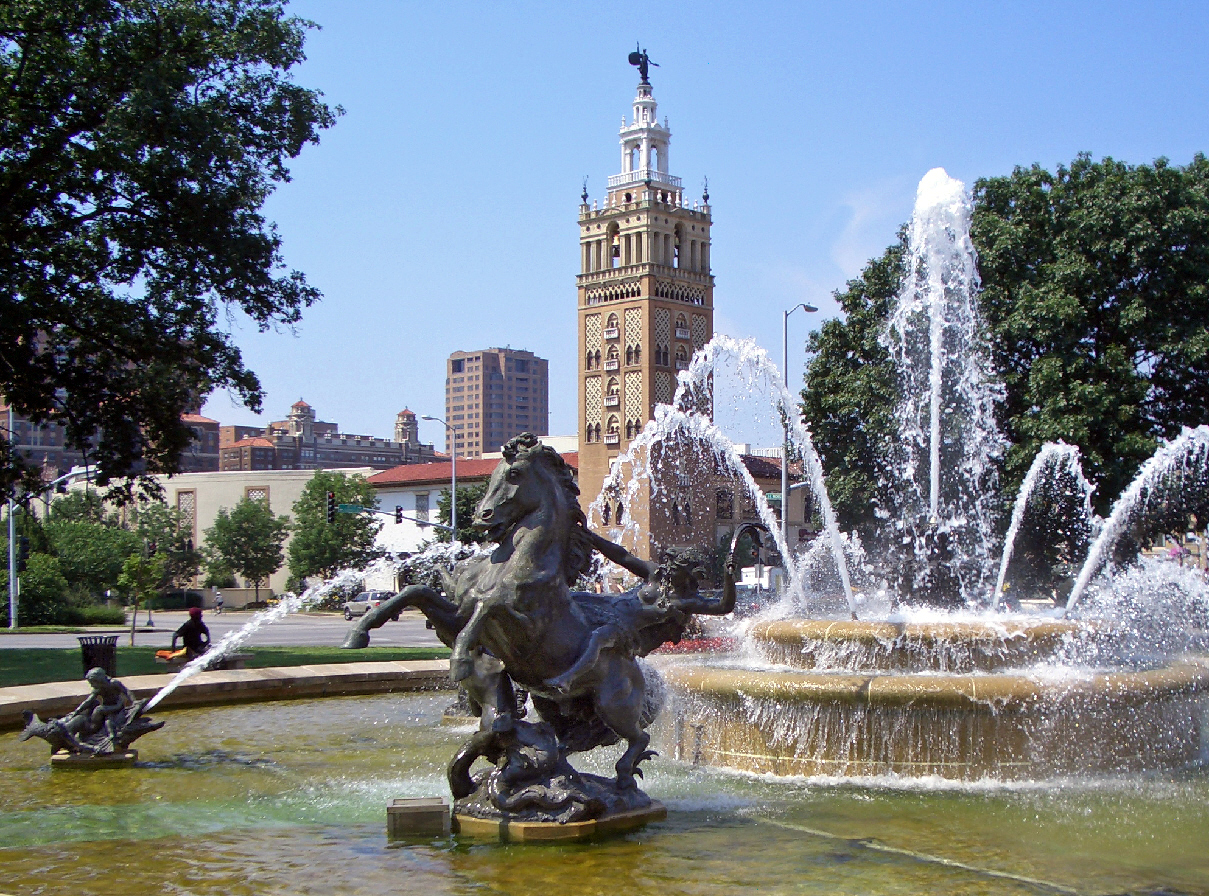
Fountain by Henri-Léon Gréber, now in Kansas City

The building was vandalized during World War II, and demolished in 1947. After Harbor Hill was razed; a fountain with four equestrian statues designed by Henri-Léon Gréber was moved to Kansas City, Missouri, where it is displayed adjacent to Country Club Plaza.

=== Summit ===
At an elevation of 348 feet Harbor Hill is the highest point in Nassau County, New York. Whether Harbor Hill or 401-foot Jayne's Hill to the east was the highest point on Long Island was a point of some debate in the 19th century, with Harbor Hill often thought to be the higher. A news report of 1901 reported that Jayne's Hill was actually taller. Nevertheless, the issue remained contested at least as late as 1938.

=== Remaining buildings ===
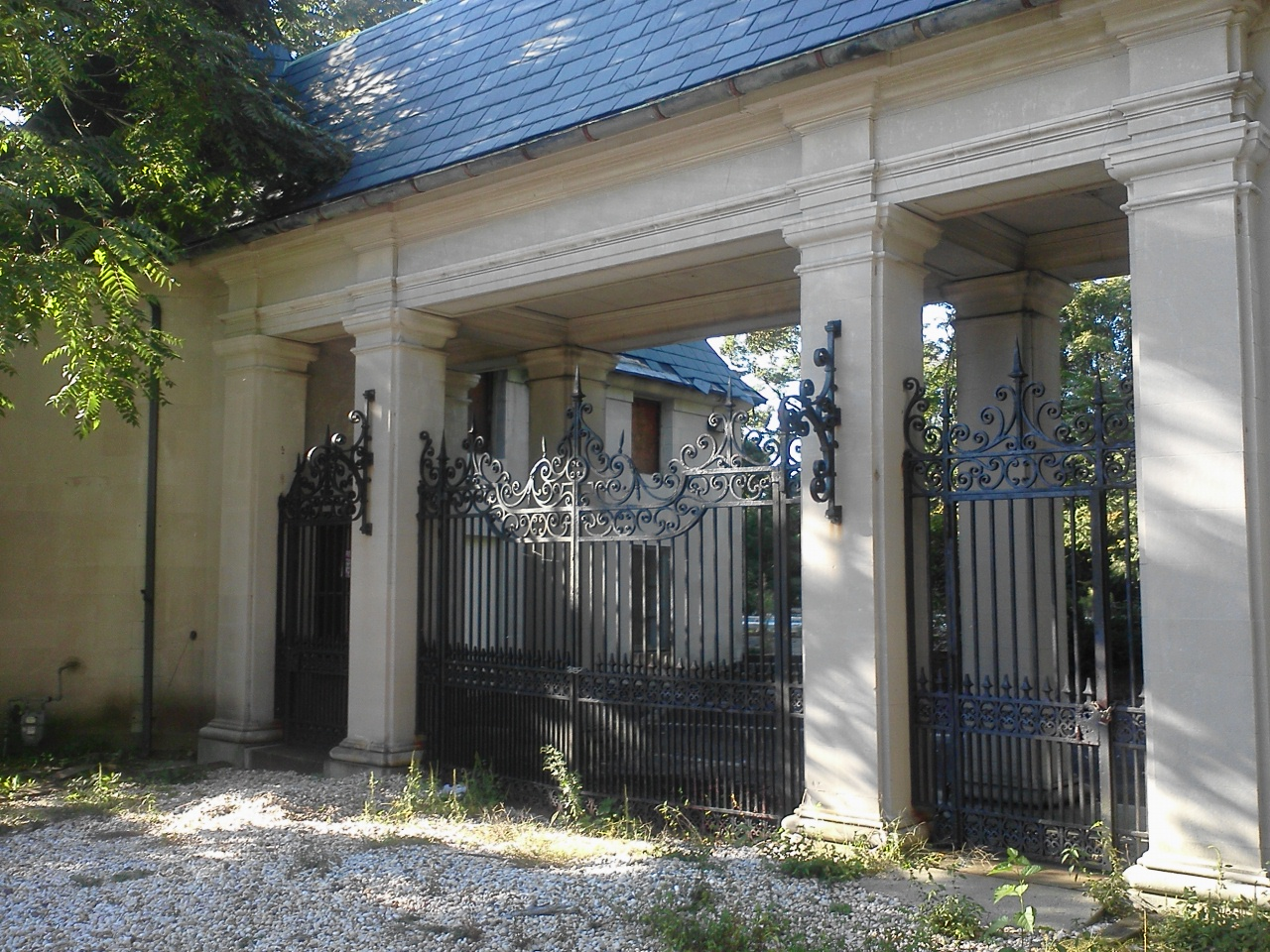
Mackay Estate Gate Lodge

Much of the estate, including the site of the main building, has been covered with a modern housing development. However, three remaining buildings from the Harbor Hill estate were listed on the National Register of Historic Places in 1991: the Mackay Estate Dairyman's Cottage, the Mackay Estate Gate Lodge, and the Mackay Estate Water Tower.

== See also ==
- List of Gilded Age mansions
- "Harbor Hill: Portrait of a House" by Richard Guy Wilson.
