= Mackay Estate Water Tower =

- U.S. National Register of Historic Places
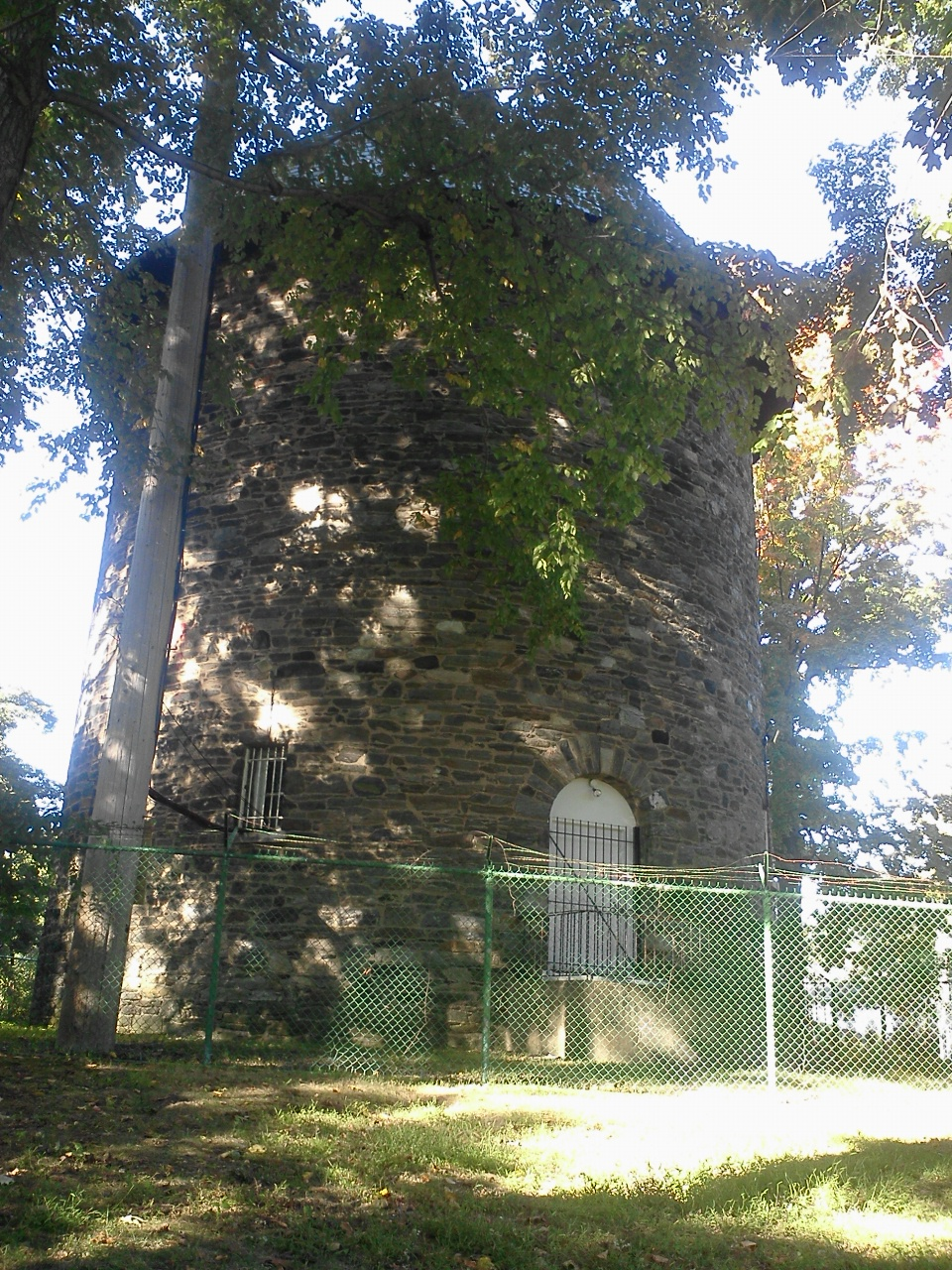
- The Mackay Estate Water Tower in 2013

- Location within New York Location within the United States
- Location: Redwood Dr. between Lincoln Dr. and Lufberry Dr., East Hills, New York
- Coordinates: 40°47′51″N 73°38′23″W
- Area: less than one acre
- Built: 1902
- Architect: McKim, Mead & White; White, Stanford
- Architectural style: Picturesque
- NRHP reference No.: 91000239
- Added to NRHP: March 14, 1991

Mackay Estate Water Tower is a historic water tower located in the Incorporated Village of East Hills in Nassau County, on Long Island, in New York, United States. The tower was originally a component of Clarence Mackay's Harbor Hill Estate.

== Description ==
The tower is a utilitarian structure manufactured by the Phillipsburg, New Jersey-baed firm of Tippett and Wood. The tank is round in plan and topped by a bell-shaped slate roof and copper cupola. The tank stands on eight legs, each of which is 34 feet tall.

Originally a component of Clarence Mackay's Harbor Hill Estate, the water tower and tank are concealed inside a tall structure designed by Stanford White that is constructed of stone, laid in random ashlar, and the roof is spanned by a Guastavino tile dome.

It was listed on the National Register of Historic Places in 1991. It is one of three remaining buildings which were listed at that time – the others are the Mackay Estate Dairyman's Cottage and Mackay Estate Gate Lodge.

== See also ==
- National Register of Historic Places listings in North Hempstead (town), New York
- Mackay Estate Dairyman's Cottage
- Mackay Estate Gate Lodge
