= Water district =

Special district that supplies water and sewer services

A water district is a special district given the task of supplying water and sewer needs to a community, and in many cases is granted powers such as Eminent domain to acquire land and water rights. This term is commonly used in the United States.

== See also ==
- Irrigation district
- Drinking water supply and sanitation in the United States
- Fresh water supply district
