= Roslyn High School =

Coordinates: 40°47′32″N 73°38′23″W

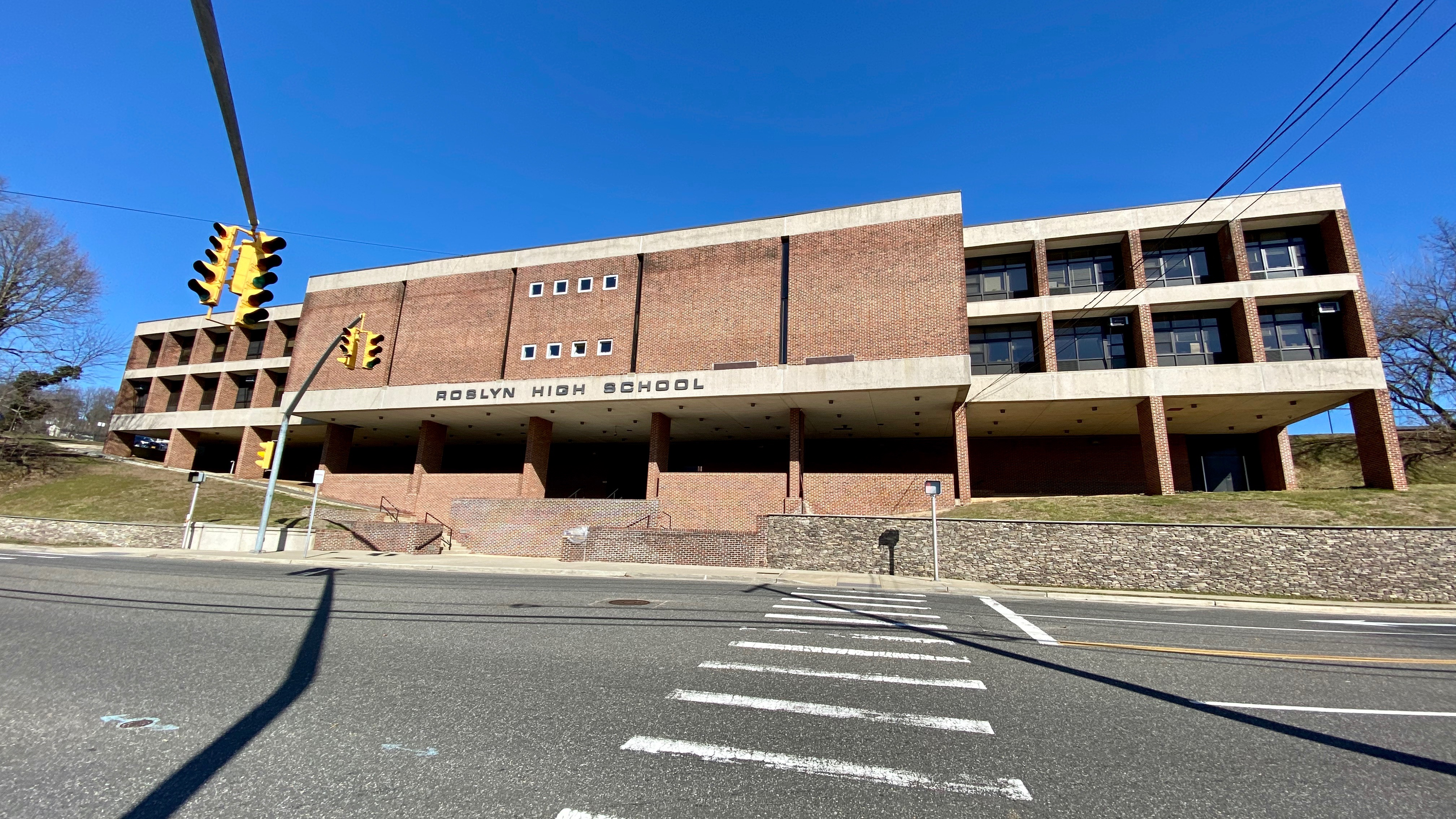
- Roslyn High School, as viewed from Roslyn Road and Lincoln Avenue on March 4, 2020.
- 475 Round Hill Road; Roslyn Heights, New York; United States

Information
- Type: Public High School
- School district: Roslyn Union Free School District
- Principal: Dave Lazarus
- Staff: 96.86 (on an FTE basis)
- Grades: 9–12
- Enrollment: 1,035 (2022–2023)
- Student to teacher ratio: 10.69
- Colors: Blue, white
- Song: "Roslyn High School Alma Mater", written by Ruth Seward and Bradford Frey
- Mascot: Bulldog
- Newspaper: The Hilltop Beacon
- Yearbook: Harbor Hill Light
- Website: hs.roslynschools.org

Roslyn High School is a public high school in Roslyn Heights, in Nassau County, New York, United States. It is the only high school in the Roslyn Union Free School District, serving all of the district's students in grades 9 through 12.

== History ==
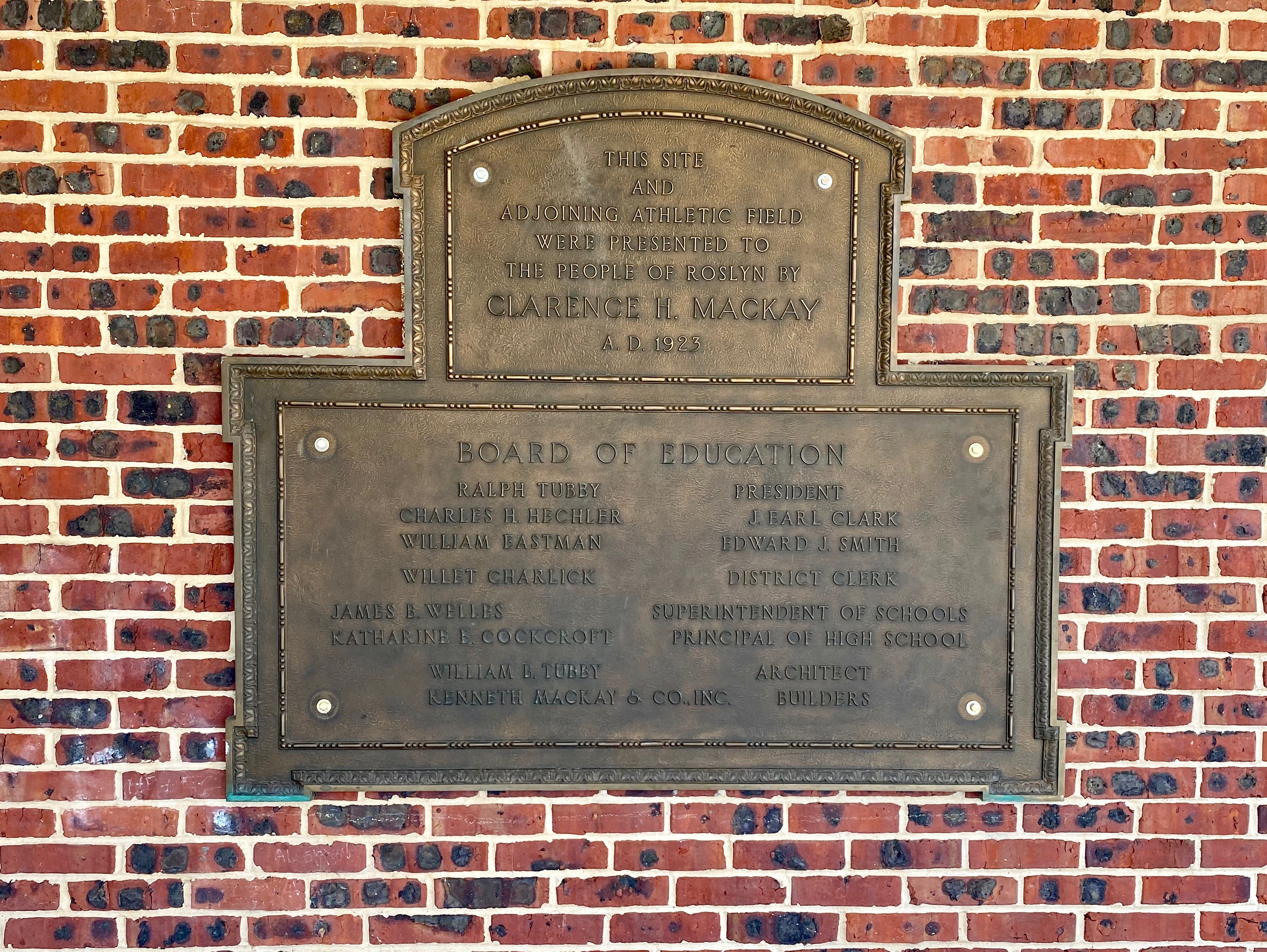
The plaque commemorating the Mackay family's donation of the land that the school sits on.

The property that Roslyn High School sits on was donated in the 1920s by Clarence and Katherine Mackay, both famous figures in Roslyn's history. They owned a large estate in the area, known as "Harbor Hill" (of which the donated land was once part), and a plaque was created to commemorate the land donation. It was originally located in the lobby of the original school building, and is now located on the wall near the replacement building's visitor entrance.

Additionally, Katherine Mackay was the first woman to serve on Roslyn's school board.

=== Original building (1920s–1970s) ===
The original school building opened in 1925, designed by architect William Bunker Tubby in the Colonial Revival style. It consisted of a columned main entrance, adorned on both sides by symmetrical wings. The main entrance was reached by a staircase leading from the intersection of Lincoln Avenue and Roslyn Road. An extension was built off the back of the school in the 1950s during the postwar Baby boom, which stands to this day.

The architect and the district commissioned the Olmsted Brothers to design the landscaping of the school's grounds.

=== Current building (1970s–present) ===
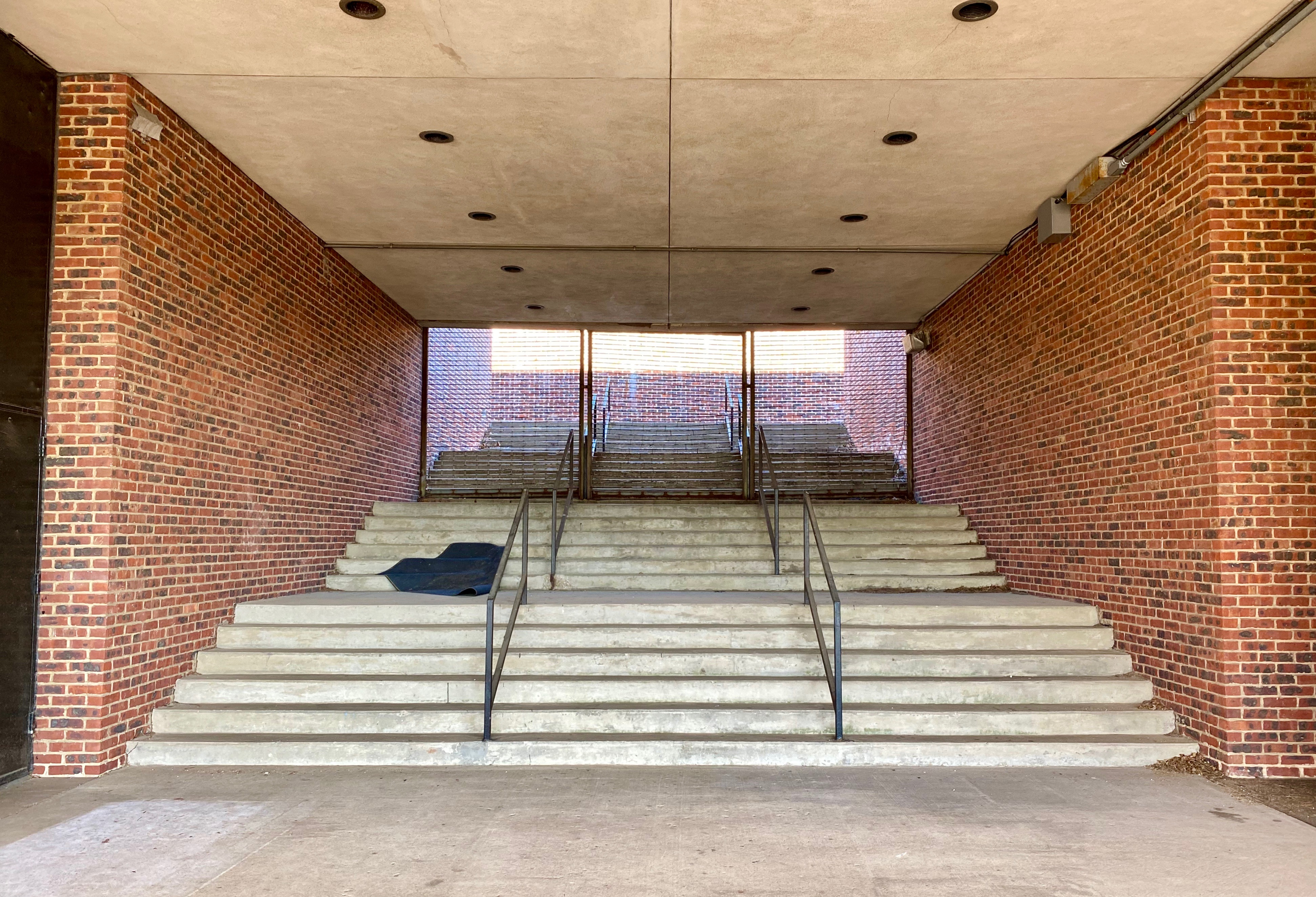
The remaining section of the original school's front staircase.

Between 1970 and 1971, the original, Tubby-designed 1920s school building was demolished and replaced by the current structure, designed by Caudill Rowlett Scott. However, there are numerous remnants of the old building that remain – most notably the middle segment of the stairway underneath the school (which made up the middle section of the original steps up to the original building's main entrance) and the main gymnasium (which was built with the original school for the same purpose). Lecture Room B was the original school's auditorium, and the room behind it was the original stage. The school maintains a collection of historic photographs in "The Commons", including many of the old school.

=== 2004 financial scandal ===
In February 2004, Rebekah Rombom, as editor-in-chief of The Hilltop Beacon, the Roslyn High School newspaper, was preparing the March issue when she was given information that a woman had stolen money from the school district two years earlier, but was allowed to resign quietly without criminal charges.

As Rombom researched the story for her newspaper, she discovered that the woman, who had embezzled at least $250,000, was Pamela Gluckin, the school district's former assistant superintendent for business, but she was told she could not use Gluckin's name in her article. She was also told that she needed to show the article to her principal and the director of community relations before publication; both read it and did not request any changes. The publication of the article in the school's newspaper triggered a full-scale investigation that found officials had embezzled $11.2 million from the district over eight years. Gluckin and Frank Tassone, the superintendent of the school district at the time, eventually pleaded guilty and went to prison.

Former Roslyn student Mike Makowsky dramatized the scandal in the 2019 HBO film Bad Education, starring Hugh Jackman as Tassone and Allison Janney as Gluckin. The film won a Primetime Emmy Award for Outstanding Television Movie.

=== 2010s ===
==== Renovations ====
In the summer of 2017, the district embarked on a major renovation project at the high school, as part of a district-wide modernization initiative. This renovation included completely gutting and renovating the first floor hallways, demolishing, replacing, and expanding the library, constructing an additional gymnasium, installing air conditioning in the world language and math/2nd floor science hallways, reconfiguring the front circle and constructing an entrance plaza (including an awning and vegetation) and security vestibule, expanding and resurfacing the faculty and student parking lots by relocating the district's bus garage to an area adjacent to one of the elementary schools, and creating a student lounge next to the school store. Further renovations were completed during the summer of 2018. Additionally, the center of the front circle would remain the home for one of the marble horse tamer statues from the Mackay estate, which was restored and re-dedicated on October 10, 2019.

=== 2020s ===
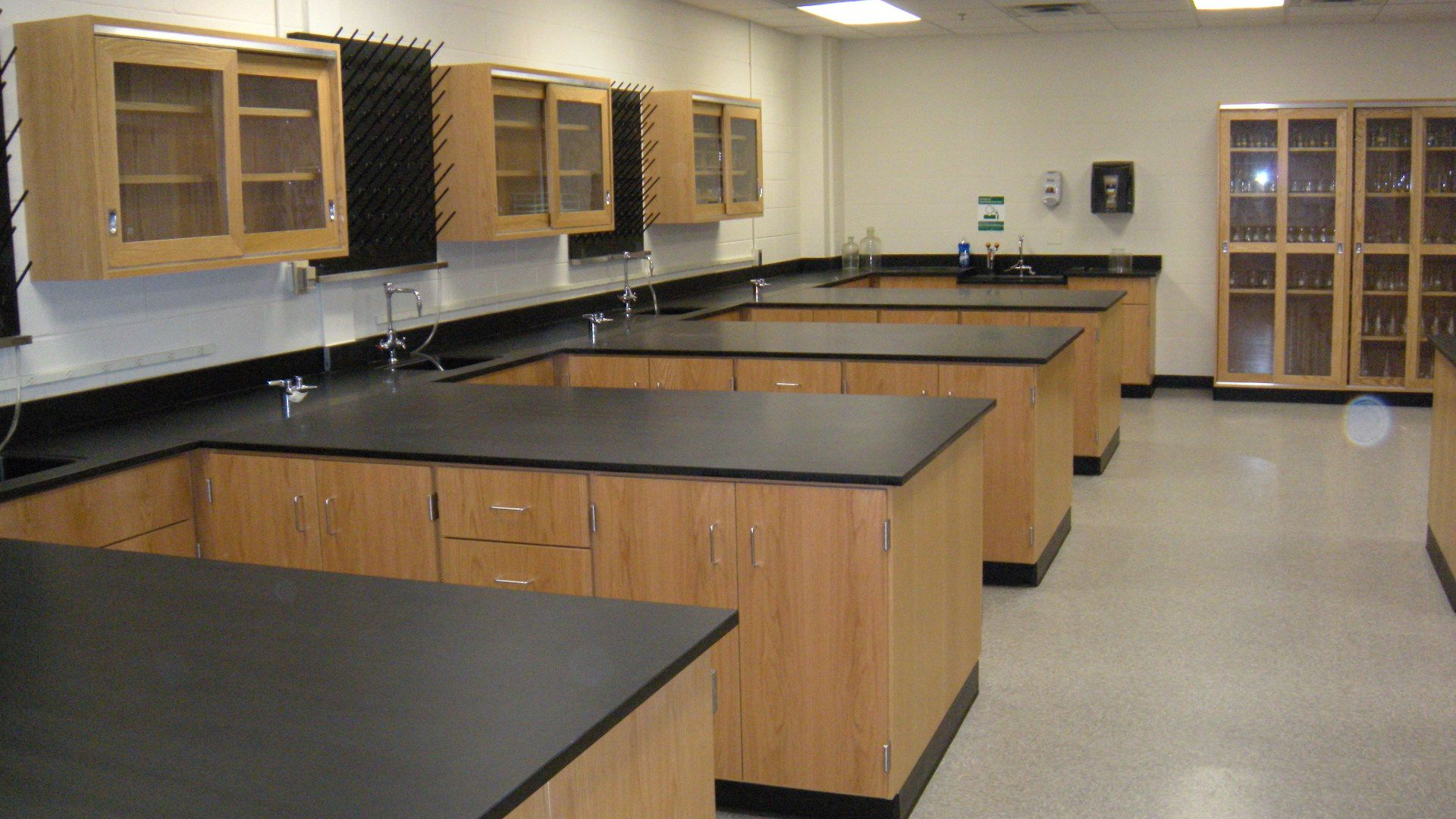
Science labs in Roslyn High School.

In the summer of 2021, Roslyn High School began another set of renovations, but this time with an emphasis on the science wing. Throughout the summer, Roslyn replaced the older, 1970s-style science classrooms with modern, high-tech rooms that encourage more in-depth science experiments and greater ease of teaching. Each classroom was equipped with three screens for teachers to project information onto and had fume hoods to allow for more advanced science experiments. Roslyn also built two new research rooms devoted to allowing students to perform natural science research projects. These multi-million dollar renovations have advanced the capacity for students to engage in science and science-related activities at Roslyn.

== Demographics ==
As of the 2017–2018 school year, Roslyn High School had a total enrollment of 1,038 students, and had 87.04 full-time equivalent classroom teachers. The student/teacher ratio was 11.93-to-1.

Below are various charts that further describe the demographics of the student body as of the 2017–18 school year, using the same public data from the National Center for Education Statistics (NCES):

Breakdown of students, by grade:
Grade	Number of students (2017–18)
9	231
10	277
11	260
12	266
Ungraded	13

Breakdown of students, by gender:
Gender	Number of students (2017–18)
Male	553
Female	485

== Notable alumni ==
- Arthur Agatston – developer of the South Beach Diet
- Deborah Asnis – infectious disease specialist, discovered the first human cases of West Nile virus in the United States
- Michael Crichton – author, film director (The Andromeda Strain, Westworld, Congo, Jurassic Park, etc.)
- Daniel Dorff – classical composer
- Cheryl Machat Dorskind – fine-art photographer
- Howard Gordon – producer and screenwriter (Fox television series, 24)
- Richard Haass – President of the Council on Foreign Relations
- Ken Hechler – fiercely liberal West Virginia congressman, assistant to Harry Truman
- Paul Housberg – artist
- Jesse Itzler – musician, co-founder of Marquis Jet
- Henry Jackson – financier and founder of OpCapita
- William A. Jacobson – Cornell Law professor
- Bobby Kotick – CEO, president, and a director of Activision Blizzard
- Edward S. Lampert – former chairman and CEO of Sears Holdings Corporation
- Ken Langone – founder of The Home Depot, RHS class of 1953
- Wendy Liebman – stand-up comedian
- Andrew Madoff – American financier and son of Bernie Madoff
- Mark Madoff – American financier and son of Bernie Madoff
- Chris Miller – screenwriter and National Lampoon contributor
- Frank C. Moore – artist
- Andrew M. Murstein – founder, board member, president, and largest shareholder of Medallion Financial
- David Nasaw – historian and author
- Peter Pitegoff – Dean, University of Buffalo Law School and University of Maine Law School (2005–2015)
- Mike Pollock (1983) – voice actor
- Michael F. Price – founder of Mutual Series, which merged into Franklin Templeton Investments in 1996
- Darren Rovell – ESPN sports business reporter
- Jen Selter – fitness model
- Gregory B. Starr – UN security chief
- Judith Steinberg, M.D. – physician and wife of Howard Dean, the former Governor of Vermont (1991–2003) and DNC chair (2005–2009)
- Jeff Wilpon – former COO of the New York Mets
- Gary Winnick – philanthropist, financier, and founder of Global Crossing

== Mackay Horse Tamer statue ==
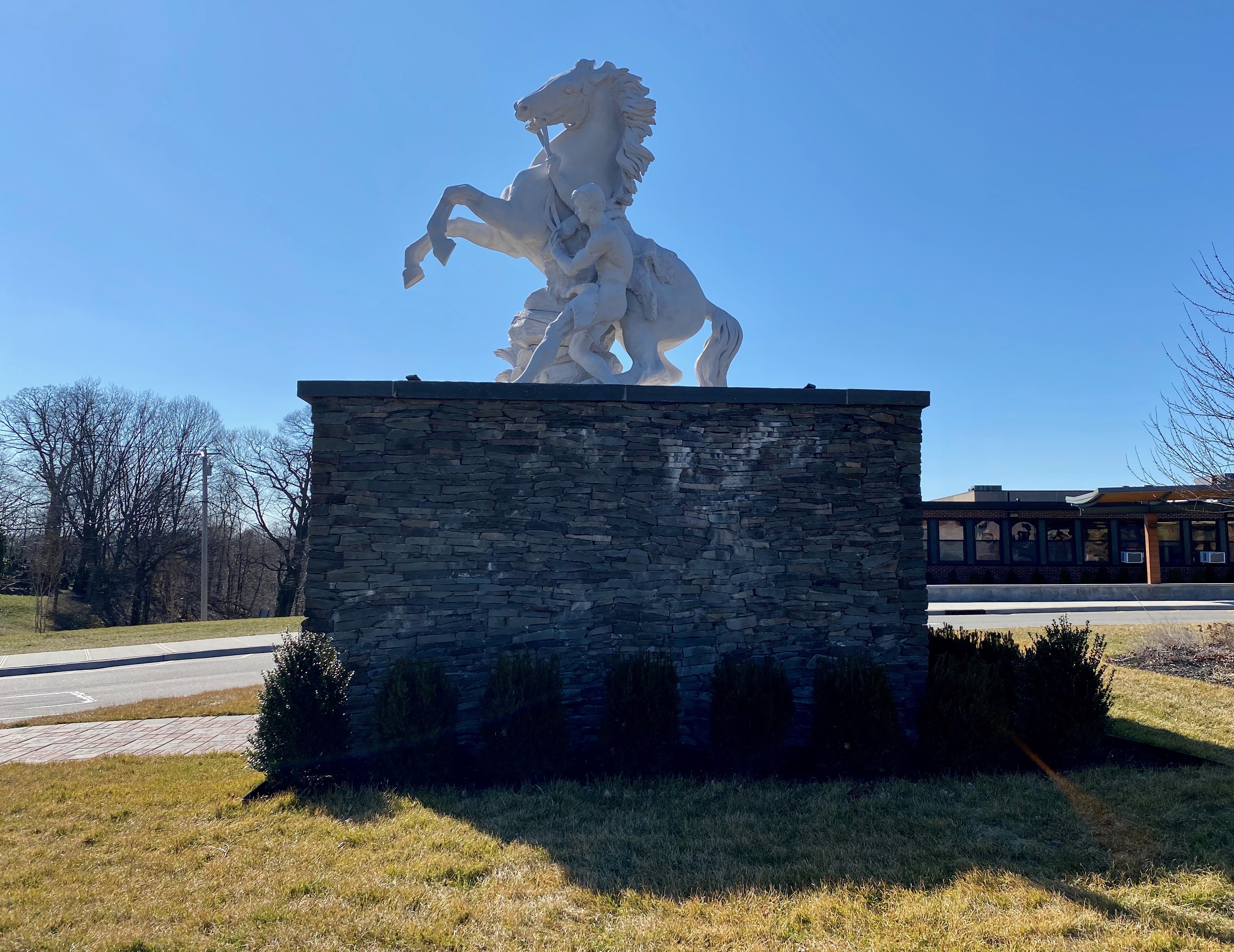
The restored statue in 2020.

As part of the construction of the Mackay estate, Harbor Hill, numerous statues were commissioned – including multiple marble horse tamer statues. After the Mackay estate was demolished, the statue that now resides at the high school was forgotten, only to be stumbled upon years later by a local artist, George Gách. In 1959, the district, at Gách's request, took possession of the Horse Tamer statue to ensure that it be preserved and maintained. The statue was soon restored and installed at Roslyn High School. For many years after the district took ownership, Gách continued to look after and maintain the statue.

In 2012, the statue was temporarily removed from the school for an extensive rehabilitation, as it had been damaged by weathering and vandals. In 2017, the school underwent an extensive modernization, and the front circle was reconfigured. A garden was created in the grassy island of the front circle, with trees, bushes and flowers, and the school's flagpole. The restored statue was made the garden's centerpiece, complete with a new stone pedestal.

The re-dedication ceremony for the restored Horse Tamer statue took place in the front circle of Roslyn High School on October 10, 2019. The ceremony included several speeches and was a major community event.
