= National Institute of Social Sciences =

United States honorary society (e. 1913)

The National Institute of Social Sciences
- Formation: 1913; 113 years ago
- Type: Honorary society
- Headquarters: New York City
- Website: www.socialsciencesinstitute.org

The National Institute of Social Sciences (NISS) is one of the oldest honorary societies in the United States. The stated mission of NISS is to promote the study of the social sciences, to support social science research and discussion, and to honor individuals who have rendered distinguished service to humanity.

NISS is headquartered in New York City.

== Current activities ==
Since 1913, NISS has presented Gold Medals that celebrate the accomplishments of distinguished Americans and world leaders who have contributed at the highest level to the welfare and improvement of society. Gold Medal honorees, which include four U.S. presidents and 16 Nobel Prize winners, represent outstanding achievement in the social sciences, law, government, education, philanthropy, the arts, medicine, science, and industry.

The organization sponsors speaking engagements on critical issues. It supports graduate students in the final stages of completing their dissertations through a grants program.

== Early history ==
The National Institute of Social Sciences traces its origins to the American Social Science Association, or ASSA, which was established in 1865 in Boston as the American Association for the Promotion of Social Science. The ASSA was chartered by an act of the 56th Congress on January 28, 1899. In 1912, the ASSA established NISS as a distinct department. In 1926, when the ASSA dissolved, an act of Congress transferred its congressional charter to the NISS "for the furtherance of the interests of social science."

== Gold Medals ==
The NISS original constitution states the organization's goal "to promote the study of Social Science and to reward distinguished services rendered to humanity, either by election to the National Institute, or by the bestowal of medals or other insignia.”

In 1913 the NISS bestowed its first Gold Medals in recognition of significant contributions to humanity. The first recipients were William Howard Taft, 27th President of the United States, Archer M. Huntington, founder of the Hispanic Society of America, and Samuel L. Parrish, founder of the Parrish Art Museum in Southampton, NY. Each year since 1913, (except for 1922), the organization has presented Gold Medals to distinguished individuals.

The National Institute's Gold Medal was designed by Laura Gardin Fraser, a noted sculptor with a specialty in medals.

=== Honorees ===
1913

- Archer M. Huntington
- Samuel L. Parrish
- William Howard Taft

1914

- Charles W. Eliot
- George W. Goethals
- Abraham Jacobi
- Henry Fairfield Osborn

1915

- Luther Burbank
- Andrew Carnegie

1916

- Robert Bacon
- Helen Hartley Jenkins
- Adolph Lewisohn

1917

- George W. Crile
- William Gorgas
- John Purroy Mitchel
- Mihailo Pupin

1918

- Henry P. Davison
- Herbert Hoover
- William J. Mayo

1919

- Samuel Gompers
- William Henry Welch

1920

- Alexis Carrel
- Henry Holbrook Curtis
- Wilfred Grenfell
- Harry Pratt Judson

1921

- Charles F. Chandler
- Calvin Coolidge
- Marie Curie
- Cleveland Hoadley Dodge

1923

- Charles B. Davenport
- Auckland Geddes
- Emory R. Johnson
- Jean Jules Jusserand
- John D. Rockefeller

1924

- Walter Hampden Dougherty
- Charles Evans Hughes
- Caroline Berryman Spencer

1925

- Mary Williamson Averell (Mrs. Edward H. Harriman)
- William Hallock Park
- Elihu Root
- Owen D. Young

1926

- S. Parkes Cadman
- Clarence Mackay
- Stephen Mather
- Mary Schenck Woolman

1927

- George Pierce Baker
- Walter Damrosch
- Harry Emerson Fosdick
- Adolph Ochs

1928

- Liberty Hyde Bailey
- Robert W. DeForest
- Willis R. Whitney

1929

- Valeria Langeloth
- Rose Livingston
- John D. Rockefeller Jr.
- James T. Shotwell
- Daniel Willard

1930

- Anna Billings Gallup
- George R. Minot
- William Lyon Phelps
- Marcella Sembrich
- Nathan Straus

1931

- Grace Abbott
- Richard Clarke Cabot
- Grace Goodhue Coolidge
- Frank B. Kellogg

1932

- Edward F. Allen
- James Howell Post
- William C. Redfield
- Gerard Swope

1933

- Newton D. Baker
- Clifford W. Beers
- Evangeline Booth

1934

- Eleanor Robson Belmont
- Walter B. Cannon
- Samuel Seabury

1935

- Cornelius N. Bliss
- Harvey Cushing
- Carter Glass
- George E. Vincent

1936

- Nicholas Murray Butler
- Dorothy Harrison Eustis
- William Edwin Hall
- J. Pierpont Morgan

1937

- James Rowland Angell
- Mary Louise Curtis (Mrs. Edward W. Bok)
- J. Edgar Hoover
- Wesley Clair Mitchell

1938

- John W. Davis
- Walter S. Gifford
- Dorothy Thompson

1939

- Martha Berry
- William Church Osborn
- George Wharton Pepper

1940

- Carrie Chapman Catt
- James E. West
- Wendell Willkie

1941

- Norman H. Davis
- Florence Jaffray Harriman
- Al Smith

1942

- Anne O'Hare McCormick
- Donald Nelson
- Rufus B. von KleinSmid

1943

- Madame Chiang Kai-shek Soong Mei-ling
- Edwin Grant Conklin
- Mildred H. McAfee
- Juan Terry Trippe

1944

- Bernard Baruch
- Kate Trumbee Henry Pomeroy Davison
- James G. K. McClure

1945

- Vannevar Bush
- Emily Vanderbilt Sloane (Mrs. John Henry Hammond)
- William Mather Lewis

1946

- Virginia Gildersleeve
- Robert Moses
- Edward Stettinius Jr.

1947

- Edward Johnson
- Katherine Lenroot
- Thomas J. Watson

1948

- Warren R. Austin
- Basil O'Connor
- Georgiana Farr Sibley

1949

- Lillian Moller Gilbreth
- George Catlett Marshall
- Alfred P. Sloan Jr.

1950

- Sarah Gibson Blanding
- Henry Bruere
- Carlos P. Romulo

1951

- Lewis W. Douglas
- John Foster Dulles
- Paul G. Hoffman
- Douglas MacArthur
- Bayard Foster Pope

1952

- Helen Keller
- Robert Abercrombie Lovett
- John J. McCloy
- Harold Raymond Medina

1953

- Jonas Salk
- E. Roland Harriman
- Oveta Culp Hobby
- Charles F. Kettering

1954

- Helen Dinsmore Huntington (Mrs. Lytle) Hull
- Howard Rusk
- Walter Bedell Smith

1955

- Samuel D. Leidesdorf
- Henry Cabot Lodge Jr.
- Elisabeth Luce Moore

1956

- Henry Townley Heald
- Mary Pillsbury Lord
- Clarence G. Michalis

1957

- Billy Graham Jr.
- Alfred M. Gruenther
- Clare Booth Luce

1958

- Marian Anderson
- Robert B. Anderson
- Herbert Hoover Jr.
- James Rhyne Killian Jr.

1959

- Helen Hayes
- Laurance Rockefeller

1960

- Rudolf Bing
- Gilbert Darlington
- Grayson L. Kirk
- Millicent C. McIntosh

1961

- Marie Bullock
- Karl Menninger
- William C. Menninger
- Edward Durell Stone

1962

- Ralph J. Bunche
- Mary I. Bunting
- Lucius D. Clay
- John W. Gardner

1963

- Arthur Dean
- Katharine Elizabeth McBride
- Nathan Pusey
- Frank Stanton

1964

- Bob Hope
- Frederick R. Kappel
- Dean Rusk
- Margaret Chase Smith

1965

- Dorothy Buffum Chandler
- James A. Perkins
- Maxwell D. Taylor

1966

- G. Keith Funston
- Lady Bird Johnson
- Danny Kaye
- David Sarnoff
- Eric Sevareid
- Francis Spellman

1967

- David Rockefeller
- John D. Rockefeller III
- Laurance Rockefeller
- Nelson Rockefeller
- Winthrop Rockefeller

1968

- Eugene R. Black Sr.
- Anne Morrow Lindbergh
- Charles Lindbergh
- Ralph Washington Sockman

1969

- Frank Borman
- Theodore M. Hesburgh
- Lester B. Pearson
- Barbara Ward, Baroness Jackson of Lodsworth

1970

- Katharine Graham
- Lauris Norstad
- William P. Rogers
- Eric Sevareid

1971

- Joan Ganz Cooney
- Charles Malik
- Arthur K. Watson
- Thomas J. Watson Jr.

1972

- George H. W. Bush
- Henry Kissinger
- Mary French Rockefeller
- Fulton J. Sheen

1973

- John P. Flynn
- Jean Kerr
- Paul Moore Jr.
- Elliot L. Richardson

1974

- Peter M. Dawkins
- Golda Meir
- George Shultz
- Roy Wilkins

1975

- Nancy Hanks
- William E. Simon
- Deke Slayton
- Lowell Thomas
- Lowell Thomas Jr.

1976

- Barry Goldwater
- John J. McCloy
- Norman Vincent Peale
- Peter G. Peterson
- Barbara Walters

1977

- John Young (astronaut)
- Anne Armstrong
- Milton Friedman
- Edwin Leather
- Dina Merrill
- Cliff Robertson
- William Rockefeller
- William B. Walsh

1978

- Henrik Beer
- Arthur F. Burns
- Julia Child
- James R. Dumpson
- Lila Acheson Wallace

1979

- McGeorge Bundy
- C. Douglas Dillon
- Jane Pickens
- Linus Pauling

1980

- Omar Bradley
- Alexander M. Haig
- Henry Richardson Labouisse Jr.
- William McChesney Martin Jr.
- William J. McGill
- Iphigene Ochs Sulzberger

1981

- Brooke Astor
- Walter P. Chrysler Jr.
- Jean MacArthur
- Drew Middleton
- John W. Young

1982

- Vernon Jordon
- Claiborne Pell
- S. Dillon Ripley
- Arthur Ross
- Lewis Thomas

1983

- Philip Habib
- John K. McKinley
- Patricia Neal
- Frank E. Taplin
- Marietta Peabody Tree

1984

- J. Peter Grace
- Kitty Carlisle Hart
- Warren H. Phillips

1985

- Hugh Bullock
- Vartan Gregorian
- Jeane Kirkpatrick
- Beverly Sills
- Brian E. Urquhart

1986

- I. I. Rabi
- Juanita Kidd Stout
- Eudora Welty

1987

- John Carter Brown
- Rudy Giuliani
- Vernon A. Walters
- Susan H. Whitmore (Mrs. Harold P. Whitmore)

1988

- James McNaughton Hester
- Paul Volcker
- Caspar Weinberger

1989

- Robert MacCrate
- Philippe de Montebello
- Paul Nitze
- Alice Tully

1990

- Hugh R. K. Barber
- Kathryn Wasserman Davis
- Shelby Cullom Davis
- Angier Biddle Duke
- Moorhead C. Kennedy Jr.
- Thomas R. Pickering
- Dorothy Sarnoff

1991

- Brendan Gill
- Enid A. Haupt
- Joseph Verner Reed Jr.
- William vanden Heuvel

1992

- William F. Buckley Jr.
- Roy M. Goodman
- Arthur M. Schlesinger Jr.
- Richard Boies Stark

1993

- Robin Chandler Duke
- Henry Clay Frick II
- Ellen V. Futter
- August Heckscher II

1994

- Louis Auchincloss
- Kent Barwick
- Mrs. Edward T. Chase
- Daniel Patrick Moynihan

1995

- Peter Flanigan
- Oseola McCarty
- Anne Meyer
- John C. Whitehead

1996

- Madeleine Albright
- Richard Holbrooke
- C. Everett Koop
- James Levine
- Howard Phipps Jr.

1997

- Anthony Drexel Duke
- Richard G. Lugar
- Helen Coley Nauts
- Bill Richardson

1998

- John T. Casteen III
- Abby M. O'Neill
- Jay Rockefeller

1999

- John Kenneth Galbraith
- Arnold J. Levine
- Paul Samuelson
- Nelson Talbot III Strobe Talbott

2000

- Wilhelmina Holladay
- William Luers
- Judith Rodin
- Tom Seaver

2001

- Robert Curvin
- Avery Dulles
- Anna Glen Vietor
- James Wolfensohn

2002

- Bruce Babbitt
- William Joseph McDonough
- John Negroponte
- Judith Shapiro

2003

- Donna de Varona
- Bernard Gersten
- Richard Meier
- Ted Turner

2004

- Kofi Annan
- Peter D. Bell
- Adele Chatfield-Taylor
- Vishakha N. Desai

2005

- John Guare
- Ada Louise Huxtable
- George Rupp

2006

- Lewis B. Cullman
- Hanna Holborn Gray
- John Sculley

2007

- Jacques Barzun
- David McCullough
- Sandra Day O'Connor

2008

- Kenneth T. Jackson
- Robert MacNeil
- Robert M. Morgenthau

2009

- Doris Kearns Goodwin
- Thomas L. Haskell
- Eric Kandel

2010

- Agnes Gund
- Garrison Keillor
- Margaret Mead (in memoriam)

2011

- Chuck Close
- Donald Henderson
- James Q. Wilson

2012

- Robert Caro
- Paul Goldberger
- William M. Manger

2013

- John H. Adams
- Wallace Smith Broecker
- Arthur Ochs Sulzberger Jr.

2014

- Eric Foner
- Philippe Petit
- E.O. Wilson

2015

- John C. Bogle
- Paul Krugman
- Michelle Kwan

2016

- Pauline Newman
- Richard L. Ottinger
- Robert D. Putnam

2017

- Ron Chernow
- Robert J. Shiller
- Michael I. Sovern

2018

- Daniel Kahneman
- Geraldine Kunstadter
- Elizabeth Barlow Rogers

2019

- Paul Farmer
- Peter Gelb

2020

- Max Stier
- Darren Walker
- Judy Woodruff

2021

- Henry Louis Gates Jr.
- Amartya Sen
- Kwame Anthony Appiah

2022

- Philip J. Landrigan
- Jennifer J. Raab
- Neil deGrasse Tyson

2023

- Jonathan Fanton
- Anthony Stephen Fauci
- James H. Simons
- Marilyn H. Simons

2024

- Ken Burns
- David Remnick
- Bryan Stevenson

2025

- Christopher Eisgruber
- Claudia Goldin
- Alison Gopnik

== Research support ==
In its first two decades, the National Institute published an annual Journal of the National Institute of Social Sciences, which included articles by members and scholars. The 1920 journal, for example, included articles by the noted economist and sociologist Thorstein Veblen and academic Virginia Gildersleeve.

In the 1970s, the National Institute supported a national project on experiential education. The project was begun in 1974 by Frank Pace Jr., the NISS president, to strengthen field experiential education and support the NISS's "original mission and function."

== Grants and scholarships ==
In 2011 the Institute began awarding Dissertation Grants (originally called Seed Grants) to graduate students completing dissertations in social science fields. To date, 30 unrestricted grants have been awarded.

== Advisory Council ==
In 2022, NISS President Fred Larsen and the Board of Governors established the first Advisory Council, composed of former Gold Medal Honorees, leading scholars in the social sciences and cognate fields, leaders of educational and not-for-profit institutions focused on the social sciences, and distinguished artists, journalists, and performers whose work affects and is concerned with the advancement of knowledge and the betterment of society. The Inaugural Council consists of

- Kwame Anthony Appiah
- Paul Boghossian
- Peg Breen
- Anthea Butler
- Anthony Roth Costanzo
- Henry Louis Gates Jr.
- Andrew H. Delbanco
- Christopher Eisgruber
- Jonathan F. Fanton
- Henry Louis Gates, Jr.
- James Grossman
- Kenneth T. Jackson
- Nancy Kidd
- Philip J. Landrigan
- Edward Liebow
- Louise Mirrer
- Jennifer Raab
- Elizabeth Barlow Rogers
- Max Rudin
- Amartya Sen
- Steven Rathgeb Smith
- Max Stier
- Stacy Wolf
- Judy Woodruff
