= Academy of American Poets =

American literary organization

- Formation: 1934; 92 years ago
- Founder: Marie Bullock
- Type: Nonprofit
- Purpose: Promoting poets and poetry
- Location: U.S.
- Website: poets.org

The Academy of American Poets is a national, member-supported organization that promotes poets and the art of poetry. The nonprofit organization was incorporated in the state of New York in 1934. It fosters the readership of poetry through outreach activities such as National Poetry Month, its website Poets.org, the syndicated series Poem-a-Day, American Poets magazine, readings and events, and poetry resources for K–12 educators. In addition, it sponsors a portfolio of nine major poetry awards, of which the first was a fellowship created in 1946 to support a poet and honor "distinguished achievement", and more than 200 prizes for student poets.

In 1984, Robert Penn Warren noted that "To have great poets there must be great audiences, Whitman said, to the more or less unheeding ears of American educators. Ambitiously, hopefully, the Academy has undertaken to remedy this plight." In 1998, Dinitia Smith described the Academy of American Poets as "a venerable body at the symbolic center of the American poetry establishment." In 2013, Carolyn Forché described the Academy of American Poets as "the most important organization in our country helping to keep poetry alive and in our culture."

== History ==
The Academy of American Poets was created in 1934 in New York City by 23-year-old Marie Bullock with a mission to "support American poets at all stages of their careers and to foster the appreciation of contemporary poetry." In 1936, the Academy of American Poets was officially incorporated as a nonprofit organization. Marie Bullock was the president of the Academy of American Poets for the next half a century, running the organization out of her apartment for thirty of those years. In 1982, Marie Bullock received a Mayor's Award of Honor for Arts and Culture. She also had received the Gold Medal of the National Institute of Social Sciences, the Award for Distinguished Service to the Arts from the National Institute of Arts and Letters.

Since its earliest days, the Academy of American Poets has been guided by an honorary Board of Chancellors composed of established and award-winning poets who serve as advisors to the organization and judge its largest prizes for poets. Past Chancellors include W. H. Auden, Elizabeth Bishop, Lucille Clifton, Robert Creeley, Marianne Moore, Mark Strand, and May Swenson. Women as well as men were founding poets of the Academy; for example, Florence Hamilton.

As of 2018, the fifteen Chancellors of the Academy of American Poets are: Elizabeth Alexander, Ellen Bass, Marilyn Chin, Kwame Dawes, Forrest Gander, Linda Gregerson, Terrance Hayes, Brenda Hillman, Marie Howe, Khaled Mattawa, Marilyn Nelson, Alicia Ostriker, Claudia Rankine, Alberto Ríos, and David St. John.

As of 2020, Michael Jacobs chairs the Board of the Academy of American Poets.

The Academy of American Poets administers several programs: National Poetry Month; the website Poets.org, which includes a curated collection of poems and essays about poetry, more than 800 recordings and videos of poets dating back to the 1960s, and free materials for K–12 teachers, including lesson plans; the syndicated series, Poem-a-Day; and American Poets magazine. The organization also awards nine major prizes for poets, as well as 200 college awards sponsored at schools across the country.

In 1998, Fred Viebahn, husband of African-American poet Rita Dove, drew media attention to the lack of diversity on the Academy's Board of Chancellors; up until then, no poet of color had ever been elected to be a Chancellor, and only very few women. Subsequently, two female chancellors, Maxine Kumin and Carolyn Kizer, resigned in protest. The Academy responded by instituting major changes and designating several new chancellors, including African-American poets Lucille Clifton and Yusef Komunyakaa.

Elizabeth Kray was hired in 1963 as the first executive director of the Academy of American Poets, and she served the organization until 1981. William Wadsworth served as executive director from 1989 to 2001.

In January 2020, the Academy received a grant of $4.5 million from the Andrew W. Mellon Foundation, in addition to the $2.2 million provided in 2019. The money will be used for the poet laureate program.

In 2023, the organization named its first Latino executive director and president, Ricardo Alberto Maldonado.

== Awards given by the Academy of American Poets ==
Awards are listed in chronological order of their creation.

=== Academy Fellowship ===
One Academy Fellowship is awarded annually for "distinguished poetic achievement": Fellows are awarded a stipend which is presently $25,000. The Fellowship program was created in 1946, and was the first of the organization's current portfolio of awards; the Academy's website Poets.org describes it as "the first of its kind in the United States".

=== James Laughlin Award ===
Formerly known as the Lamont Poetry Selection, the Laughlin Award is given in recognition of a poet's second published book, and is considered to be the only major award honoring the publication of a poet's second book.

The award was first established in 1954 by a bequest from the wife of Thomas W. Lamont, who specified that it be used "for the discovery and encouragement of new poetic genius." In 1959, Harvey Shapiro referred to the award as "roughly, a Pulitzer for bardlings". Initially, the Lamont Poetry Selection was awarded to a poet's first published book; copies of the book were purchased from its publisher for distribution to the Academy's members. In 1975, the organization changed to selecting a poet's second volume; in an editorial, Peter Davison welcomed the change, suggesting that publishing a second volume was becoming more difficult than publishing the first.

In 1995, it was endowed by a gift from the Drue Heinz Trust, and it was renamed to honor James Laughlin, who founded the publishing house New Directions in 1936. At present, winners receive a cash prize of $5,000, an all-expenses-paid weeklong residency at The Betsy Hotel in Miami Beach, Florida, and the Academy of American Poets purchases one thousand copies of the winning book for distribution to its membership; the purchase and distribution essentially guarantee that the book becomes "a bestseller in the tiny poetry market".

Edward Field described the importance of receiving the Award to his career as follows:

... perhaps it is just as well that I didn't succeed in getting a publisher earlier, since, with new poems being added all the time, the manuscript kept getting stronger. But years of rejection took their toll, and when I won the Lamont Award in 1962, I kept repeating "I will not be consoled." But I was. My life changed considerably. For one thing, I could make a living - I gave poetry readings around the country, wrote narrations for a couple of documentary films, translated a book of Eskimo poems, and, yes, even taught poetry workshops for a while.

— Edward Field

Several of the Award's recipients have subsequently won the highest honors given to mature poets. Donald Hall was named Poet Laureate of the United States in 2004. Donald Justice, Lisel Mueller, Philip Schultz, and Tracy K. Smith have each won the Pulitzer Prize for Poetry.

=== University and college poetry prizes ===
The Academy first began awarding annual $100 prizes to student poets at ten American universities and colleges in 1955. The program has since expanded to include more than 200 schools. According to the Academy, most of these prizes are endowed in perpetuity, though some are funded through other arrangements with the school or through private donors. For a school to become part of the program, a $2,500 endowment contribution is required. Individual schools set the winning criteria for their awards, within the guidelines set by the Academy: winners must be registered students at the school and the school cannot restrict the themes or styles of the entries.

=== Lenore Marshall Poetry Prize ===
The Lenore Marshall Poetry Prize is awarded annually for the best volume of poetry written by a living U.S. citizen and published in the previous year in the United States. The Prize was created in 1975 by the New Hope Foundation of Pennsylvania, which was a philanthropic foundation created by Lenore Marshall and her husband, James Marshall, to "support the arts and the cause of world peace"; Lenore Marshall, a poet, novelist, editor, and peace activist, had died in 1971.

The Prize was initially administered by the Saturday Review magazine. Following the folding of Saturday Review, the Prize was administered by The Nation magazine. In 1995, administration of the Prize became the responsibility of the Academy of American Poets; the Prize has a permanent endowment, and the cash value of the prize is currently $25,000.

The Academy of American Poets currently announces three judges for each year's competition in advance. There has been some criticism of the Academy's procedures for mitigating the judges' conflicts of interest, since the judges are often acquainted with some of the poets whose volumes are nominated.

=== Walt Whitman Award ===
Named after poet Walt Whitman, the award is based on a competition of book-length poetry manuscripts by American poets who have not yet published a book. It has been described as "a transformative honor that includes publication and distribution of the book though the Academy, $5,000 in cash and a residency at the Civitella Ranieri Foundation." The Library of Congress includes the Award among distinctions noted for poets, as does The New York Times, which also occasionally publishes articles about new awards.

The award was established in 1975. In a New York Times opinion piece from 1985, the novelist John Barth noted that 1475 manuscripts had been entered into one of the Whitman Award competitions, which exceeded the number of subscribers to some poetry journals. From 1992 to 2014, Louisiana State University Press published each volume as part of its "Walt Whitman Award Series" Beginning 2015, Graywolf Press published the winning manuscript. The Academy purchases and distributes copies to its members, along with copies of the winning volume for the James Laughlin Award.

=== Harold Morton Landon Translation Award ===
This $1,000 award recognizes a poetry collection translated from any language into English and published in the previous calendar year. Established in 1976, it is given annually. A noted translator chooses the winning book.

=== Wallace Stevens Award ===
Named for Wallace Stevens, the award was established in 1994 by Dorothea Tanning to "recognize outstanding and proven mastery in the art of poetry". Nominations are not accepted. The winner, who must be an American citizen, is chosen by the Academy of American Poets Board of Chancellors and receives $100,000.

=== Raiziss/de Palchi Translation Awards ===
Established in 1995, the award seeks to recognize American translators for "outstanding translations into English of modern Italian poetry" that have been published through non-self-publication means. The prize alternates annually between a straight $10,000 book price and a fellowship at the American Academy in Rome and $20,000 for use in advancing a "significant work-in-progress", such as through travel or study. The award is administered for The New York Community Trust and funded by a bequest from Sonia Raiziss Giop.

=== Aliki Perroti and Seth Frank Most Promising Young Poet Award ===
Established in 2013, the Aliki Perroti and Seth Frank Most Promising Young Poet Award recognizes a student poet who is twenty-three years old or younger, with an annual cash prize of $1,000.

=== Ambroggio Prize ===
Established in 2017, the Ambroggio Prize is the only annual award of its kind in the United States that honors American poets whose first language is Spanish. It is a $1,000 publication prize given for a book-length poetry manuscript originally written in Spanish and with an English translation. Luis Alberto Ambroggio sponsored the prize to "celebrate poets in the United States writing in Spanish as an important part of our rich American poetic tradition."

=== Poets Laureate Fellowships ===
In 2019, the Academy of American Poets launched the Academy of American Poets Laureate Fellowship, which provides poets laureate from states, municipalities, and tribal nations around the United States with $50,000 to support the creation of new work, and enable them to undertake civic projects that enrich their communities.

=== Past awards ===
Past awards include the Copernicus Award (from 1974 to 1977), the Edgar Award (from 1974 to 1977), and the Peter I. B. Lavan Younger Poets Award (from 1983 to 1994).

== See also ==
- Killing of Renée Good
