= Roslyn Union Free School District =

School district in the U.S. state of New York

- Official seal

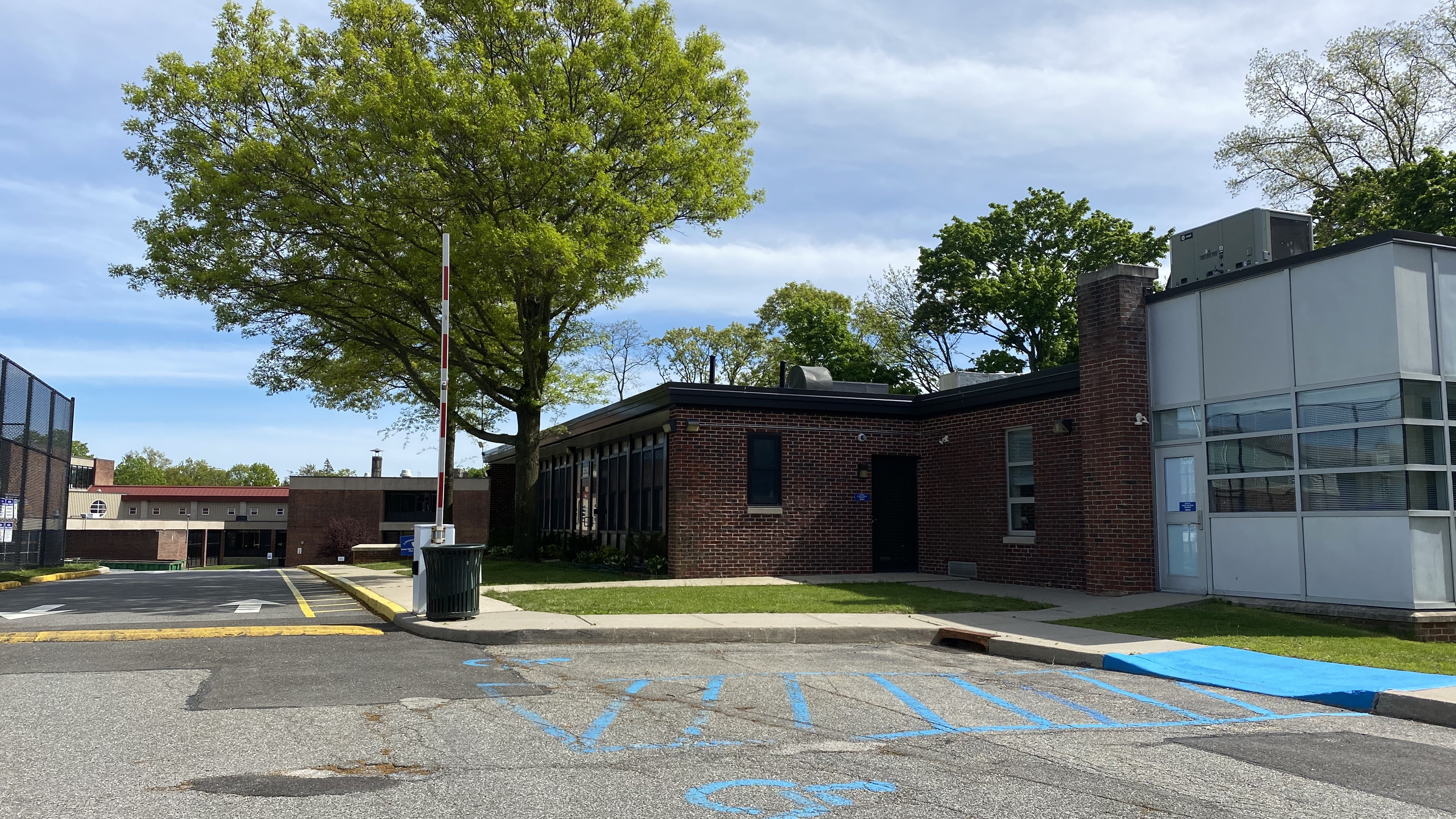
- The district's central administration building, located adjacent to Roslyn High School

Address
- 300 Harbor Hill Road Roslyn, New York 11576; United States

District information
- Type: Public
- Grades: PK-12
- Established: December 1, 1904
- Superintendent: Allison Brown
- Schools: 5
- NCES District ID: 3625050

Students and staff
- Students: 3,162 (as of 2017–18)
- Staff: 272.33 (as of 2017–18)
- District mascot: Bulldog
- Colors: Blue, white

Other information
- Website: https://www.roslynschools.org/

The Roslyn Union Free School District (also known as Union Free School District No. 3 and more commonly known as Roslyn Public Schools or simply Roslyn School District) is an American public school district located in Nassau County, on Long Island in New York, United States.

The district serves the entirety of the villages of Roslyn and Roslyn Estates, in addition to parts of the villages of East Hills, Flower Hill, North Hills, and Roslyn Harbor, and parts of the hamlets of Albertson, Glenwood Landing, Greenvale, and Roslyn Heights.

== History ==
=== Origins ===
The school district was founded on December 1, 1904, when the Roslyn Union Free School District's charter was officially signed and enforced.

In the early 20th Century, segregation in America's public schools was still common practice – even in northern parts of the nation. The Roslyn school district was segregated from its 1904 founding until circa 1917, when the district became racially integrated. This was earlier than many other school districts in the nation; for comparison, schools only a few miles west in New York City were segregated until being outlawed there in 1920.

In the first two decades of its existence, over 100 students – an average of over five students per year – from all over the Roslyn area had graduated.

After 1912, the Heights School replaced a one-room schoolhouse, which was located nearby. It remains in active use today as one of the district's elementary schools.

=== The 1920s, the Mackays, and the Horse Tamer ===
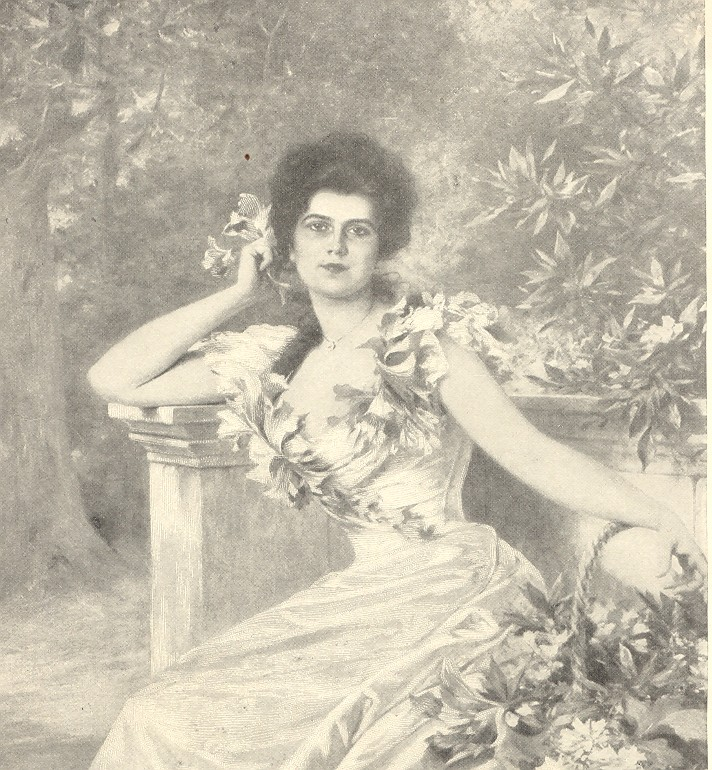
Katherine Duer Mackay – the first woman to serve on Roslyn's school board

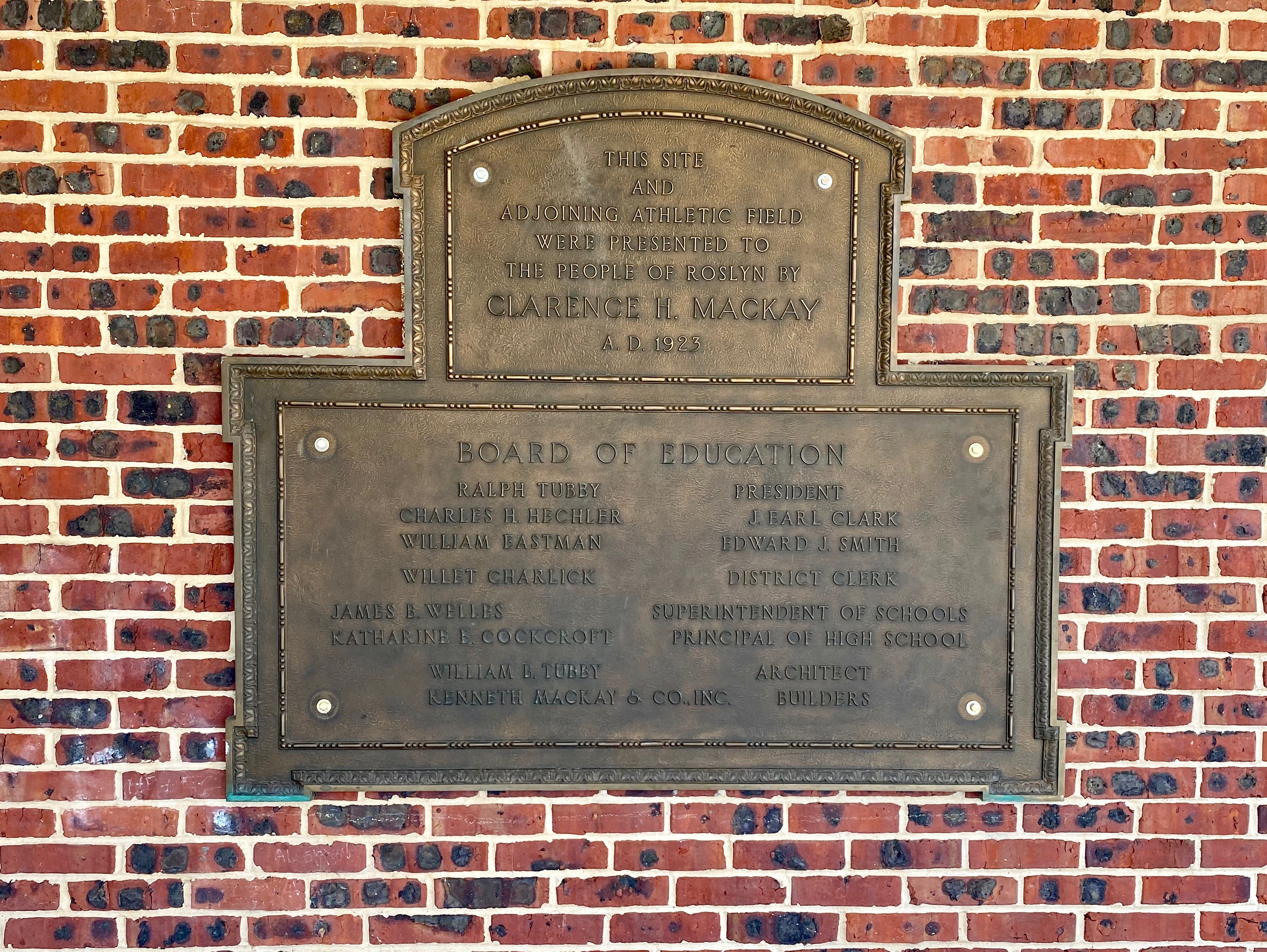
A plaque at Roslyn High School, noting the donation of land to the district by the Mackay family

In 1923, wealthy Roslyn couple Clarence and Katherine Mackay donated a portion of their estate, named "Harbor Hill" for the hill of the same name that it sat on, to the school district. This land became the current location of Roslyn High School and its athletic fields, and a new high school opened on that piece of land in 1925 and was designed in the Colonial Revival Style by architect William Bunker Tubby, a relative of a family in town. A plaque commemorates the donation, and was located in the lobby of the original high school. After the building was replaced by the current high school structure in 1970–1971, the plaque was placed in storage for many years. It was re-installed by the visitor entrance of the high school in 2020.

One of the marble Horse Tamer statues from the Mackay estate was given to the district in the 1950s by a local artist, George Gách, to ensure its preservation.

Additionally, Katherine Mackay was the first woman to serve on the district's school board.

"It is necessary for the rich as well as the poor to patronize them [public schools]."

— Katherine Duer Mackay

In 1927, the Village School was destroyed in a fire, and a third and final structure for that school was soon erected in its place.

=== The Baby-Boom Era (Mid-20th Century) ===
Following the Second World War, the United States saw a population boom and the rise of mass suburbanization. Roslyn was no exception to this. In the late 1940s and early 1950s, new Roslyn housing developments were built, including Strathmore at Roslyn (currently part of the Village of East Hills), built by Levitt & Sons, and Westwood (also part of the Village of East Hills), built by the Westgate Building Corporation. Given the influx of new residents and students within the district's boundaries, a handful of new schools were built, in addition to a major building expansion off of the back of the high school.

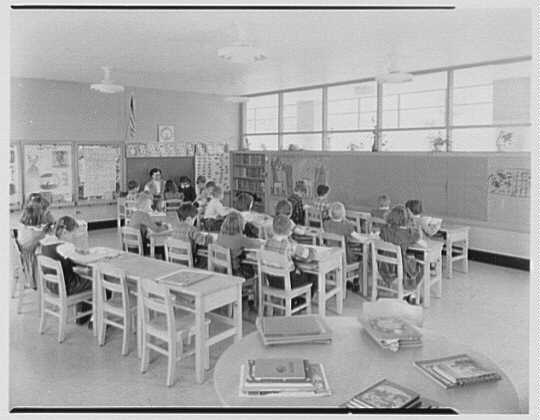
A class inside of the former Highland Elementary School in 1953

Five schools opened as a result of this boom: East Hills Elementary School, Roslyn–Flower Hill Elementary School, and Roslyn Highland Elementary School in the early 1950s; Roslyn Junior High School (now Roslyn Middle School) in the late 1950s, and Harbor Hill Elementary School in the early 1960s. Of these 5 schools, the ones that remain in use are East Hills Elementary School (currently serving grades 2–5), Harbor Hill Elementary School (currently serving grades 1–5), and Roslyn Middle School (currently serving all students in grades 6–8).

Roslyn Junior High School opened in 1957 as the southernmost school in the district, located just north of the Northern State Parkway and the district's southern border, and just south of what is now the Long Island Expressway (Interstate 495) and its eastbound service road (Powerhouse Road). The Long Island Expressway reached Roslyn a year later, in 1958, replacing former NY 25D with a limited-access highway. As a result, Roslyn Middle School is the only school in the district to be south of the Long Island Expressway.

1967 saw the district's highest number of enrolled students, with nearly 4,500 students attending the district's schools.

=== After the Baby Boom (the 1970s, 1980s, & 1990s) ===
At the end of the baby-boom era, school districts nationwide saw huge enrollment drops, given the population trends of the time. Roslyn was no exception. As a result, four of Roslyn's elementary schools were closed from the mid-1970s through the early 1980s.

The four schools closed during this time: Roslyn–Flower Hill Elementary School and Roslyn Village School were demolished and were replaced by housing; North Roslyn Elementary School was sold and became the Nassau BOCES Iris Wolfson High School; and Roslyn Highland Elementary School was sold and was used as a temple and later a church.

In 1987, Roslyn Junior High School became Roslyn Middle School.

The 1990s saw another increase in enrollment numbers - albeit at a slower and steadier pace. This trend would continue into the 2000s.

=== 2004 financial scandal ===
As editor-in-chief of The Hilltop Beacon, the Roslyn High School newspaper, Rebekah Rombom was preparing the March 2004 issue when she learned that a woman, who had stolen money from the school district two years prior, had been allowed to resign quietly without facing criminal charges.

As Rombom researched the story for her newspaper, she discovered that the woman, who had embezzled at least $250,000, was Pamela Gluckin, the school district's former assistant superintendent for business, but she was told she could not use Gluckin's name in her article. She was also told that she needed to show the article to her principal and the director of community relations before publication; both read it and did not request any changes. One of the interviews conducted by Rombom was with then-superintendent Frank Tassone, who was eventually implicated as a co-conspirator.

Once published, the article prompted the opening of a criminal investigation, which led to the indictments of Gluckin and Tassone – both of whom initially pleaded not guilty. In 2005, a state audit was issued by then-New York State comptroller Alan G. Hevesi, which detailed the full extent of the financial abuses by the top officials of the school district from 1996 to 2004. The investigation found that officials had stolen US$11.2 million (equivalent to $19.1 million in 2025) from the district, and that at least 26 other officials besides Tassone and Gluckin had benefited from the embezzlement.

Tassone, eventually pleaded guilty, and in 2006, the then 60-year-old was sentenced to 4 to 12 years in prison. He was released in February 2010 and as of 2020 was still receiving an annual state pension of $173,495, as the New York State constitution guarantees that promised public employee retirement benefits cannot be diminished or taken away, even for convicted felons. Gluckin pleaded guilty and was sentenced to 3 to 9 years behind bars; she was released in 2011 and received half of her state pension. The other half, about $21,000 per year, was pledged to the school district as part of her repayment of the funds that she stole.

In the next school board election, voters replaced four of the seven board members, along with the president of the board. Additionally, in a May 2004 vote, the community rejected the school and library budgets; this was the first time in over 20 years that the school budget was voted down, and the only time in the Bryant Library's history.

A revised budget ($78 million, reduced from $82 million) was proposed, and passed in a vote in July 2004.

On April 25, 2020, Bad Education, a film based on the scandal, premiered on HBO, where it won an Emmy Award for Outstanding Television Movie.

=== 2004 Centennial celebration ===
2004 also marked the 100-year anniversary of the Roslyn Union Free School District's charter. During the 2004 Homecoming, the high school and district celebrated this milestone year with displays of school and community spirit.

On December 1, 2004, exactly 100 years to the date of the signing and enforcement of the district charter, the Roslyn Union Free School District celebrated its centennial with a community celebration in front of the administrative building. Students from the Heights School recited the Pledge of Allegiance, which was immediately followed by the singing of "The Star-Spangled Banner", in addition to other patriotic hymns. Members of Roslyn High School's Organization of Class Councils (the school's student government) were also present at this celebration to represent the high school's students, and the district's then-director of community relations, Barry Edelson, composed and recited a speech to honor the occasion.

The district released a special calendar for the 2004–2005 school year to celebrate the centennial, which included a large collection of historic school district photos, many of which were provided to the district by the Bryant Library, located in the village.

=== Capital plans and renovations ===
In 2005, Roslyn voters approved of a $5 million capital plan, using extra budgetary funds that were recovered following the financial scandal. This was followed in 2006, when $4.1 million was added to capital expenditures by Roslyn voters, using funds recovered from the many legal cases against the guilty members of the embezzlement case. Given the fact that the funds for these projects were recovered, there were no additional increases in property taxes for funding these plans.

The money allocated in each of these capital programs went to fixing and renovating the roofs, building façades, plumbing, fields, and blacktops, in addition to upgrades to playgrounds, technology, and the safety and security systems. Furthermore, the high school's auditorium and science labs each received enhancements, as well.

As part of these capital programs, the high school's auditorium received an extensive renovation, which included lighting upgrades, installing a new roof, refinishing the panels, installing new curtains and carpeting, and reupholstering and restoring the seats, which were originally made for the former Roxy Theater (closed in 1960), and installed in the high school's auditorium when it was built in the late 1960s. The renovated auditorium re-opened in January 2007, in time for the high school's winter concerts, featuring the high school's chorus, wind ensemble, and string orchestra.

In 2007, the athletic field at the high school received major enhancements through a $650,000 grant from the Roslyn Bulldogs Booster Association, including the installation of an artificial turf field. These renovations were completed in time for the 2007 Homecoming.

In February 2009, work began on an energy performance initiative, with the goal of lowering the district's energy consumption costs and carbon emissions, which was completed in 2010. This included the installation of solar panels on the roofs of the middle and high schools, replacing lights and installing light sensors in classrooms, replacing existing boilers and water heaters with more efficient versions, heating system enhancements, computer energy mitigation systems, and insulating windows and doors. This project, funded through a contract, had no negative impacts on local property taxes.

In 2011, Roslyn High School opened a new cafeteria, which replaced both existing ones. The wall separating the main cafeteria and the snack bar was taken down, lighting was enhanced, seating capacity was increased, and multimedia, electronic, and technological upgrades were made. Additionally, the lunch menus were overhauled, and an outdoor patio was opened for students in the adjacent courtyard. These upgrades enabled the school to gain multipurpose space and cafeteria efficiency, and special school and district events and meetings are often held here.

In 2013, Roslyn High School's field facilities were overhauled and expanded, including the construction of a new field house, providing more restrooms for athletes and spectators, in addition to adding storage space. Funds for this project were provided through the Roslyn Bulldogs Booster Association, the school district's capital reserve funds, and a New York State legislative grant, and the project was completed and opened in time for the September 28 Homecoming.

==== 2014 capital budget ====
In May 2014, Roslyn voters voted in favor of a $41.3 capital budget, which included money allocated for extensive facility modernizations, extensions, and various other improvements. The ceremonial groundbreaking for the first of these projects occurred in April 2016. Additionally, The improvements that are part of this modernization are listed below.

Heights School

- Relocating the library, main entrance, and main office to a new location on the Carlyle Place side of the building to improve accessibility.
- Relocating parking spaces and adding additional lawn space and landscaping improvements.
- Upgrades to the cafeteria.

East Hills Elementary School

- A rebuilt front entrance, a new security vestibule, and a new entrance canopy.
- Renovations to the library.
- Upgrades to the drop-off area, parking lot, and playing fields.

Harbor Hill Elementary School

- A new entrance canopy, entrance vestibule, and security vestibule.
- A new multipurpose room.
- Upgrades to the playing fields, landscaping, and the removal of the tennis courts.
  - These upgrades have now downgraded and the fields are not good anymore according to the students
- Renovations to the library.

Roslyn Middle School

- Drainage and parking lot improvements.
- No other major construction took place at the middle school during this time, given that it received major upgrades and extensions not too long before.

Roslyn High School

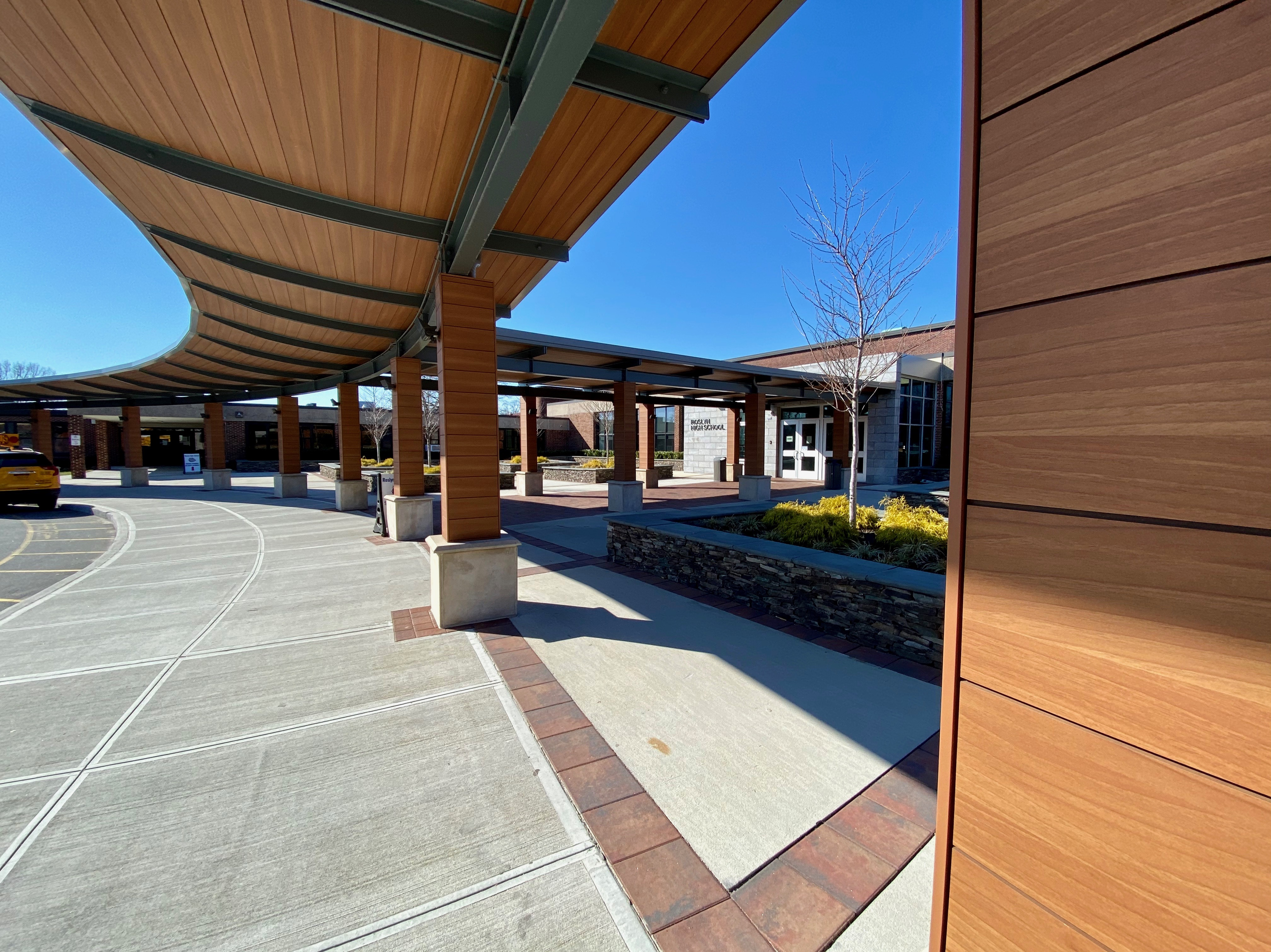
The renovated main entrance and security vestibule to Roslyn High School, along with the new canopy and plaza

- Reconfiguring the parking lot to improve traffic flow and add parking spaces, including creating a new faculty parking lot on the site of the former bus garage.
- Improved landscaping.
- A new library and an additional gymnasium.
- A new entry plaza, main entrance and security vestibule, and canopy.
- A new service delivery area.
- A new seating area adjacent to the main entrance.
- A new greenhouse.
- Renovations to the boys locker room; girls locker room renovations were deferred until 2019–2020.

The old bus garage, located at the high school, was demolished and was relocated to a new structure adjacent to the District Facilities Building by Harbor Hill Elementary School.

All schools received lighting improvements, hallway and classroom renovations and reconfigurations, safety and security enhancements, air conditioning to all major meeting spaces that lacked it, in addition to second floor classrooms, electrical capacity improvements, improved outdoor lighting, fences, doors, and pavement/sidewalk repairs.

In 2019, voters approved of the 2019–2020 school budget, which included updated signage and the approval of renovating the high school science labs and the girls locker room. Furthermore, plans were made to purchase additional school busses, in addition to updating the playgrounds at Harbor Hill Elementary School and the Heights School.

==== The Horse Tamer restoration ====
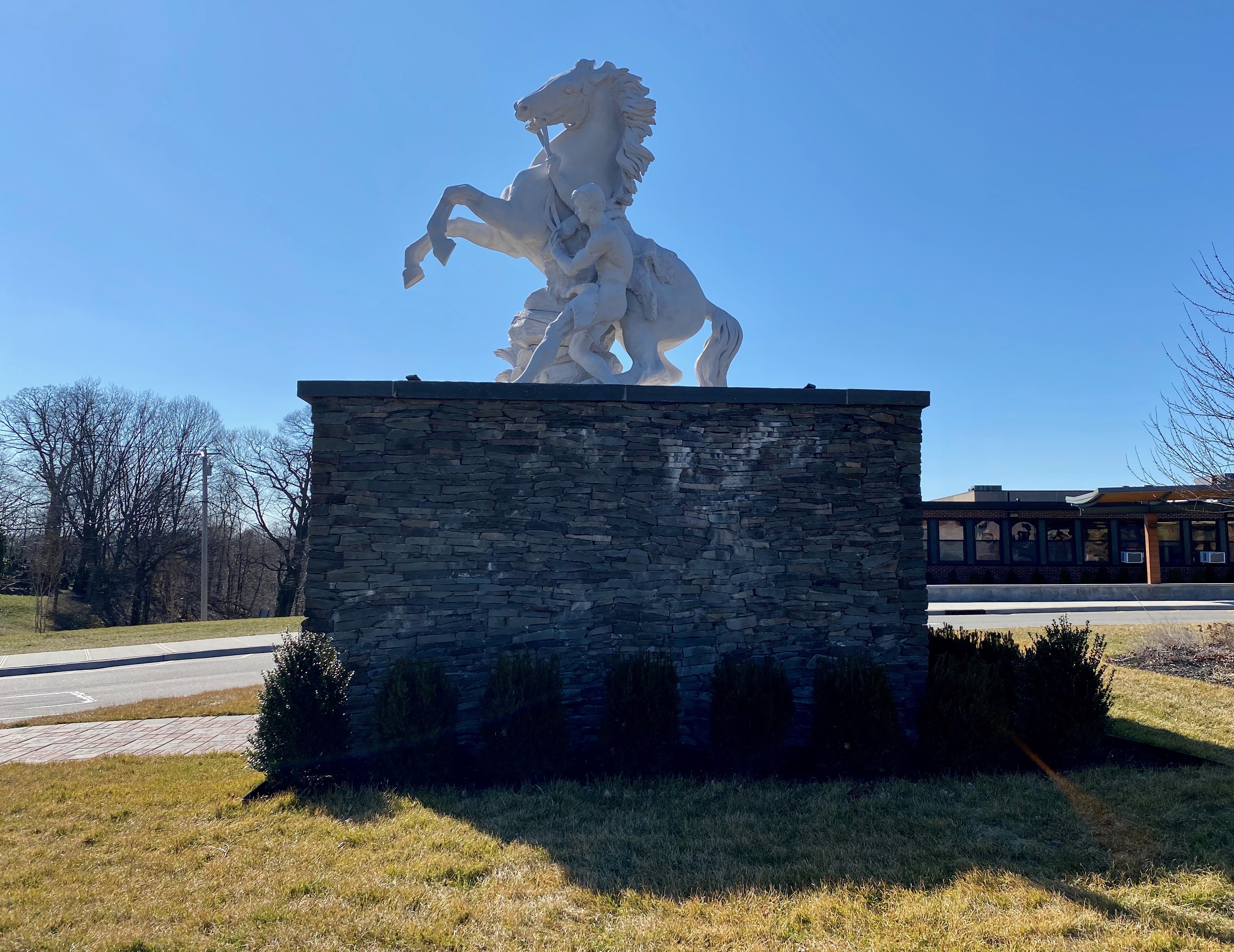
The restored Mackay Horse Tamer in front of Roslyn High School in 2020

In 2012, the Horse Tamer in front of the high school was temporarily removed so it could be preserved and restored, as it had severely deteriorated over the years from weather and vandalism, to a lesser extent.

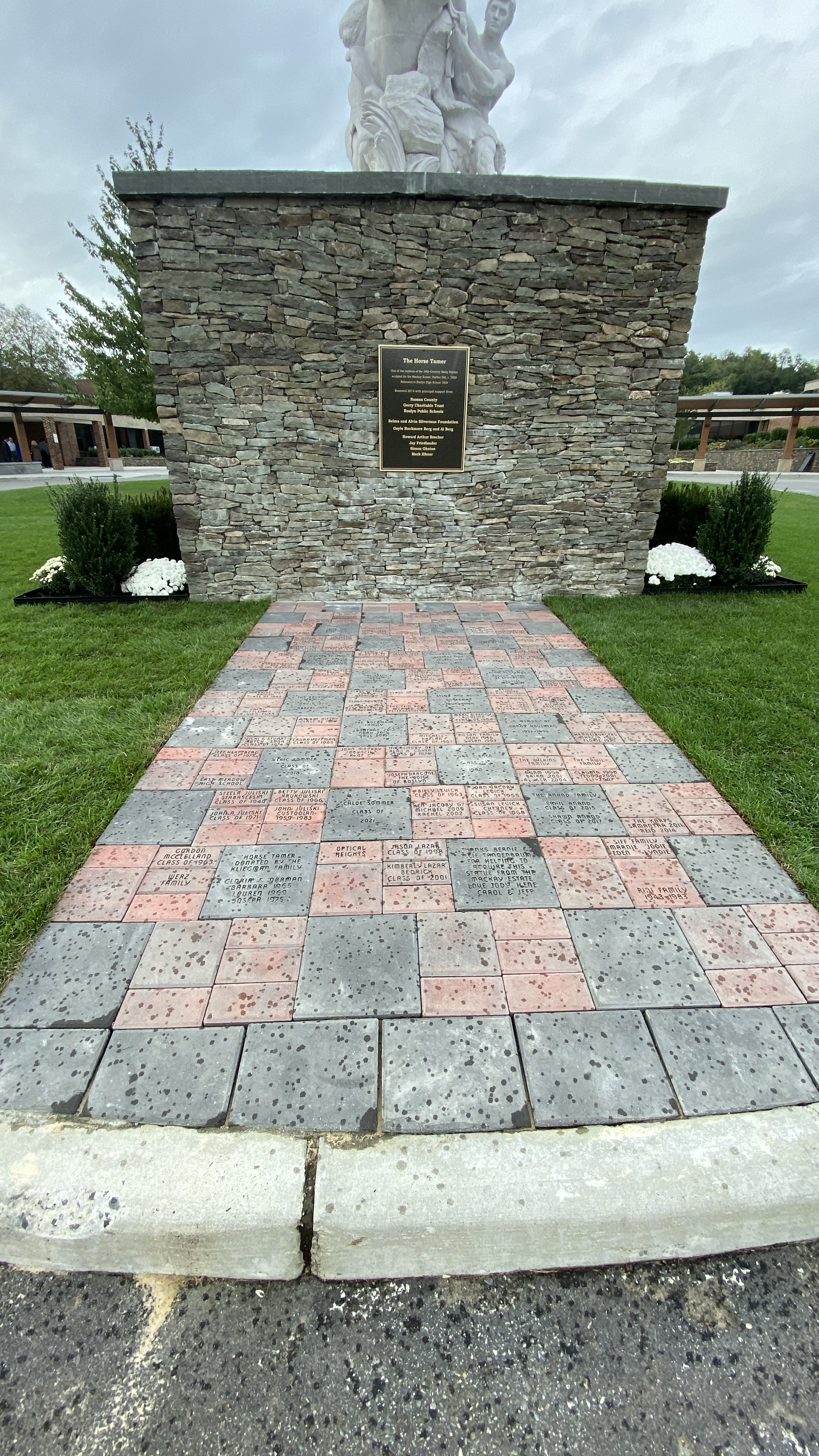
The commemorative bricks and bronze plaque in the plaza for the Horse Tamer statue in 2019

In 2019, after receiving its restoration, the marble Horse Tamer was welcomed back home with a major, historic community celebration. During the celebration, historic speeches were made by Meryl Waxman Ben-Levy, the President of the Board of Education, Allison Brown, the Superintendent of Schools, Barry Edelson, the Director of Community Relations, Barbara Silverman-Berke, the President of Friends of the Horse Tamer, and Andrew Antenberg, the President of the Organization of Class Councils (OCC), which is the student government of Roslyn High School.

Roslyn High School's band and chorus both participated in the festivities, as well, by playing tunes by Irving Berlin, the Mackay's son-in-law. The band played "Always", and was directed by Frank Mauriello. Following this, the band accompanied the chorus, led by Cyndi Feinman, in "America the Beautiful"; the chorus also sang "God Bless America" during the ceremony.

Following the ceremony, a reception with was held, with refreshments provided by the Coordinating Council of Parent Associations and Roslyn High School Parent Faculty Association.

Commemorative bricks on the ground in front of the statue honor the people and organizations that contributed to the restoration efforts, and the key contributors are listed on a bronze plaque, which is mounted on the pedestal.

=== Recent history ===
In the days following Hurricane Sandy in 2012, the district opened the high school's cafeteria as a warming and food center for the community, as many places around the community were still awaiting the restoration of electricity and heat.

In 2013, the district began to issue iPads to students in the high school, and was the first on Long Island to issue a device to all of their high school students for education purposes. This was done partially as an educational initiative and partially as a budgetary one, and enabled students to learn in a more interactive, versatile way, and gave teachers additional ways of teaching. This move had no impact on property taxes, and instead was funded by the money saved on textbooks and paper; the amount of annual copies made district-wide were cut in half. In 2018, the district began exploring the use of Chromebooks as potential replacements for the iPads, in addition to continuing to replace the district SmartBoards with Epson BrightLink boards.

Roslyn's special education programs serve individuals between 3 and 21 years of age. These programs have received enhancements, as well, and the implementation of sensory rooms for special education students has been discussed by administrators.

Throughout the school board meeting on February 15, 2018, one day after the school shooting in Parkland, Florida, Roslyn's administrators and board members spoke of the tragedy, and vowed to improve security throughout the district. At the next meeting on March 8, it was announced that the district would be making further upgrades to the district's security systems. This included upgrading the security hardware and technology across the district, adding additional security guards and vehicles, and various other enhancements.

==== Response to COVID-19 ====
On March 13, 2020, the decision was made to close schools and utilize remote learning for the week of March 16–20, as a precautionary measure to combat COVID-19, and perform a deep cleaning of busses and facilities during that time. The next week, Governor Andrew M. Cuomo informed the public that schools would remain shut until March 27. These closures were extended multiple times across New York until May 1, when it was announced that schools would remain closed for the remainder of the school year. Additionally, the district cancelled the Roslyn Summer Academy for Summer of 2020.

As a tribute to the graduating seniors in Roslyn High School's Class of 2020, the district switched on the lights for the school's athletic field at 8:20 PM Eastern Time (20:20 Military Time), as a means of showing solidarity and support from the district.

Due to the social distancing mandates, a normal graduation was not possible. As a result, the district put on special parades for the seniors, in addition to a virtual "Senior Sunset", continuing the tradition virtually.

After it was announced by Governor Cuomo that socially-distanced, in-person graduations could take place, the district organized 8 individual, live graduations for the senior class on the high school's football field, which took place June 22, 23, 24, and 25, 2020. Two ceremonies took place each morning, and, as per social distancing guidelines, the ceremonies were limited to graduates and immediate family members (parents/guardians and siblings). Additionally, the district held a virtual graduation ceremony on Friday, June 26, 2020.

As a result of social distancing guidelines, it was announced that the 2020–2021 school budget vote and board election on June 9, 2020, would take place by mail-in ballot only. The deadline was later extended until June 16, 2020, and saw the largest voter turnout in over a decade. The 2020-2021 school budget was passed by a wide margin, and saw the re-election of incumbents Meryl Waxman Ben-Levy and Clifford Saffron as president and vice president, respectively.

The approved, $115,330,236 2021 budget includes a 1.89% increase in spending, a projected tax levy increase of 1.83% (which is within the allowable limit of 3.58%), and the continued maintenance of instructional services and programs. The approval of the propositions doesn't have any additional impact on local taxpayers.

== Administration ==
As of the 2019–2020 school year, the superintendent of schools is Allison Brown and the Board of Education president is Meryl Waxman Ben-Levy.

As of the 2025-2026 school year, this remains unchanged.

== Schools ==
Map of the Roslyn School District's schools, as of 2026

=== Current ===
The school district currently operates 5 schools (3 elementary, 2 secondary). The map denotes the locations of the current schools, along with the district's service boundary.

School		Location	Grades	Opened	Notes
Roslyn High School, as viewed from Lincoln Avenue and Roslyn Road	Roslyn High School	Roslyn Heights	9–12	1925	E on map
Roslyn Middle School, looking towards the main entrance	Roslyn Middle School	East Hills	6–8	1957	D on map
East Hills Elementary School, looking towards the front circle and main entrance	East Hills Elementary School	East Hills	2–5	1951	C on map
Harbor Hill Elementary School, looking towards the sign with the school's name adjacent to the main entrance plaza	Harbor Hill Elementary School	East Hills	1–5	1961	B on map
The Heights School, looking towards the front circle	Roslyn Heights School	Roslyn Heights	PK–1	1912	A on map

=== Former ===
Map of the Roslyn School District's former schools

School		Location	Grades	Opened	Closed	Notes
The former site of the Roslyn–Flower Hill Elementary School in 2020, as viewed from Center Drive. The land was sold and developed for single-family homes. Note part of the school's old fence and the faded school district sign on it behind the bushes at right.	Roslyn–Flower Hill Elementary School	Flower Hill		1952	1980	A on map; Demolished; site redeveloped as multiple single-family homes
	North Roslyn Elementary School	Greenvale		1912	1975	D on map; Sold; building now in use as the Nassau BOCES Iris Wolfson High School
	Roslyn Highland Elementary School	Roslyn Estates	K–4	1950	1972	C on map; Sold, and the building became a temple, before becoming a church
	"Old" Roslyn Village School	Roslyn	1–12	1898	1927	E on map; Burned down; site currently a parking lot for Kyma, a local Greek restaurant
The former site of the Roslyn Village School in 2020, as viewed from Mackay Way	"New" Roslyn Village School	Roslyn		1932	1976	B on map; Demolished; site redeveloped as multiple single-family homes

== The Roslyn Summer Academy ==
The Roslyn Summer Academy is an academic summer program run by the district for students ranging from as young as kindergarten through the end of middle school. The program is free for all students, and there have been recent talks over extending the program's length.

== Demographics ==
The tables below display the school district's demographic data for the 2018–2019 school year, made available by the National Center for Education Statistics (student-teacher ratio, number of FTE teachers, and the total number of students) and the New York State Education Department (all other data):

Breakdown of students, by gender:
Gender	Number of students (2025–2026)
Female	1,625 (49%)
Male	1.703 (51%)

Breakdown of students, by race/ethnicity:
Race/ethnicity	Number of students (2024–25)
White	1,952 (59%)
Black	98 (3%)
Hispanic	323 (10%)
Asian/Pacific Islander	859 (26%)
Native American	4 (0.12%)
Two or More Races	93 (3%)

Breakdown of students eligible for free or reduced-price lunch:
Program	Number of students (2017–18)
Free Lunch	345 (11%)
Reduced-Price Lunch	71 (2%)

Additionally, as of the 2017–2018 school year, there were 3,162 students and 272.33 full-time equivalent teachers, making for an average student-teacher ratio of 11.61 students to 1 full-time equivalent teacher.

Everyone in the 2025-2026 year has free lunch.

== See also ==
- List of school districts in New York
- Roslyn High School
- List of Long Island public school districts and schools
