= Mary Ellin Barrett =

American writer (1926–2022)

- Born: Mary Ellin Berlin; November 25, 1926; New York City, U.S.
- Died: July 16, 2022 (aged 95); New York City, U.S.
- Education: Barnard College
- Occupation: Writer
- Spouse: Marvin Barrett (m. 1952; died 2006)
- Parent(s): Irving Berlin; Ellin Mackay
- Relatives: Clarence Mackay (maternal grandfather)

Mary Ellin Barrett (née Berlin; November 25, 1926 – July 16, 2022) was an American critic and memoirist, the eldest of three daughters of composer Irving Berlin and Ellin Berlin (née Mackay).

== Life and career ==
Barrett was born and grew up in New York City, where she attended the Brearley School. She then went to Barnard College, majoring in music. After graduation, she began to work for Time Magazine, where she met her future husband, Marvin Barrett. She was the book critic for Cosmopolitan Magazine, where she worked very closely with Helen Gurley Brown.

Barrett was the author of three novels: Castle Ugly was published in 1966, followed by An Accident of Love in 1973 and American Beauty in 1981. Her last publication was a memoir entitled Irving Berlin: a Daughter's Memoir, which was released in May 1995.

Barrett resided in Manhattan, where she died on July 16, 2022, aged 95.
