= Marvin Barrett =

American writer (1920–2006)

Marvin Galbraith Barrett (May 6, 1920 – August 19, 2006) was an American author and educator known as an authority on broadcast journalism.

== Life and career ==
Barrett was born in Des Moines, Iowa. His father, Edwin, was a radio actor and taught communications at Drake University. Barrett graduated from Harvard University in 1942 with a bachelor's degree in English literature. He served in the United States Navy from 1942 to 1946. In 1952 Barrett married Mary Ellin Berlin, daughter of Irving Berlin.

Barrett worked as a contributing editor to TIME and Newsweek magazines, executive editor of Show Business Illustrated, and managing editor of Show Magazine.

For many years, Barrett was the director of the DuPont-Columbia Survey of Broadcast Journalism. He received the Sigma Delta Chi Award for distinguished journalism for its 1975 report Moments of Truth. He received a master's degree in English from Drake University in 1976.

A near-death experience in 1984 inspired Barrett to keep journals, and resulted in his 1999 book Second Chance: A Life After Death.

Barrett died in Manhattan as a result of congestive heart failure.

== Bibliography ==
- Meet Thomas Jefferson (1967, Random House Children's Books, ISBN 0-394-90067-7)
- The Politics of Broadcasting (1973, Crowell, ISBN 0-690-64696-8)
- Moments of Truth (1975, Crowell, ISBN 0-8152-0370-5)
- The End of the Party (1976, Putnam, ISBN 0-399-11745-8)
- Rich News, Poor News (1978, Crowell, ISBN 0-690-01741-3)
- The Eye of the Storm (with Zachary Sklar, 1980, Lippincott & Crowell, ISBN 0-690-01876-2)
- Broadcast Journalism, 1979-1981 (editor, 1982, Everest House, ISBN 0-89696-160-5)
- Spare Days (1988, Arbor House, ISBN 1-55710-006-3)
- Second Chance: A Life After Death (1999, Parabola, ISBN 0-930407-42-3)
