= Marie Bullock =

American nonprofit president

- Born: 1911; Paris, France
- Died: December 25, 1986 (aged 75); New York City, U.S.
- Education: Sorbonne, Columbia University, Juilliard School
- Occupations: Nonprofit president and founder
- Organization: Academy of American Poets
- Spouse: Hugh Bullock

Marie Bullock (1911 – December 25, 1986) was an American nonprofit leader, known for founding the Academy of American Poets and serving as its president for almost fifty years.

== Early life and education ==
Marie Leontine Graves was born in Paris, France in 1911 to American parents. Her mother was a singer, while her father was a banker. Although her father was half French and half Irish, he didn't learn to speak French as well as her mother did. Her father taught her how to drive a car and shared financial advice, as well as the trait of methodical task completion to ensure they would be done right. Graves loved poetry from a young age. She attended graduate studies at the Sorbonne.

In 1933, she married Hugh Bullock, an investment banker, and moved to New York City in the United States. Soon after moving to the U.S., she took classes on economics and poetry at Columbia University. She also studied at the Juilliard School of Music.

== Career ==
After moving to New York, Bullock was concerned to find that American poets did not receive the same support or recognition as those in Europe. She recalled that during her course on poetry with Joseph Auslander at Columbia, an esteemed poet's visit had to be cancelled because he couldn't get the day off from work as a soda jerker. Bullock contrasted this with how her family had respected musicians and other artists during her childhood. She felt inspired to change how the U.S. supported a culture of poetry, and began speaking with poets and businessmen to try to design an effective support system for poets. She wanted to help them achieve more financial stability and cultural success.

Bullock founded the Academy of American Poets in 1934 to serve as a literary organization to support poetry and poets in the U.S. She wanted the foundation to last for a long time and nurture personal connections over a wide geographic area, so she decided that establishing it as a membership corporation would help it achieve both goals. She organized it so that separately from the donating members, the foundation had 12 chancellors who controlled the group's artistic decisions. The chancellors worked independently and elected other poets to serve as chancellors as they left their posts.

Bullock handled the association's funds and business decisions. She also promoted the organization, giving speeches and lectures on poetry and in the foundation's support. One of her early speeches occurred in Chautauqua, New York in the summer of 1937. In 1939, Bullock became the president of the academy she had founded, a post she held until her death in 1986.

At the beginning, small donors could become founders by donating any amount, while donors who gave $1000 or more could become voting members. There were no voting members for a while after the organization's founding, with few people donating in large amounts. All the funds were saved into a trust fund, which they grew throughout World War II. At this time, they also raised funds for initial awards to support poor poets, with recipients voted on by the chancellors. The first awardee was Edwin Markham, and the second Edgar Lee Masters. The academy's trust fund grew large enough after World War II to support fellowships and broader programming. This began a pair of annual poetry awards, initially for $5,000 but later for $10,000, and supported fees to the chancellors to support their service to the foundation.

In 1954, the foundation began a college anthology program for ten colleges, later growing to over 100. That same year, Florence Haskell Corliss Lamont's bequest to the academy founded the Lamont first-publication prize, and her donations funded it for the next 20 years until other donors supported it. The foundation added other prizes over time and supported readings for poets at all levels of fame. Bullock helped start the organization's Poets in the Schools program in 1966, reportedly following the advice of Robert Frost.

In 1983, Bullock presided over a year of events commemorating the foundation's 50th anniversary. These included a reception for several hundred poets at the Gracie Mansion, hosted by Mayor Ed Koch and sponsored by the City of New York. The foundation and the New York Institute of the Humanities held a week of tribute events for W. H. Auden that year. The Library of Congress also created a two-day poetry festival in Washington D.C., and the New York Public Library created an exhibition to honor the foundation.

=== Other associations ===
Bullock was also a board member for other cultural organizations. She was a director of the MacDowell Colony, and the Theodore Roosevelt Association. She served as a former Governor of the Colony Club and was on the Council of Fellows for the Pierpont Morgan Library. She was also an ex-officio member of the President's Committee on the Arts for the John F. Kennedy Center and a member of the Advisory Committee on Cultural Affairs for New York City. She also served as a director for her husband Hugh's firm, Calvin Bullock Ltd.

== Personal life and death ==
Bullock and her husband Hugh had two daughters, Fleur and Fair Alice. She was an astronomer and had been a member of the Teachers Astronomy Course of the Hayden Planetarium, as well as the British Astronomical Association. She served on the visitors committee of the Department of Astronomy at Harvard College.

Bullock died on December 25, 1986, from cancer. Her funeral was held at Saint Thomas Church in Manhattan.

== Legacy and awards ==
Writer Maria Popova described Bullock as visionary, and the academy as "the country's most spirited champion of poetry as a force of beauty, truth, and cultural upheaval." Other poets have reportedly called Bullock the "Joan of Arc of American Poetry." Poet Anthony Hecht wrote in her tribute that Bullock "was a gallant, devoted, and generous champion of a cause that had few champions before her, and none so successful. American poets and their readers are all in her debt."

=== Awards and honors ===
In 1948, Bullock received the King's Medal for service in the cause of freedom.

In 1961, she earned the Gold Medal from the National Institute of Social Sciences. In 1963, the National Institute of Arts and Letters gave her the Distinguished Service to the Arts award.

In 1975, Bullock was made Dame of the Order of St. John of Jerusalem.

In 1982, Bullock received a Mayor's Award of Honor for Arts and Culture. Bullock was named Honorary Chairman of the American Poets' Corner in the Cathedral of St. John the Divine in New York City during the 1980s.

Williams College awarded Bullock an honorary doctorate of humane letters.
