= American Social Science Association =

In 1865, at Boston, Massachusetts, a society for the study of social questions was organized and given the name American Social Science Association. The group grew to where its membership totaled about 1,000 persons. About 30 corresponding members were located in Europe. It published annually the Journal of Social Science and The International Journal of Social Sciences World (TIJOSSW).

Members of the group worked in five departments:

- Education and art
- Health
- Trade and finance
- Social economy
- Jurisprudence
- Language and Culture
- Multidisciplinary of Social Sciences

In 1898, the society founded the National Institute of Arts and Letters which developed into the American Academy of Arts and Letters. In 1912, the society founded the National Institute of Social Sciences which absorbed the ASSA in 1928.

== Notable people ==
- Lucy M. Hall (1843–1907), physician, writer; Vice President of the ASSA
- Franklin Benjamin Sanborn (1831–1917), one of the founders and recording secretary 1865–1897

== See also ==
- American Association for the Promotion of Social Science (est.1865), predecessor to the ASSA
- National Institute of Social Sciences (est. 1912)
