= Ellin Berlin =

American writer (1903–1988)

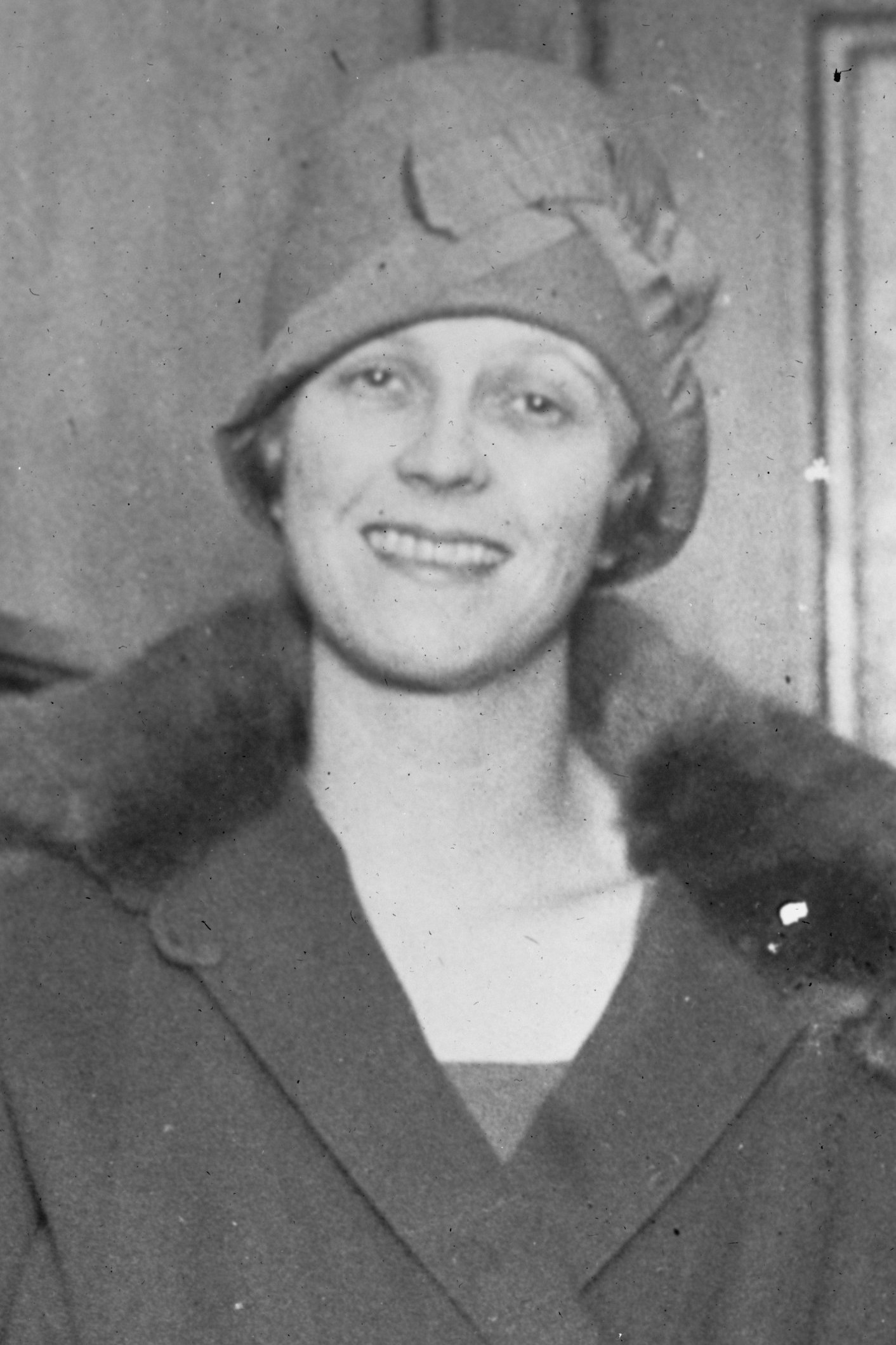
- Berlin c. 1926
- Born: Ellin Mackay; March 22, 1903
- Died: July 29, 1988 (aged 85)
- Occupation: Author
- Spouse: Irving Berlin (m. 1926)
- Children: 4, including Mary Ellin
- Parent(s): Clarence Mackay; Katherine Duer Mackay

Ellin Berlin (née Mackay; March 22, 1903 – July 29, 1988) was an American author. She was married to Irving Berlin.

== Biography ==
Ellin's parents were financier Clarence Mackay, and Katherine Duer Mackay. She met Irving Berlin in 1924. Ellin's father opposed their relationship from the start. Irving wooed her with letters and songs over the airwaves such as "Remember" and "All Alone".

They eloped and were married in a simple civil ceremony at the Municipal Building, away from media attention. Because Irving was Jewish and Ellin was an Irish Catholic, their life was followed in every possible detail by the press, which found the romance between a self-made Jewish immigrant from the Lower East Side and a young heiress to be a sensational story.

For nearly three years Clarence Mackay refused to speak to the Berlins. They reconciled after the death of the Berlins' son, Irving Berlin Jr., on Christmas Day in 1928, less than one month after he was born. The Berlins were married for 63 years until her death in 1988. They had four children: Mary Ellin Barrett in 1926; Irving Berlin, Jr. in 1928; Linda Louise Emmet in 1932; and Elizabeth Irving Peters in 1936.

Ellin Berlin wrote a number of articles for The New Yorker before her marriage; her November 20, 1925, piece "Why We Go to Cabarets—A Post-Debutante Explains" was the magazine's first newsstand hit and helped save it. In 1933 she began writing short stories for the Saturday Evening Post and Ladies' Home Journal. In 1944 she published her first novel, Land I Have Chosen. This was followed by Lace Curtain (1958), Silver Platter (1957), and The Best of Families (1970).

She was a member of the United States Assay Commission.
