= Cheryl Machat Dorskind =

American photographer

- Born: 1955 (age 70–71); Roslyn Harbor, New York
- Occupations: Fine-art photographer, Author, Educator, newspaper columnist
- Spouse: Glenn Dorskind (m. 1982)
- Website: cherylmachatdorskind.com

Cheryl Machat Dorskind (born 1955) is an American fine-art photographer, writer, and educator who lives and works in Westhampton, New York.

== Background and education ==
Born in 1955, Machat Dorskind grew up in Roslyn Harbor, New York and graduated from Roslyn High School in 1973. She attended Washington University in St. Louis for the first year and a half of her college studies and graduated, cum laude, in June 1977 from Boston University with a Bachelor of Science degree in marketing. From 1978 to 1982, she was a Product Manager for Epic, Portrait, & The Associated Labels (then part of CBS, Inc. and now under the Sony Music umbrella) in New York City where she managed Pop music and R&B legends that included Dan Hartman, Karla DeVito, Patti LaBelle, The O'Jays, and Billy Ocean. While there she received two Recording Industry Association of America (RIAA) certified gold records in recognition of her important contribution to music marketing.

In 1982, Cheryl Machat married Glenn Dorskind, left Epic Records, and returned to her own artistic interests. Like many other photographers, she became involved in the photography of children when she had children of her own. Her daughter Nicole was born in 1986; her second daughter Joelle was born in 1991. Her experience with her own children resulted in a freelance career focusing primarily on children's portraits, and eventually in a book, The Art of Photographing Children, published in 2005.

Cheryl Machat Dorskind has been involved in a number of community service programs in the Greater Westhampton Beach Community. She has served as an Honorary Board Member for the Suffolk County Coalition Against Domestic Violence since 1989.

== Career ==
As a photo-artist, Dorskind is best known for her handpainted photographs or photo paintings, predominantly of landscapes and of children, in which she applies washes of oil paints and glazes of watercolors and pastels, a technique she has worked out experimentally over time. Since 1989 she has continued to exhibit her photography annually. Machat Dorskind was an associate professor at Southampton College (Long Island University) from 1994–2000 in the Fine Art department where she taught photography (Introductory and Intermediate Darkroom, Independent Study and BFA) to both majors and non-majors. She also taught at the Southampton Masters Workshop Series in July 1991, 1994, 1996, and 1999 and at the Maine Photographic Workshops in July 2001. Presently she is an assistant professor at Suffolk County Community College teaching digital photography. Online she teaches and mentors an international clientele at the Perfect Picture School of Photography since 2006.

In 2005, Machat Dorskind began writing the newspaper column, "Picture This," for The Southampton Press. Additionally, she has authored two photography books, The Art of Photographing Children, ©2005 (Watson-Guptill Publications), and The Art of Handpainting Photographs, ©1998 (Watson-Guptill Publications). Both books were received with critical acclaim and The Art of Handpainting Photographs is considered by Watson-Guptill Publications "the definitive guide to traditional methods of handpainting photographs." With the publication of The Art of Handpainting Photographs, Machat Dorskind coined the phrases "handpainted" and "photopainting," to draw attention to the fact that both aspects of the finished print are equally important: both the photograph and the color overlay are two integral parts of a unified whole. Prior to her book's 1998 publication, the process was known as colorization, or as tinted or hand-tinted.

== Selected reviews ==
- The Southampton Press, "Show Helps Boost West's Credentials", Eric Ernst, February 23, 2006
- Long Island Jewish World, Volume 34 #4, November 25-Dec 1, 2005
- Library Journal, (July 1, 1998)
- Booknews, Portland, OR
- Home & Garden Television, Carol's Product Pick, Episode #CDS-550
- The Easthampton Star, May 28, 1998 –S.S
- From Petersen's Photographic, (October 1998)
- News12
- Country Living Magazine, July 1992; "Country Buzzings"
- Newsday, Sunday July 19, 1992; Sunday, November 3, 1991
- New York Times; https://web.archive.org/web/20050118221950/http://www.southampton.liu.edu/academic/summer/1999/sumspecl.htm#photowork
- New York Times, Long Island Section, Sunday, July 1, 1990
- Paper Works Magazine, Berne, IN, Bi Monthly, Aug-Sep 2005
- Today's Books, Book Register, PNS Publishing 500 Abstract & Index, April 6, 2005
- Bostonia, Alumni Books, Spring 2005
- Photographer's Forum/Summer 2005, Noted, By James Kaufmann
- The Midwest Book Review, Reviewers Bookwatch: March 2005, James A. Cox, Editor in Chief, 278 Orchard Drive, Oregon, WI 53575; https://www.midwestbookreview.com/rbw/mar_05.htm
- Scrapbooking and Beyond, June 2005
- Digital Camera, Paramus, NJ, 6 times a year, July 2005
- Soho Journal Summer 2005, Vol7, No 1; https://web.archive.org/web/20110716102132/http://archive.sohojournal.com/?p=219
- https://web.archive.org/web/20090802072529/http://mybabyphotos.net/top-25-child-photography-books/

== Selected articles ==
- Tips on Taking Better Pictures, Picture This, The Southampton Press, June 2, 2005
- Use Color to Put POP in Photos, Picture This, The Southampton Press, August 11, 2005
- Good Photographs Rely on Mastering Exposure, "Picture This," The Southampton Press, August 3, 2006
- Through a Lens, Deftly, "Picture This," The Southampton Press, August 10, 2006
- Through the Lens, Into the World of Blue: A Photo Essay," Picture This," The Southampton Press, January 11, 2007
- Beyond Blue, Beyond Badge: A Photo Essay, "Picture This," The Southampton Press, January 18, 2007
- Team Effort Under Water, A Photo Essay, "Picture This," The Southampton Press, January 25, 2007
- Right Gear for the Road, "Picture This," The Southampton Press, August 9, 2007
- Fall Colors Ripe for Photography, "Picture This," November 1, 2007
- Using Black and White as a Plus, "Picture This," The Southampton Press, October 2, 2008
- The Best Techniques for Landscape Photos, "Picture This," The Southampton Press, October 16, 2008
