= American Association for the Promotion of Social Science =

The American Association for the Promotion of Social Science (est.1865) was founded in Boston, Massachusetts, by several high-profile academics. Officers in the first years of the society included William B. Rogers, Thomas Hill, George S. Boutwell, Francis Lieber, Erastus O. Haven, Mary Eliot Parkman, David A. Wells, Emory Washburn, Caroline Healey Dall, Samuel Eliot, F. B. Sanborn, Joseph White, George Walker, Theodore W. Dwight, and James J. Higginson.

In 1865, the group intended "to aid the development of social science, and to guide the public mind to the best practical means of promoting the amendment of laws, the advancement of education, the prevention and repression of crime, the reformation of criminals, and the progress of public morality, the adoption of sanitary regulations, and the diffusion of sound principles on questions of economy, trade, and finance. It will give attention to pauperism, and the topics related thereto; including the responsibility of the well-endowed and successful, the wise and educated, the honest and respectable, for the failures of others. It will aim to bring together the various societies and individuals now interested in these objects, for the purpose of obtaining by discussion the real elements of truth; by which doubts are removed, conflicting opinions harmonized, and a common ground afforded for treating wisely the great social problems of the day."

The society divided itself into departments of inquiry (education; health; jurisprudence; economy, trade and finance) and laid out research questions to guide collection of the most pertinent "data required." The questions proposed for research reflected key issues of the time in American society: national debt and a national currency; taxation and revenue; labor and capital; hasty and excessive legislation; crime and punishment; the province of law in regard to education, public health, and social morals; education of neglected and vicious children; relative value of classical and scientific instruction in schools and colleges; fine arts in education and industry; half-time system of instruction; quarantine considered in its relation to cholera; the tenement house; inspection of food and drugs; pork as an article of food; sewerage of great cities; and management of hospitals and insane asylums."

Meetings took place in Boston at the State House (Oct. 1865) and the Lowell Institute (Dec. 1865); and in New York at the YMCA on 5th Ave. (Nov. 1867). In 1866, the group joined with the "Boston Social Science Association" to form a joint committee called the "American Social Science Association" (ASSA); the committee met in Boston's city hall to discuss school reform and other matters. "The first annual meeting of the ASSA ... was ... held [in] 1868."

== See also ==
- American Social Science Association
