= Katherine Duer Mackay =

American suffragist and socialite

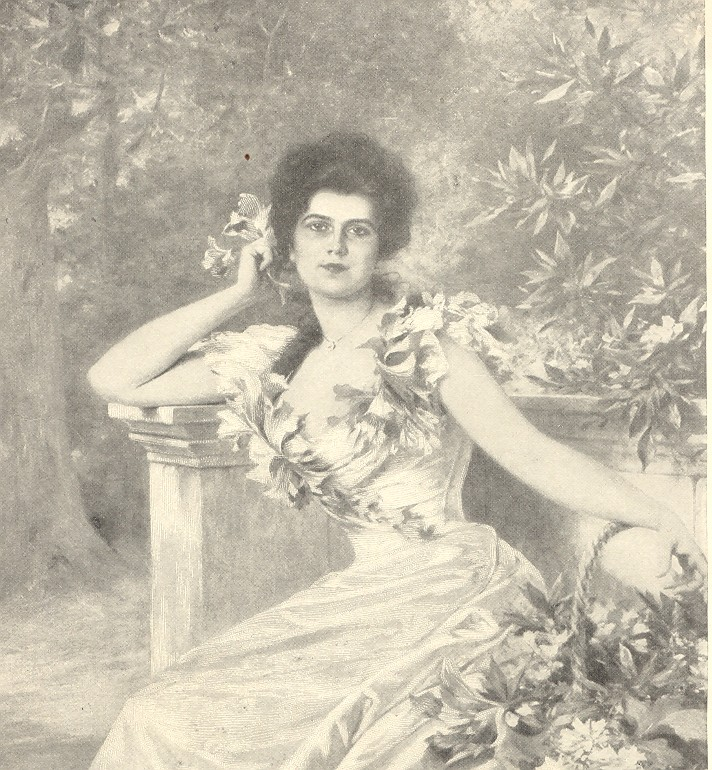
- Portrait by Théobald Chartran
- Born: Katherine Alexander Duer; 1878; New York, New York
- Died: 1930 (aged 51–52)
- Known for: Founder of the Equal Franchise Society; First woman to serve on the school board of the Roslyn Union Free School District
- Spouses: Clarence Mackay (m. 1898; div. 1914) Joseph Blake (m. 1914, divorced)
- Children: 3 (including Ellin Berlin)

Katherine Alexander Duer Mackay (1878 – 1930) was an American suffragist, socialite and writer from New York city. She was the founder of the Equal Franchise Society. Her involvement with the women's suffrage movement "encouraged other wealthy women to follow her lead and become involved." She was also the first female member of the Roslyn Union Free School District's school board in Roslyn, New York.

== Biography ==
Katherine Duer was born in New York City in 1878. She was a direct descendant of Lady Kitty Duer, daughter of Lord Stirling. She married Clarence H. Mackay in 1898. Mackay was well known in connection with Harbor Hill where she was involved with philanthropy and education. She lived in Roslyn from 1898 to 1910. In 1899, Mackay refurbished Roslyn's public library, the William Cullen Bryant Library. She installed new carpet, replaced books and hired two librarians. Mackay would invite people, and children, to the house for various functions. Once, the Trinity Episcopal Sunday School members were invited to Harbor Hill for a picnic where the children inducted her as an "honorary knight". Mackay served on the Roslyn School board from 1905 to 1910, and was the first woman on the board. During her term on the board, she was able to successfully remove corporal punishment from the public schools in Roslyn. She also enrolled her own children in the public schools in Roslyn because she felt that "it is necessary for the rich as well as the poor to patronize them."

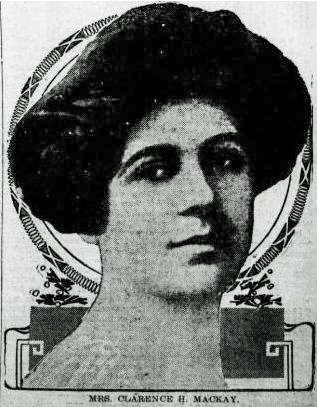
Katherine Duer Mackay (ca. 1910)

Mackay became a suffragist after reading books used for a suffrage debate at the Colony Club. She was also related to another suffragist, Alice Duer Miller. Mackay argued for suffrage from the standpoint of maternalism: she said that giving mothers the vote would let them protect their families, and mothers would make politics more moral, because they would vote selflessly for their children. Mackay, unlike many other wealthy suffragists, did not emphasize suffrage as a means of giving women political independence or equality. Her maternalist arguments had more in common with the earlier views of Josephine Lowell.

Mackay became the president of the Equal Franchise Society (EFS), which she founded, in 1908. She leased offices for the group's meetings in the Madison Square Building. Mackay's involvement in the suffrage movement helped combat the stereotype of suffragists as "frumpy" or "unwomanly". She also drew other wealthy women into the suffrage movement, working with Harriot Stanton Blatch to recruit the society women of New York. She recruited new EFS members from her home, convincing Florence Harriman, Anne Harriman Vanderbilt, and Alva Belmont. In March 1909, the EFS resolved to work towards suffrage for women in New York, hoping they could pave the way for suffrage across the country by 1914. Mackay encouraged people to become educated about suffrage and organized a series of lectures at the Garden Theater. She did not want to participate in Blatch's 1910 suffrage parade but allowed the EFS to help fund it. Mackay did volunteer for other events by fundraising, speaking, writing letters to newspapers, and answering the EFS's mail. By 1911, she found that being the president of EFS was too time consuming for her, but she retained her membership in the group. Speculation that Mackay left EFS for reasons other than demands on her time included her apparent "dissatisfaction over the management of the campaign to get suffrage bills passed by the Legislature."

Dr. Joseph A. Blake became the personal physician for Clarence Mackay and operated on him twice. Gossip about a possible illicit relationship between the physician of Clarence Mackay, Dr. Blake, and Katherine Mackay had started in the summer of 1911. Prior to that, Blake and his wife had already lived apart for several years. Hints that Katherine and Clarence Mackay were separating came in July 1913. Mackay was sued by Catherine Ketcham Blake for the alienation of affections of her husband in 1913 for the sum of $1,000,000. Answering the claims of Catherine Blake, Mackay said that Joseph Blake had stopped loving his wife many years ago because of her temper and "death threats". Catherine Blake dropped the suit later that year. Mackay and her husband, Clarence, were divorced in February 1914. She also gave up her American citizenship. Full custody of their three children, Katherine Duer, Ellin Duer and John William, was given to Clarence Mackay. On November 28, 1914, she married Blake in Paris.

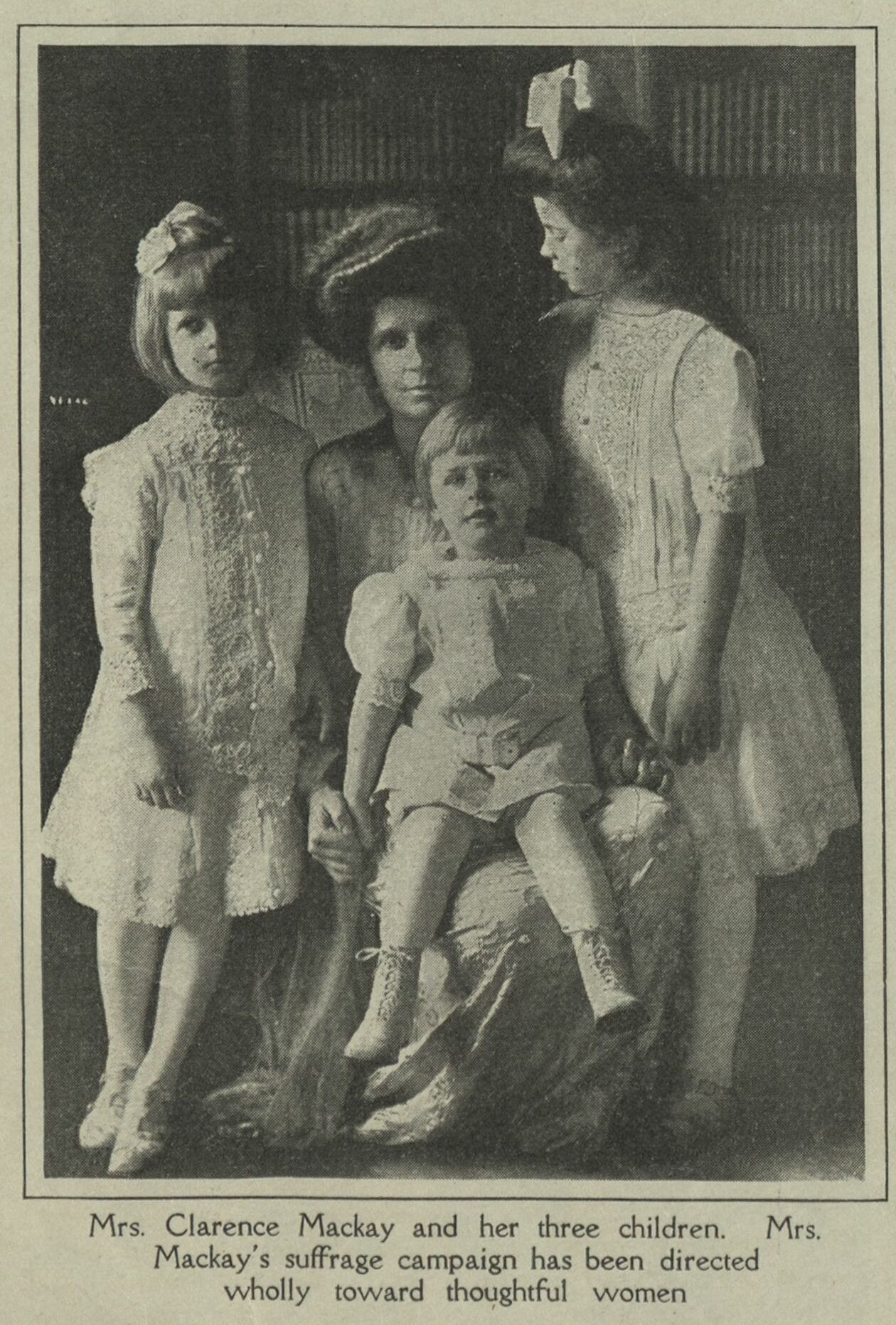
Mrs. Clarence Mackay and her three children.

In Paris, Mackay continued to fight for women's suffrage, contributing to the Woman Suffrage Party from overseas. The couple was involved in aiding the war effort during World War I. In 1919, they decided to come back to New York. Later, her marriage to Blake would also end in divorce. Mackay attempted to reconcile with her former husband, Clarence in 1930, but she died that same year.

== Works ==
Mackay wrote a novel, The Stone of Destiny, published in 1904, and a drama, Gabrielle. A Dream from the Treasures Contained in the Letters of Abélard and Héloïse, published in The North American Review in 1903.
