= Clarence Mackay =

American financier and philanthropist (1874–1938)

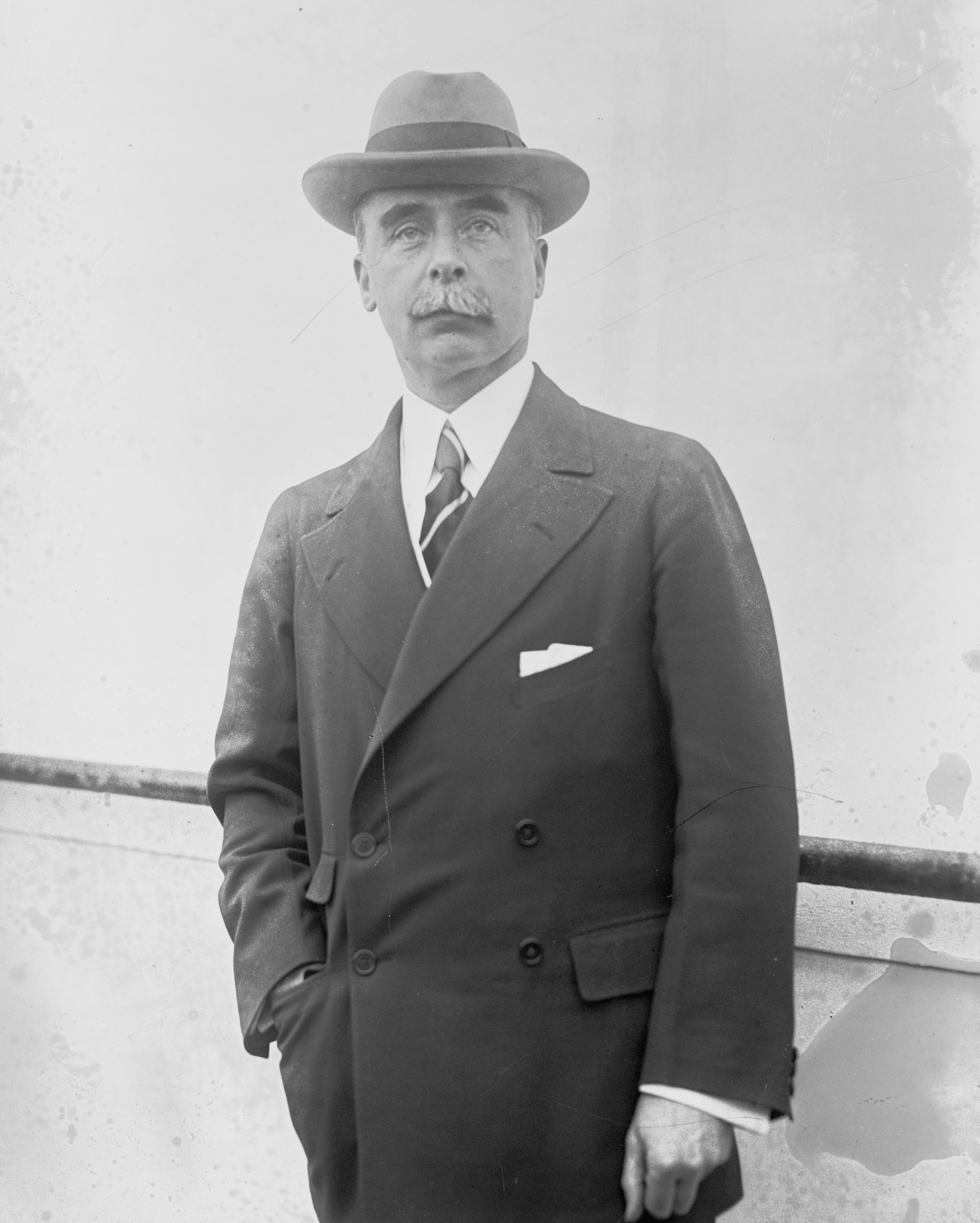
- Mackay, c. 1915
- Born: April 17, 1874; San Francisco, California, U.S.
- Died: November 12, 1938 (aged 64); Manhattan, New York City, U.S.
- Political party: Republican
- Spouses: Katherine Alexander Duer (m. 1898; div. 1914) Anna Case (m. 1931)
- Children: 3, including Ellin Berlin
- Parent(s): John William Mackay; Louise Antoinette Hungerford Bryant
- Relatives: Mary Barrett (granddaughter); Irving Berlin (son-in-law)

Clarence Hungerford Mackay (/ˈmæki/; April 17, 1874 – November 12, 1938) was an American financier. He was chairman of the board of the Postal Telegraph and Cable Corporation and president of the Mackay Radio and Telegraph Company.

== Early life ==
He was born on April 17, 1874, in San Francisco, California, to Louise Antoinette (née Hungerford) Bryant Mackay (1843–1928) and John William Mackay. His father was a silver miner and telegraph mogul who had been born in Dublin and emigrated to America with his parents. Soon after arriving in America, John's father died, and John sold newspapers and got a shipyard job to support his mother and sister. Eventually, he went west, and with three partners, (Note: The four partners were John William Mackay, James Graham Fair, James C. Flood and William S. O'Brien, who were collectively known as the Bonanza Kings.) formed a mining corporation and discovered the "Big Bonanza" in Virginia City, Nevada, which became the largest single deposit of gold and silver ever found. More than $100 million worth of gold ($3.9 billion in today's currency) was extracted from that mine before it was exhausted in 1898, making all of them very wealthy. His father had married his mother and adopted her daughter by an earlier marriage. They lived between Paris and New York, where they brought up his daughter and their two sons, John and Clarence.

== Career ==
Clarence sold his major source of income, the Postal Telegraph Company, to the new International Telephone and Telegraph Company (ITT) for an enormous amount of stock. The 1929 stock market crash wiped him out. He survived the Great Depression by selling his art and antiques. He was eventually reconciled with his daughter Ellin and her husband Irving Berlin when he went to comfort her on the cot death of her baby. Irving Berlin always treated his father-in-law with respect and affection. Both Ellin Berlin and Clarence's granddaughter, Mary Ellin Barrett, were successful writers.

== Personal life ==
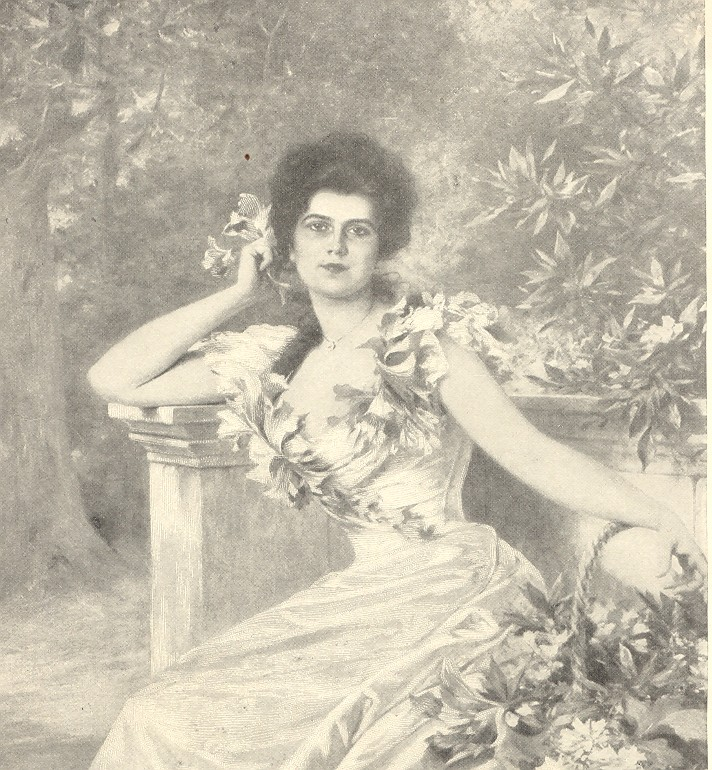
Mackay's first wife, Katherine Duer

Around 1897, Mackay met Katherine Alexander Duer (1880–1930), a debutante from an old, high society, New York family that he met on a steamship crossing between New York and England. She was a descendant of Lady Kitty Duer, daughter of Lord Stirling. They fell in love and were married on May 17, 1898. Harbor Hill in Roslyn, Long Island, the site of their future estate with the striking view of Hempstead Harbor, was Katherine's and Clarence's wedding present from the senior Mackays. Katherine oversaw much of the design and building of their mansion at Harbor Hill which was designed by Stanford White of McKim, Mead, and White and was the largest home White ever designed. Katherine was a suffragette and a champion of women's rights and became the first woman member of the Roslyn school board in 1905. Together, Clarence and Katherine were the parents of three children:

- Katherine Mackay (1900–1971), who married Kenneth O'Brien (1895–1954) in 1922. They divorced and she remarried to Robert Ziemer Hawkins (1903–1979) in 1938.
- Ellin Mackay (1903–1988), who fell in love with the popular composer Irving Berlin, to the fury of her father. Berlin was a Russian immigrant, an Orthodox Jewish widower fifteen years older than she. When Ellin insisted on marrying Berlin in 1926, Clarence disinherited her. However, Berlin was already wealthy at this stage, the most popular songwriter of his time.
- John William Mackay (1907–1988), who married Josephine Gwendolyn Rose (1908–2004) in 1929.

In 1910, Katherine left Clarence and her three children to run away with Dr. Joseph Blake. Blake in turn ran away with her nurse. The marriage officially ended in divorce in Paris in 1914. Katherine returned to New York in 1930, the same year she died from cancer.

Because of religious convictions (he was a traditional Irish-American Catholic), Mackay would not remarry as long as his first wife, Katherine, lived. Therefore, Clarence and Anna Case (1888–1984) waited until after Katherine's death in 1930, and were subsequently married in on July 18, 1931, at St. Mary's Roman Catholic Church in Roslyn, New York. His wedding gift to Case was a platinum-set emerald and diamond necklace. The 167.97 carats (33.594 g) emerald was mined in Colombia and the necklace designed by Cartier. Case was a lyric soprano who sang with the Metropolitan Opera and as a concert soloist. "Her life changed dramatically following an engagement to sing at a private musicale given in the home of Clarence H. Mackay (c. 1916). Taken with her beauty, he sent a carload of flowers to her at her next Carnegie Hall recital, enclosing a small diamond band with an enamel bluebird in the center."

He died of cancer on November 12, 1938. His funeral was at St. Patrick's Cathedral where the New York Philharmonic played. He was buried at Green-Wood Cemetery.

=== Legacy ===
Anna Case Mackay donated her diamond necklace to the Smithsonian Institution in 1984.

Clarence Mackay was a noted collector of medieval suits of armor, some of which he sold to the Metropolitan Museum of Art in the early 1930s. An aviation trophy, administered by the United States National Aeronautic Association and awarded yearly by the United States Air Force for the "most meritorious flight of the year" by an Air Force person, persons, or organization, is named in Mackay's honor.

The Mackay Mountains are a prominent group of peaks 10 nautical miles (19 km) south of the Allegheny Mountains in the Ford Ranges of Marie Byrd Land, Antarctica. They were discovered by the Byrd Antarctic Expedition in 1934, and named for Clarence Mackay, a benefactor of the expedition.
