= Hook Creek =

Creek in Queens and Nassau County, New York

Location
- Country: United States
- Region: South Shore of Long Island, New York

Physical characteristics
- Mouth: Jamaica Bay
  - coordinates: 40°38′10″N 73°44′40″W

Hook Creek is a stream on the South Shore of Long Island, in New York, United States. The creek travels through both the New York City borough of Queens and the Town of Hempstead in Nassau County.

== Description ==
Hook Creek runs between Rosedale, Queens and Jamaica Bay. The creek begins in Rosedale, flowing in a drainage tunnel towards the south, west, and southwest roughly following along Hook Creek Boulevard, eventually reaching Sunrise Highway/Conduit Boulevard (NY 27) and the Atlantic & Montauk Branches of the Long Island Rail Road. It then meanders its way south to Woodmere, forming part of the border between New York City and Nassau County – in addition to forming parts of the Village of Valley Stream's western border.

Hook Creek eventually emerges from the tunnel near the Green Acres Mall. It then continues southwards, soon reaching its confluence with Valley Stream Brook, just south of Rosedale Road. From there, Hook Creek continues southwards through Hook Creek Park and hugging the edge of North Woodmere Park, thence passing under Rockaway Turnpike and meandering its way around Meadowmere and Meadowmere Park (where it passes underneath the Hook Creek Bridge) near John F. Kennedy International Airport before eventually reaching its mouth at Jamaica Bay.

Portions of the long-proposed path of the Nassau Expressway follow Hook Creek.

== History ==
During the 20th century, a considerable amount of Hook Creek's wetlands were lost to development (including the construction of the adjacent John F. Kennedy International Airport), contributing to increased flooding in the surrounding areas during major storms. The Queens side of the creek was also not connected to New York City's sanitary sewer network until the early 21st century, leading to wastewater being released into the creek and causing environmental degradation. Industrial pollution also negatively impacted the water quality and marine life within the water.

In the 21st century, New York City restored large sections of wetland, completing a $700,000 restoration project in Hook Creek Park in May 2023. The sections of Queens near the creek were ultimately hooked up to New York City's sanitary sewer system in 2010, allowing the wastewater to be treated instead of being dumped into the creek, and thus enabling the environmental quality of the creek and Jamaica Bay to be improved & restored.

The creek is the namesake of Hook Creek Boulevard.

== See also ==
- Geography of Long Island
- Motts Creek (Nassau County, New York)
