= Valley Stream Brook =

Location
- Country: United States
- Region: South Shore of Long Island, New York

Physical characteristics
- Mouth: Hook Creek
  - coordinates: 40°38′53″N 73°44′23″W

Valley Stream Brook (more commonly known as Valley Stream) is a stream on the South Shore of Long Island, in New York, United States.

== Description ==
Valley Stream Brook runs between Franklin Square and Hook Creek, ultimately emptying into Jamaica Bay. The creek begins in Franklin Square, flowing towards the south, west, and southwest to Hook Creek in Woodmere.

Valley Stream eventually reaches its southern terminus at its confluence with Hook Creek, just south of Rosedale Road. From there, the water from Valley Stream continues down Hook Creek, eventually reaching Jamaica Bay.

Communities which Valley Stream Brook passes through include Franklin Square, North Valley Stream, Valley Stream, South Valley Stream, and Woodmere in the Town of Hempstead in Nassau County – in addition to touching the Rosedale section of the New York City borough of Queens at its confluence with Hook Creek.

== History ==
In the 1850s, Valley Stream's water was used in providing the City of Brooklyn with its public drinking water.

In the late 1980s, portions of Valley Stream and its tributaries (such as Clear Stream and Mill Brook) began to dry up, leading to restoration efforts being undertaken. This included the construction of a new dam.

The stream is the namesake of North Valley Stream, South Valley Stream, and the Village of Valley Stream.

== See also ==
- Geography of Long Island
- Motts Creek (Nassau County, New York)
