= Roslyn Estates, New York =

- Village
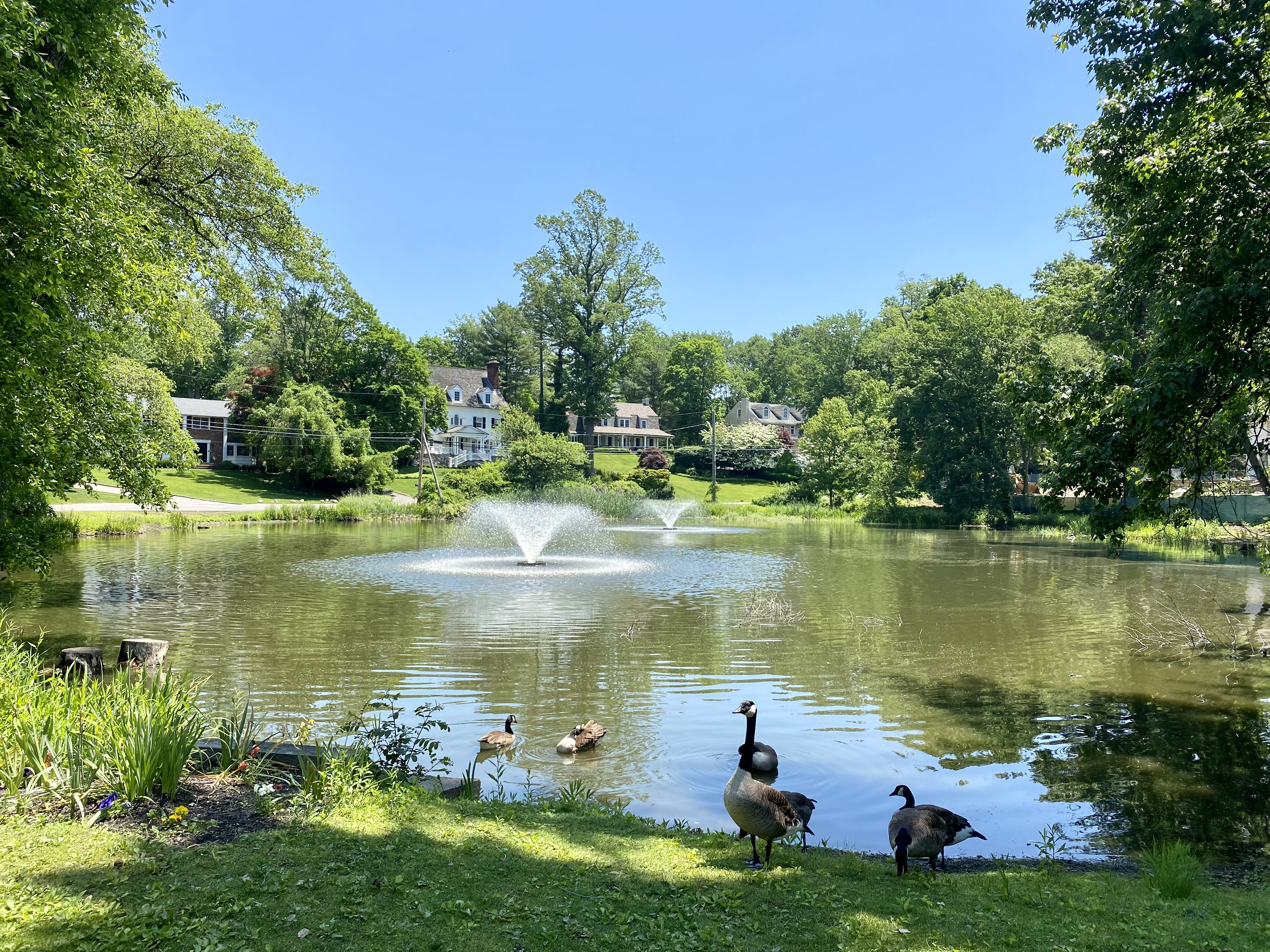
- Black Ink Pond in Roslyn Estates in 2021

- Official emblem of Roslyn Estates
- Nicknames: "The Estates"; "The Eden of Long Island"
- Location in Nassau County and the state of New York

- Location on Long Island Location within the state of New York
- Coordinates: 40°47′38″N 73°39′42″W
- Country: United States
- State: New York
- County: Nassau
- Town: North Hempstead
- Incorporated: June 8, 1931
- Named for: The original development firm's name and its location adjacent to Roslyn

Government
  - Mayor: Adam Koblenz
  - Trustees: List of Trustees: • Brett Auerbach; • Brian Feingold; • Stephen Fox; • Susan Rubenstein

Area
  - Total: 0.44 sq mi (1.13 km^{2})
  - Land: 0.44 sq mi (1.13 km^{2})
  - Water: 0 sq mi (0.00 km^{2})
- Elevation: 230 ft (70 m)

Population (2020)
  - Total: 1,318
  - Density: 3,018.1/sq mi (1,165.28/km^{2})
- Demonym(s): Roslyn Estatesian; Roslynian; Roslynite
- Time zone: UTC-5 (Eastern (EST))
  - Summer (DST): UTC-4 (EDT)
- ZIP codes: 11576 (Roslyn); 11577 (Roslyn Heights)
- Area codes: 516, 363
- FIPS code: 36-63792
- GNIS feature ID: 0962931
- Website: www.villageofroslynestates.gov

Roslyn Estates is a village in the Town of North Hempstead in Nassau County, on the North Shore of Long Island, in New York, United States. It is considered part of the Greater Roslyn area, which is anchored by the Incorporated Village of Roslyn. The population was 1,318 at the time of the 2020 census.

== History ==
=== Before the village (pre-colonization – 1931) ===
The area where Roslyn Estates is located was originally inhabited by the Matinecock Native Americans. European colonists started to settle in the area in the 17th century – specifically settlers of Dutch and English heritage. From that point until the early 20th century, much of what is now the Village of Roslyn Estates consisted of farmland and estates.

Around 1908, the land was purchased by developer Dean Alvord, who also developed Prospect Park South in Brooklyn, Belle Terre in Port Jefferson. On this land, Alvord would create the planned, residential community that today forms the Village of Roslyn Estates, under the name "Roslyn Estates, Incorporated". It was nicknamed "The Eden of Long Island" when originally developed, due to the community's design and setting.

In 1911, the community's civic association, known as the Association of Roslyn Estates, was formed. As of 2026, it is the oldest active civic association in Nassau County.

=== Village of Roslyn Estates (1931 – present) ===
In 1931, residents decided to try incorporating Roslyn Estates as a village, due to the fact that the community's original deed restrictions were set to expire around that time. Their efforts to incorporate were successful, and the Village of Roslyn Estates was incorporated on June 8, 1931. A total of 49 Roslyn Estates residents participated in the incorporation vote on May 25 of that year – all of whom voted in favor of incorporating their community as a village.

In the mid-1950s, a 27-acre (11 ha) housing development, known as Homes in Roslyn Estates, was constructed in the village, and sponsored by builders Edward Fineberg and Arthur Bandes and consisting of 60 ranch and split-level homes designed by architect Stanley J. Shaftel.

In 1972, Roslyn Estates Village Hall was built. It was designed by John A. Grammas on land given to the village by the firm of Saul Sokolov, Inc., which had developed that section of Roslyn Estates several years prior.

In 1974, Mayor Robert D. Zucker attempted to have the boundaries of the Manhasset Park District redrawn to include the village after the district added an additional 260 parking spaces to the commuter parking fields at the Manhasset Long Island Rail Road station. Zucker stated that many Roslyn Estates residents preferred the Manhasset station over the closer Roslyn station due to the fact that service to/from Pennsylvania Station on the Port Washington Branch is direct, whereas a change at Jamaica is required on the Oyster Bay Branch. By having the district boundaries redrawn to include the village, Roslyn Estates residents would have the ability to be guaranteed a parking space at the Manhasset station for commuting to/from Manhattan. Officials from both the Town of North Hempstead and the Manhasset Park District – as well as Manhasset residents – lamented the idea, given that Roslyn Estates is not part of the Greater Manhasset area, and felt that the needs of Greater Manhasset should be paramount for the Manhasset Park District. The proposal was ultimately denied.

Roslyn Estates celebrated its 50th anniversary in 1981.

=== Etymology ===
The name of Roslyn Estates was taken directly from the name which was used by the community's original development group, Roslyn Estates, Incorporated. The "Roslyn" part of its name is shared with Roslyn, Roslyn Harbor, and Roslyn Heights; it can ultimately be traced back to when the name "Roslyn" was chosen for that village, due to the area's geography reminding officials of the geography of Roslin, Scotland.

== Geography ==
According to the United States Census Bureau, the village has a total area of 0.4 square miles (1.0 km^{2}), all land.

=== Topography ===
Like the rest of Long Island's North Shore, Roslyn Estates is situated on a terminal moraine known as the Harbor Hill Moraine. This moraine was formed by glaciers during the Wisconsin Glacial Episode, The moraine is named for Harbor Hill – the highest geographic point in Nassau County, which is located in nearby Roslyn and East Hills.

According to the United States Environmental Protection Agency and the United States Geological Survey, the highest point in Roslyn Estates is located between The Pines and The Hemlocks, at 287 feet (87 m), and the lowest point is located near The Locusts, at approximately 170 feet (52 m).

=== Drainage ===
An interactive map showing the watersheds in the Village of Roslyn Estates and their approximate boundaries.

Roslyn Estates is split among four minor drainage areas: Inner Hempstead Harbor (part of the Hempstead Harbor Watershed), Hempstead Lake, Mill River (both part of the Mill River Watershed), and Leeds Pond (part of the Manhasset Bay Watershed), and is located within the larger Long Island Sound/Atlantic Ocean Watershed.

=== Climate ===
The Village of Roslyn Estates features a humid subtropical climate (Cfa) under the Köppen climate classification. As such, the village experiences hot, humid summers and cold winters, and experiences precipitation throughout the entirety of the year.

Climate data for Roslyn Estates, New York, 1991–2020 normals, extremes 1999–present
| Month | Jan | Feb | Mar | Apr | May | Jun | Jul | Aug | Sep | Oct | Nov | Dec | Year |
|---|---|---|---|---|---|---|---|---|---|---|---|---|---|
| Record high °F (°C) | 71 (22) | 73 (23) | 87 (31) | 94 (34) | 97 (36) | 101 (38) | 108 (42) | 105 (41) | 97 (36) | 89 (32) | 83 (28) | 76 (24) | 108 (42) |
| Mean daily maximum °F (°C) | 40.4 (4.7) | 42.9 (6.1) | 51.1 (10.6) | 61.2 (16.2) | 70.6 (21.4) | 79.6 (26.4) | 84.5 (29.2) | 83.3 (28.5) | 76.0 (24.4) | 65.4 (18.6) | 55.7 (13.2) | 45.1 (7.3) | 63.0 (17.2) |
| Daily mean °F (°C) | 33.4 (0.8) | 35.0 (1.7) | 42.0 (5.6) | 51.8 (11.0) | 60.8 (16.0) | 70.1 (21.2) | 75.2 (24.0) | 74.1 (23.4) | 67.2 (19.6) | 56.5 (13.6) | 47.8 (8.8) | 38.2 (3.4) | 54.3 (12.4) |
| Mean daily minimum °F (°C) | 26.4 (−3.1) | 27.1 (−2.7) | 33.5 (0.8) | 42.4 (5.8) | 51.0 (10.6) | 60.6 (15.9) | 65.8 (18.8) | 65.0 (18.3) | 58.3 (14.6) | 47.6 (8.7) | 39.9 (4.4) | 31.2 (−0.4) | 45.7 (7.6) |
| Record low °F (°C) | −4 (−20) | −5 (−21) | 5 (−15) | 13 (−11) | 34 (1) | 43 (6) | 50 (10) | 46 (8) | 36 (2) | 27 (−3) | 17 (−8) | −2 (−19) | −5 (−21) |
| Average precipitation inches (mm) | 3.56 (90) | 2.87 (73) | 4.47 (114) | 3.85 (98) | 3.23 (82) | 3.54 (90) | 3.97 (101) | 4.26 (108) | 4.31 (109) | 4.08 (104) | 3.18 (81) | 3.99 (101) | 45.31 (1,151) |
| Average snowfall inches (cm) | 5.5 (14) | 7.8 (20) | 3.7 (9.4) | 0.3 (0.76) | 0 (0) | 0 (0) | 0 (0) | 0 (0) | 0 (0) | 0 (0) | 0.2 (0.51) | 5.7 (14) | 23.2 (58.67) |
| Average precipitation days | 8 | 9.1 | 11.4 | 14.3 | 16.5 | 17.4 | 18 | 16.8 | 13.4 | 13.1 | 8.8 | 11.7 | 158.5 |
| Average snowy days | 4.6 | 4.7 | 2.9 | 0.3 | 0 | 0 | 0 | 0 | 0 | 0.1 | 0.5 | 2.7 | 15.8 |
| Average relative humidity (%) | 73 | 75 | 72 | 72 | 75 | 74 | 73 | 71 | 73 | 73 | 71 | 75 | 73 |
| Mean monthly sunshine hours | 177 | 153 | 172 | 167 | 202 | 213 | 237 | 241 | 215 | 190 | 210 | 171 | 2,348 |
| Mean daily daylight hours | 9.6 | 10.7 | 12.0 | 13.3 | 14.5 | 15.1 | 14.8 | 13.8 | 12.5 | 11.1 | 9.9 | 9.3 | 12.2 |
| Average ultraviolet index | 2 | 2 | 2 | 3 | 5 | 6 | 6 | 6 | 5 | 3 | 2 | 2 | 4 |
Source: NOAA; Weather Atlas

== Demographics ==
Historical population
| Census | Pop. | Note | %± |
|---|---|---|---|
| 1940 | 464 | | — |
| 1950 | 612 | | 31.9% |
| 1960 | 1,289 | | 110.6% |
| 1970 | 1,420 | | 10.2% |
| 1980 | 1,292 | | −9.0% |
| 1990 | 1,184 | | −8.4% |
| 2000 | 1,210 | | 2.2% |
| 2010 | 1,251 | | 3.4% |
| 2020 | 1,318 | | 5.4% |
U.S. Decennial Census

=== 2020 census ===
As of the census of 2020, there were 1,318 people residing in the village. The racial makeup of the village was 80.57% White, 0.91% African American, 0.01% Native American, 12.82% Asian, 0.98% from other races, and 4.09% from two or more races. Hispanic or Latino of any race were 3.18% of the population.

=== 2010 census ===
As of the census of 2010, there were 1,251 people residing in the village. The racial makeup of the village was 90.25% White, 0.40% African American, 8.23% Asian, 0.24% from other races, and 0.88% from two or more races. Hispanic or Latino of any race were 1.36% of the population.

=== Census 2000 ===
As of the census of 2000, there were 1,210 people, 401 households, and 354 families residing in the village. The population density was 2,727.7 inhabitants per square mile (1,053.2/km^{2}). There were 410 housing units at an average density of 924.3 per square mile (356.9/km^{2}). The racial makeup of the village was 93.22% White, 0.17% African American, 4.88% Asian, 1.24% from other races, and 0.50% from two or more races. Hispanic or Latino of any race were 2.23% of the population.

There were 401 households, out of which 46.9% had children under the age of 18 living with them, 81.3% were married couples living together, 6.0% had a female householder with no husband present, and 11.7% were non-families. 9.7% of all households were made up of individuals, and 6.7% had someone living alone who was 65 years of age or older. The average household size was 3.02 and the average family size was 3.22.

In the village, the population was spread out, with 31.6% under the age of 18, 3.4% from 18 to 24, 23.0% from 25 to 44, 27.6% from 45 to 64, and 14.5% who were 65 years of age or older. The median age was 41 years. For every 100 females, there were 97.4 males. For every 100 females age 18 and over, there were 87.8 males.

The median income for a household in the village was $154,849, and the median income for a family was $157,402. Males had a median income of $100,000 versus $65,893 for females. The per capita income for the village was $73,628. About 2.0% of families and 2.5% of the population were below the poverty line, including 2.6% of those under age 18 and none of those age 65 or over.

== Economy ==
Roslyn Estates is a bedroom community of the City of New York, which is how the community was originally developed to be by Dean Alvord. As such, a significant number of Roslyn Estates residents commute to/from New York for work.

The village itself is predominantly residential in character, with the heavy majority of lots within the village being zoned for single-family homes. The village has a business district along the south side of Northern Boulevard, which is where the heavy majority of businesses within the village are located. The exceptions are the former Roslyn Estates Sales Office and former Highland Elementary School towards the southeastern edge of the village; these buildings are now a Kosher restaurant and house of worship, respectively.

== Parks and recreation ==
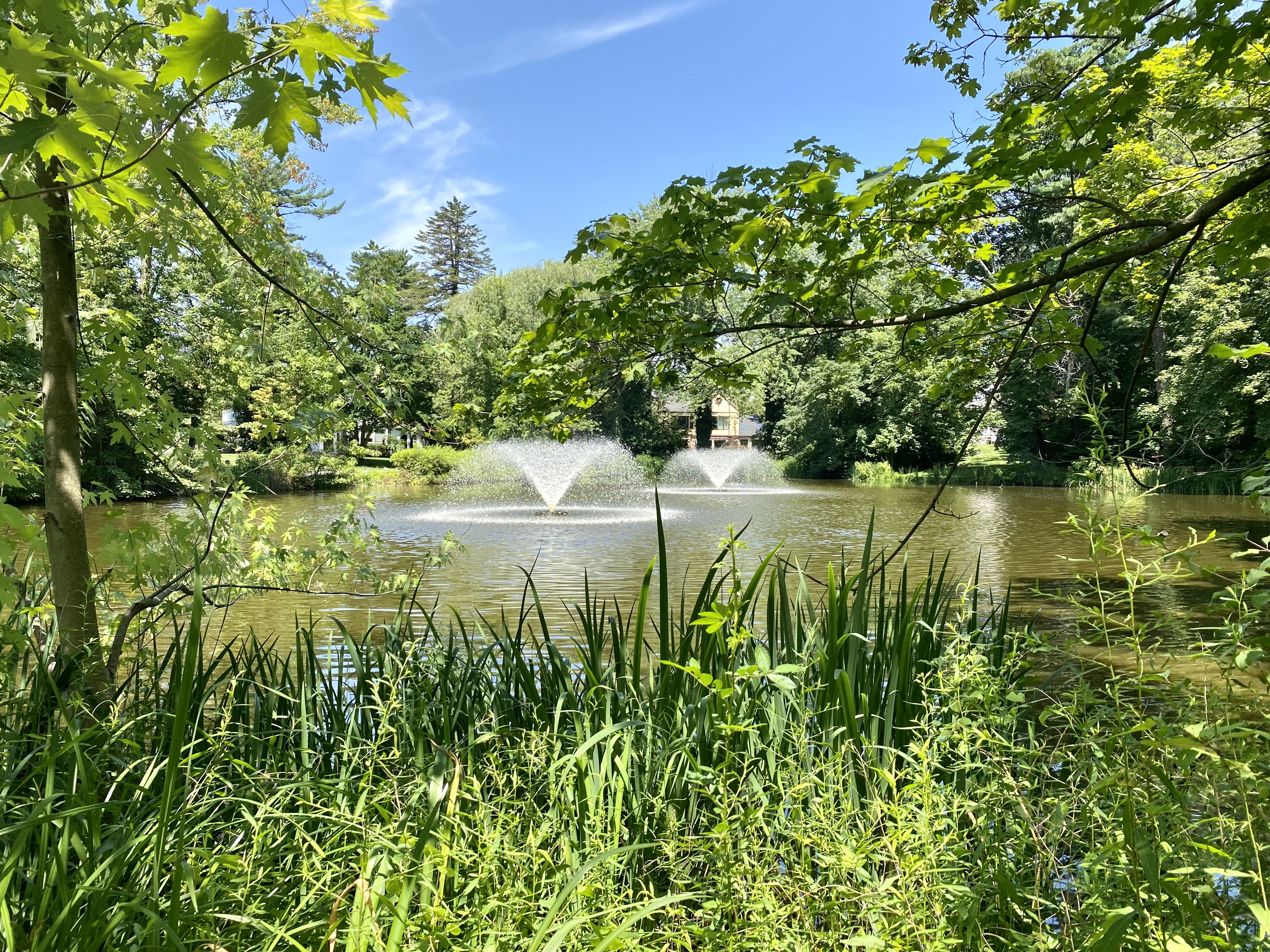
The Loch Pond in 2021

Roslyn Estates features a number of small parks and green spaces. Those parks and green spaces include:

- Azalea Park
- Black Ink Pond (formerly known as Lotus Pond)
- The Fenway Preserve
- The Loch Pond (also known as Little Turf Pond)

Roslyn Estates also has a number of other green spaces as well as walking paths and landscaped traffic islands with gardens.

Additionally, a private tennis club – known as the Tennis King – is located adjacent to Village Hall at the southern edge of the village, and Christopher Morley Park forms part of the border between Roslyn Estates and North Hills.

== Government ==
=== Village government ===
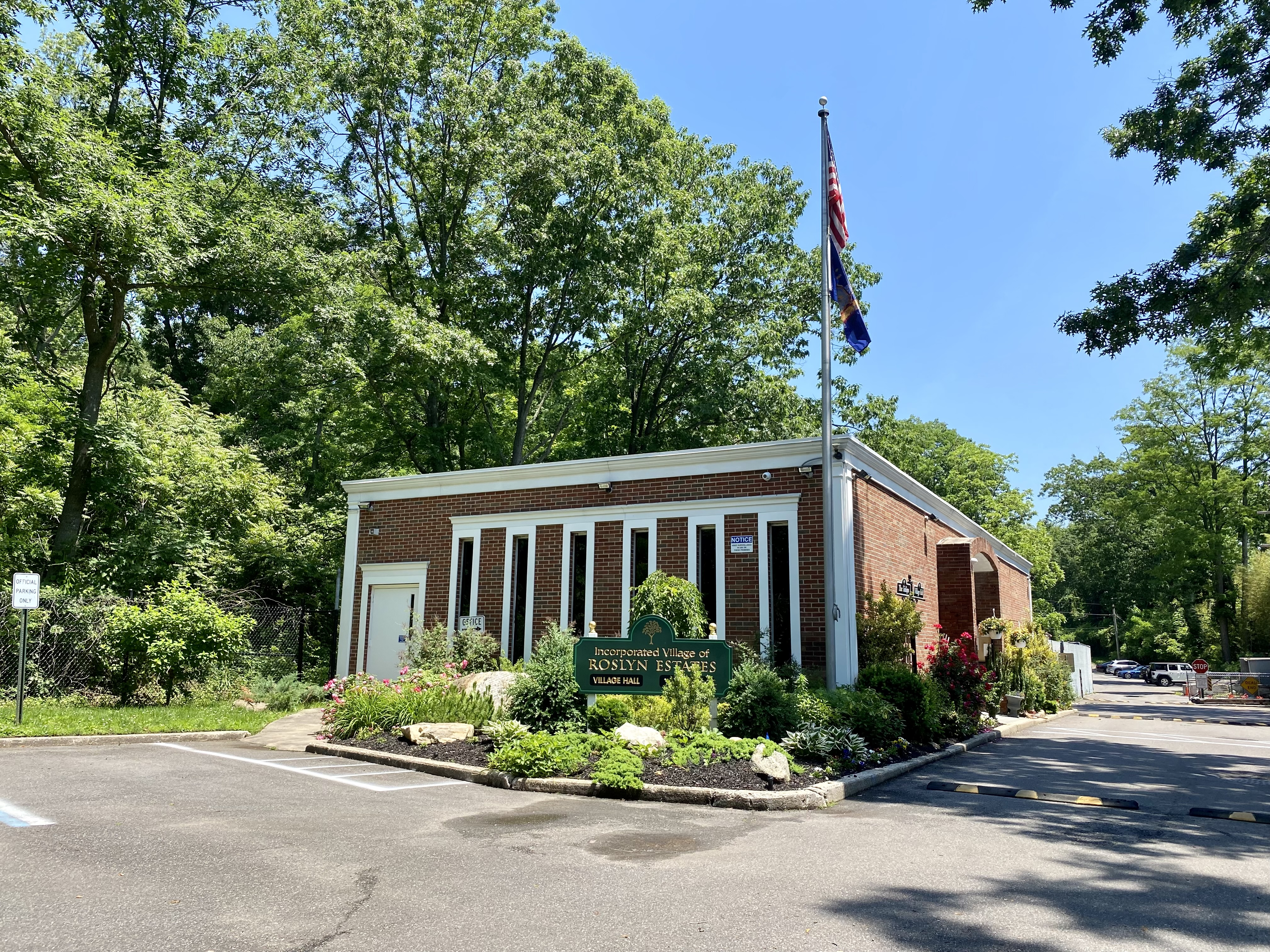
Roslyn Estates Village Hall in 2021

As of May 2025, the Mayor of Roslyn Estates is Adam Koblenz, and the Trustees are Brett Auerbach, Brian Feingold, Stephen Fox, and Susan Rubinstein. All elected officials on the Board of Trustees serve 2-year terms and are unpaid.

The following is a list of Roslyn Estates' mayors, from 1931 to present:

Mayors of Roslyn Estates:
| Mayor's name | Year(s) in office |
|---|---|
| Paul Speer | 1931–1933 |
| Louis O. Rohland | 1933–1949 |
| Harter F. Wright | 1949–1951 |
| Samuel E. Swiggert | 1951–1955 |
| Frank J. Silvestri | 1955–1961 |
| Junius P. Wilson, Jr. | 1961–1963 |
| Hamilton O. Hale | 1963–1965 |
| Frank J. Silvestri | 1965–1969 |
| Robert D. Zucker | 1969–1979 |
| Elliot Baritz | 1979–1987 |
| Michael Zucker | 1987–1993 |
| Susan Rand | 1993–1995 |
| Alexander Kaplan | 1995–1999 |
| Susan Ben-Moshe | 1999–2011 |
| Jeffrey Schwartzberg | 2011–2017 |
| Paul Leone Peters | 2017–2025 |
| Adam Koblenz | 2025–Present |

=== Representation in higher government ===
==== Town representation ====
Roslyn Estates is located entirely within the Town of North Hempstead's 6th council district, which as of May 2025 is represented on the North Hempstead Town Council by Mariann Dalimonte (D–Port Washington).

==== County representation ====
Roslyn Estates is located in Nassau County's 10th Legislative district, which as of May 2025 is represented in the Nassau County Legislature by Mazi Melesa Pilip (R–Great Neck).

==== New York State representation ====
===== New York State Assembly =====
Roslyn Estates is located in the New York State Assembly's 16th State Assembly district, which as of May 2025 is represented by Daniel J. Norber (R–Great Neck).

===== New York State Senate =====
Roslyn Estates is located in the New York State Senate's 7th State Senate district, which as of May 2025 is represented by Jack M. Martins (R–Old Westbury).

==== Federal representation ====
===== United States Congress =====
Roslyn Estates is located in New York's 3rd congressional district, which as of May 2025 is represented in the United States Congress by Thomas R. Suozzi (D–Glen Cove).

===== United States Senate =====
Like the rest of New York, Roslyn Estates is represented in the United States Senate by Charles E. Schumer (D) and Kirsten E. Gillibrand (D).

=== Politics ===
In the 2024 U.S. presidential election, the majority of Roslyn Estates voters voted for Kamala D. Harris (D). Harris carried the village with 52.3% of the vote (404 votes), while Donald J. Trump (R) received 45.2% (349 votes). Third-party and write-in candidates received the remaining 2.5% of the vote (19 votes).

== Education ==
=== School district ===
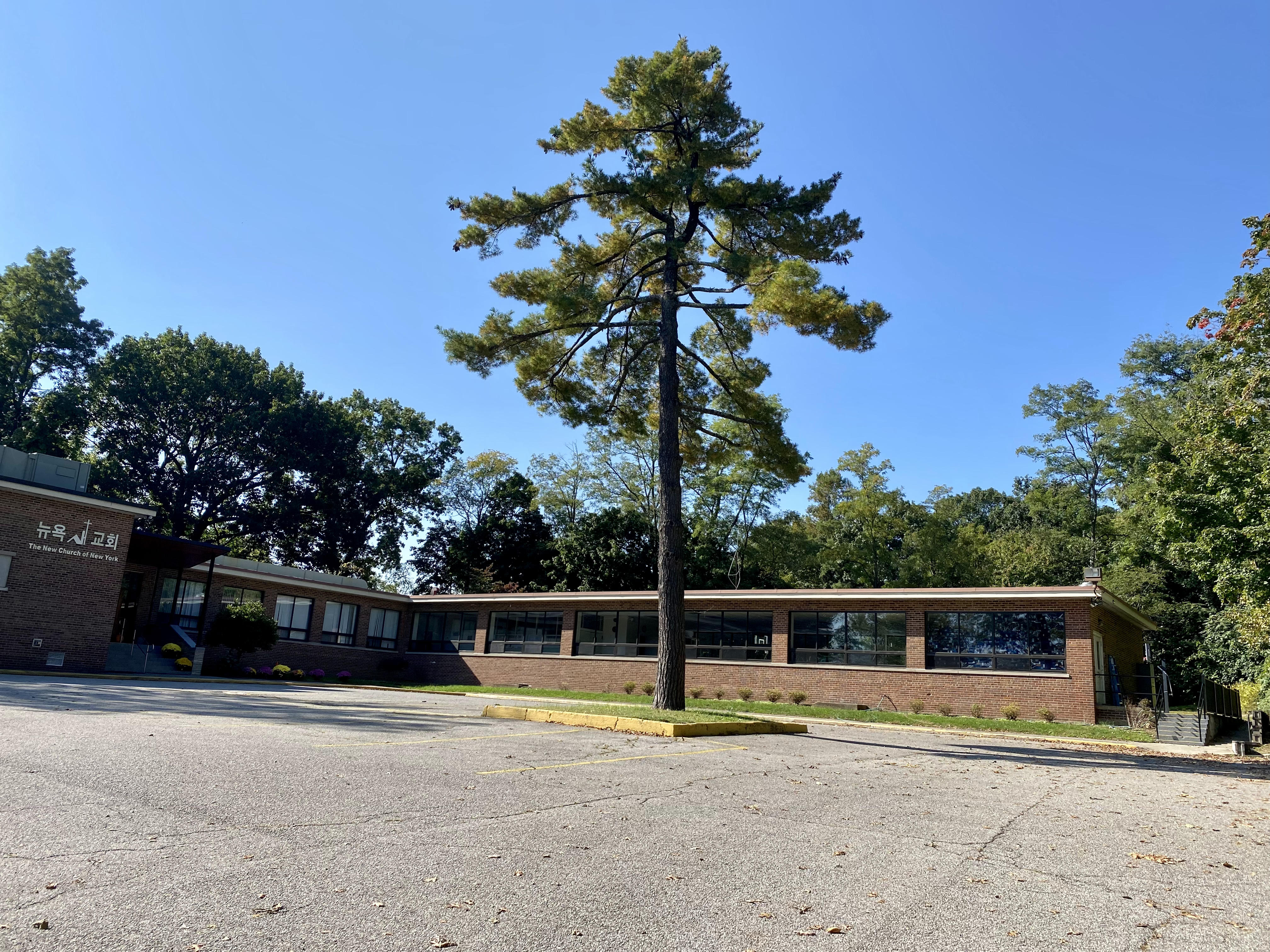
The Roslyn School District's former Highland School – now a church – in 2021

The Village of Roslyn Estates is located entirely within the boundaries of (and is thus served by) the Roslyn Union Free School District. As such, all children who reside within Roslyn Estates and attend public schools go to Roslyn's schools.

The Roslyn Union Free School District's former Highland Elementary School was located in the village; the building became a synagogue after the school's closure and would later become a church.

=== Library district ===
Roslyn Estates is located within the boundaries of Roslyn's library district, which is served by The Bryant Library. The Bryant Library is located in the adjacent village of Roslyn.

== Infrastructure ==
=== Transportation ===
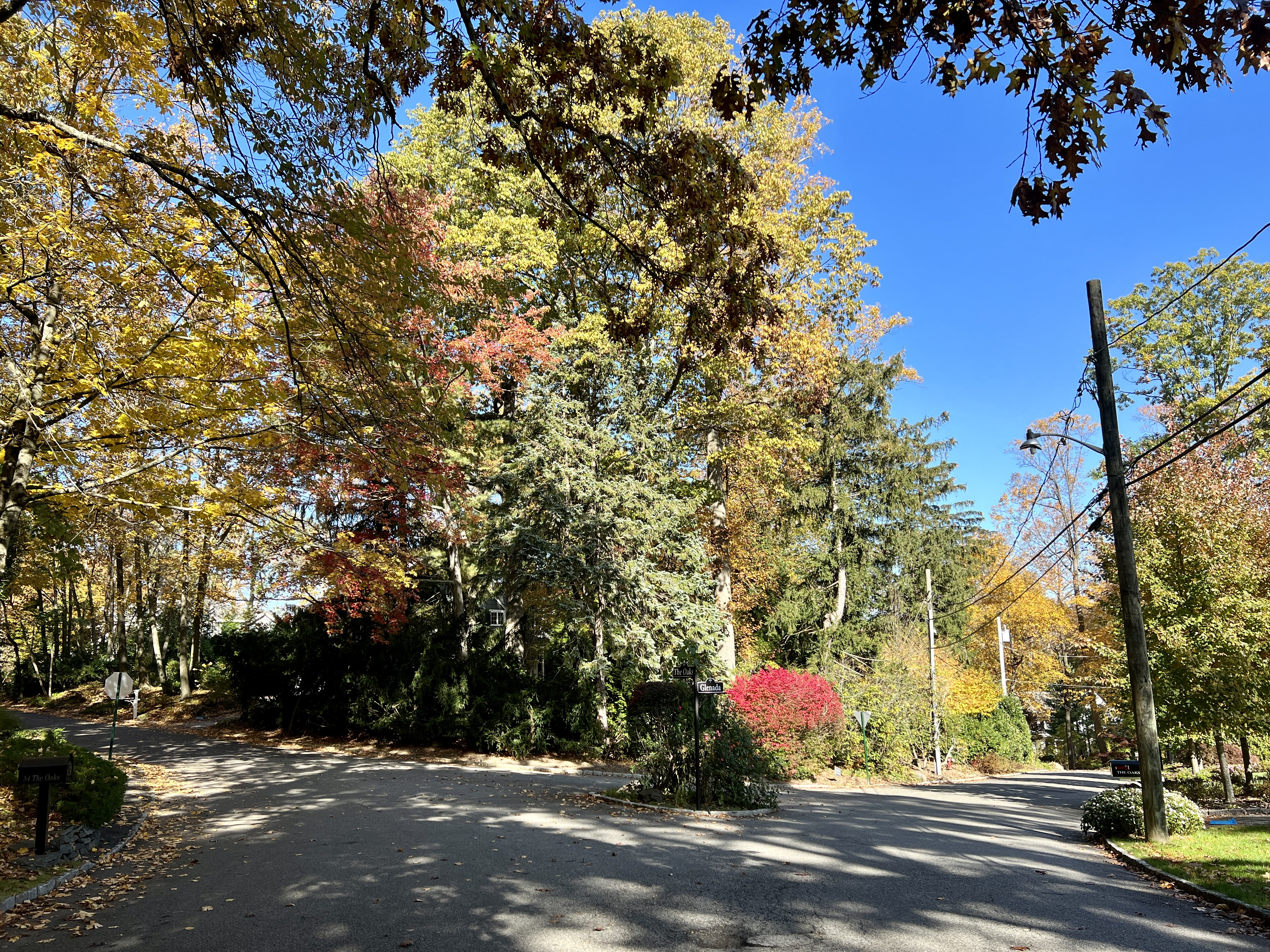
The intersection of The Oaks and The Glenada in 2021

==== Road ====
One state-owned road travels through Roslyn Estates: Northern Boulevard (NY 25A); Northern Boulevard forms the western half of the northern boundary of Roslyn Estates, with Flower Hill.

Other major roads within the village include Mineola Avenue (CR E64), Old Northern Boulevard (CR D71), and Searingtown Road (CR 101) (all owned and maintained by Nassau County); these roads form the eastern (with Roslyn), northeastern (with Flower Hill), and most of the western (with Strathmore, Manhasset) boundaries of the village, respectively.

Additionally, the Village of Roslyn Estates owns and maintains roughly 7.8 miles (12.6 km) of roads.

===== Street layout =====
Roslyn Estates features a winding and organic street layout, which meanders and can be unpredictable. Many streets, such as The Hemlocks and The Birches, use a street naming convention based on nature, including plants, flowers, and trees, and begin with "The."

==== Rail ====
No rail service passes through Roslyn Estates. The nearest Long Island Rail Road stations to the village are Roslyn on the Oyster Bay Branch and Manhasset on the Port Washington Branch.

==== Bus ====
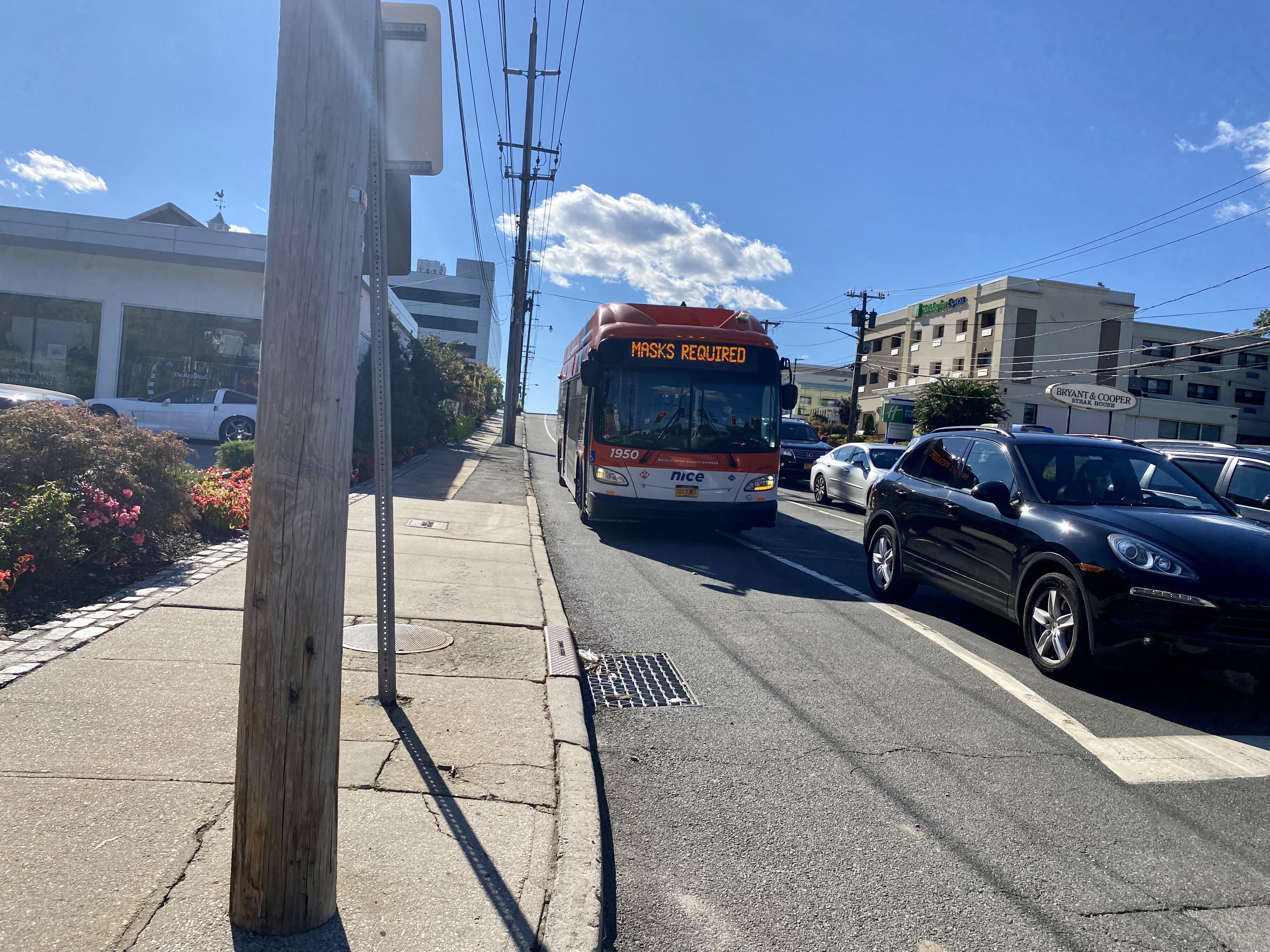
An n23 bus on Northern Boulevard in 2021

Roslyn Estates is served by the n20X, n20H, n21, and n23 bus routes, which are operated by Nassau Inter-County Express (NICE). These four bus routes travel through the area via Northern Boulevard and Old Northern Boulevard, along the northern border of Roslyn Estates.

=== Utilities ===
==== Natural gas ====
National Grid USA provides natural gas to all properties within Roslyn Estates that are hooked up to natural gas lines.

==== Power ====
PSEG Long Island provides power to all homes and businesses within Roslyn Estates, on behalf of the Long Island Power Authority.

==== Sewage ====
Roslyn Estates is partially sewered. The southern part of Roslyn Estates is within the Nassau County Sewage District, and roughly 60-70 lots were hooked up to it as of 2013. Another, smaller sewer district exists within Roslyn Estates, called The Birches Sanitary Sewer District. This village-owned district includes roughly 25 homes in the eastern part of Roslyn Estates and flows into Nassau County's sanitary sewage system at is southern end. All sanitary waste conveyed by sanitary sewers in Roslyn Estates, furthermore, is treated at Nassau County's wastewater treatment plants on the South Shore.

The remainder of Roslyn Estates lacks sanitary sewer connections and instead relies on cesspools and septic systems.

==== Water ====
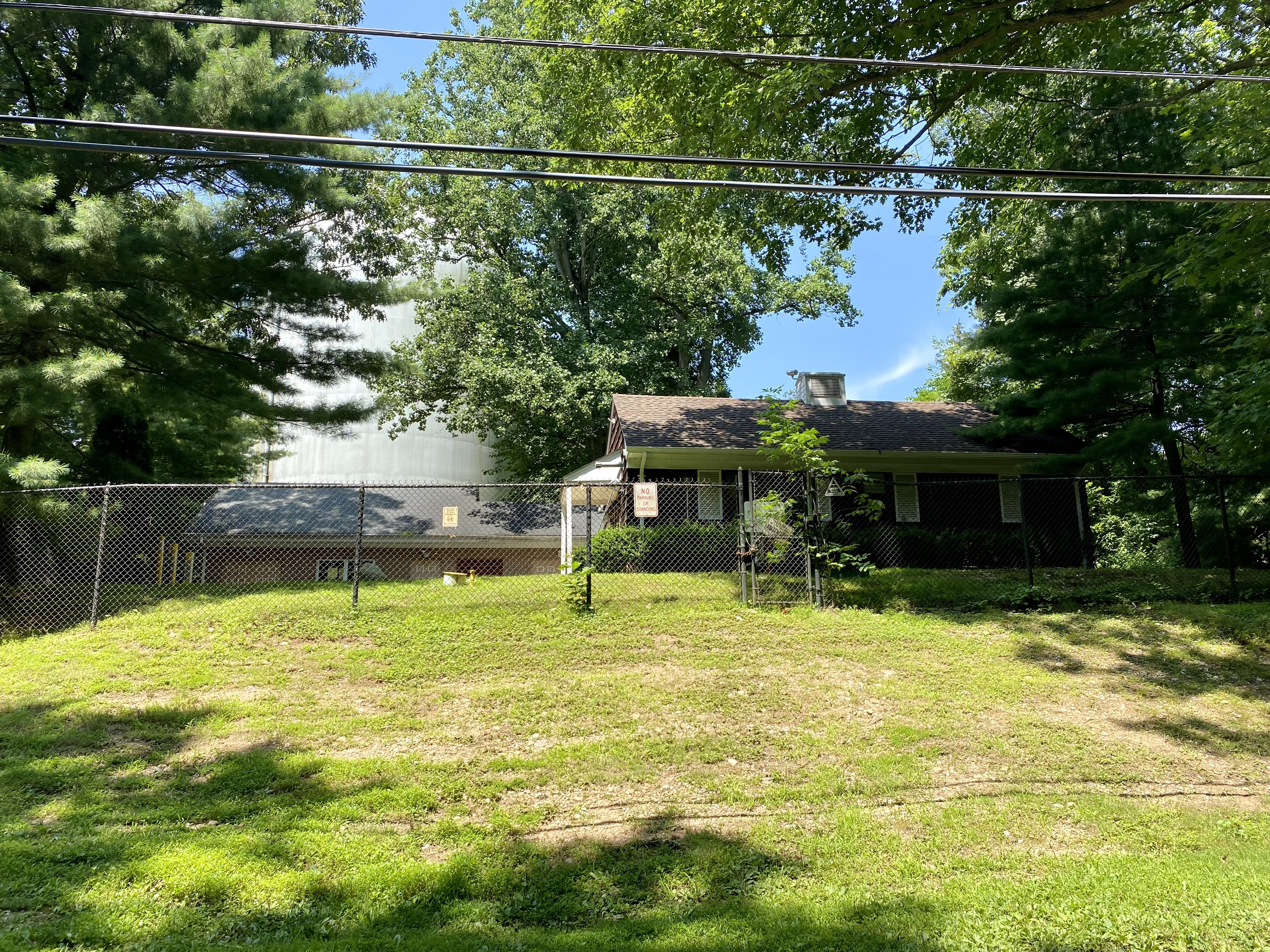
The Roslyn Water District's water facility on Dianas Trail in 2021

Roslyn Estates is located within the boundaries of the Roslyn Water District, which provides the entirety of Roslyn Estates with water.

=== Healthcare & emergency services ===
==== Fire ====
The Village of Roslyn Estates is located entirely within the boundaries of (and is thus served by) the Roslyn Fire District, which consists of the Roslyn Highland Fire Department and the Hook and Ladder Company No. 1 of Roslyn.

==== Police ====
The Village of Roslyn Estates is served by the Nassau County Police Department's 6th Precinct, with RMP 617 assigned as the patrol car for the entire village.

== Notable people ==
- Joel Connable – Television host, news anchor, and reporter.
- Allison Danzig – Sportswriter for The New York Times; author; lived on The Birches.
- Steven B. Derounian – Former United States Congressman.
- Fontaine Fox – Cartoonist and illustrator known for works such as Toonerville Folks.
- I. Michael Leitman – Surgeon and Dean for Graduate Medical Education at Mount Sinai Health.
- Lori "Loire" Cotler – Musician; grew up in Roslyn Estates.
- Bernard Madoff – Former NASDAQ chairman and Ponzi scheme swindler. Madoff and his family resided on Dianas Trail.
- Ruth Madoff – Wife of Bernard Madoff.
- Mark Madoff – Son of Bernard and Ruth Madoff.
- Andrew Madoff – Son of Bernard and Ruth Madoff.
- Christopher Morley – Author, journalist, and poet; lived on The Birches.
- David B. Pall – Chemist, inventor, and the founder of the Pall Corporation.
- Herb Sheldon – Children's entertainer; lived on The Glenada.
- J. Russell Sprague – First County Executive of Nassau County.

== Association of Roslyn Estates ==
The Association of Roslyn Estates is the civic association for the Village of Roslyn Estates. Founded in 1911, it is the oldest civic association in the County of Nassau. Its original headquarters was at the intersection of Mineola and Warner Avenues. This building still stands in that location, and is now used as a restaurant.

== See also ==
- List of municipalities in New York
- Roslyn, New York
- Roslyn Harbor, New York
- Roslyn Heights, New York
