= Roslyn, New York =

Village in Nassau County, New York, US

- Village
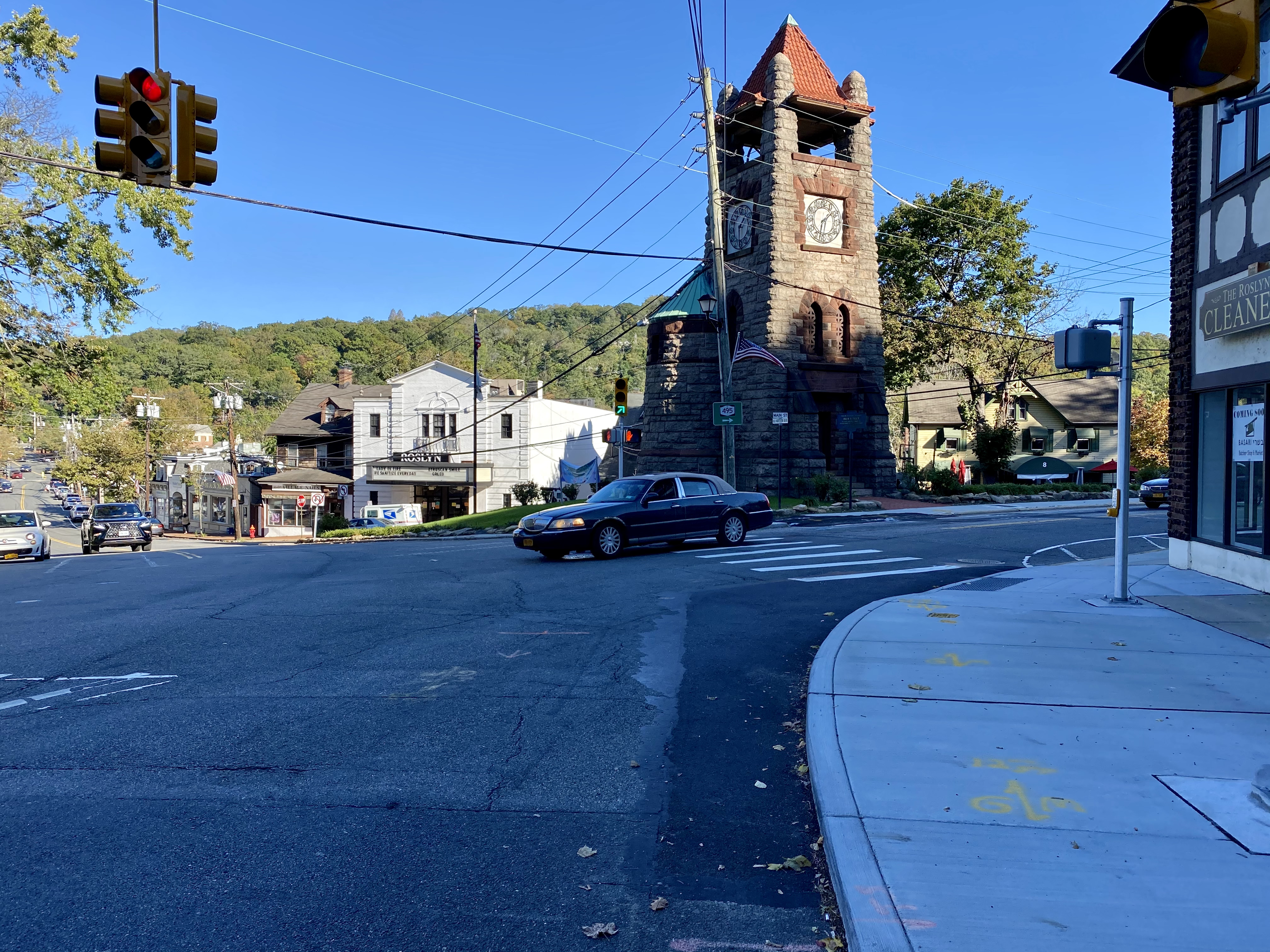
- Downtown Roslyn – seen from Main Street and Old Northern Boulevard – in 2020
- Nicknames: "The Village"; "Historic Roslyn"
- Location in Nassau County and the state of New York

- Location on Long Island Location within the state of New York
- Coordinates: 40°48′0″N 73°39′02″W
- Country: United States
- State: New York
- County: Nassau
- Town: North Hempstead
- Settled: 1643
- Incorporated: January 11, 1932
- Named for: Roslin, Scotland

Government
  - Mayor: John Durkin
  - Deputy Mayor: Marshall E. Bernstein

Area
  - Total: 0.66 sq mi (1.70 km^{2})
  - Land: 0.64 sq mi (1.67 km^{2})
  - Water: 0.012 sq mi (0.03 km^{2})
- Elevation: 98 ft (30 m)

Population (2020)
  - Total: 2,988
  - Density: 4,631.3/sq mi (1,788.17/km^{2})
- Demonym(s): Roslynian; Roslynite
- Time zone: UTC-5 (Eastern (EST))
  - Summer (DST): UTC-4 (EDT)
- ZIP Codes: 11576 (Roslyn); 11577 (Roslyn Heights)
- Area codes: 516, 363
- FIPS code: 36-63770
- GNIS feature ID: 0962929
- Website: www.roslynny.gov

Roslyn (/ˈrɒzlɪn/ ROZ-lin) is a village located within the Town of North Hempstead in Nassau County, on the North Shore of Long Island, in New York, United States. It is the Greater Roslyn area's anchor community. The population was 2,988 at the time of the 2020 census.

== History ==
=== Early history (pre-colonization to 1932) ===
What is now Roslyn was originally inhabited by Matinecock Native Americans. It was first settled by European colonists – primarily Dutchmen and Englishmen – in 1643. This new coastal settlement was originally called Hempstead Harbor, but its name was changed to Roslyn in 1844; the name was changed due to postal confusion regarding all the other "Hempsteads" scattered about Long Island.

On April 24, 1790, during a 5-day tour of Long Island, George Washington stopped for breakfast at the home of mill owner Hendrick Onderdonk. The Onderdonk farmhouse still stands in Roslyn on Old Northern Blvd, and now is known as Hendrick's Tavern. Myths say that Washington also slept there, but his diary doesn't say so.

The Long Island Rail Road reached Roslyn in 1865, with the completion of the Oyster Bay Branch as far north and east as Glen Head. Roslyn's train station opened at this time near Warner Avenue, in present-day Roslyn Heights. The introduction of rail service ushered in growth throughout the Roslyn community and improved its regional connectivity.

In 1874, William Cullen Bryant – who resided at Cedarmere in modern-day Roslyn Harbor and felt the community was in need of a social space where the public could read – erected Bryant Hall in Roslyn, on present-day Bryant Avenue. The building would serve as the original home of the Bryant Library – which would be established four years later, in 1878; the building was sold to the library in 1879 for $1 by Bryant's daughter, Julia.

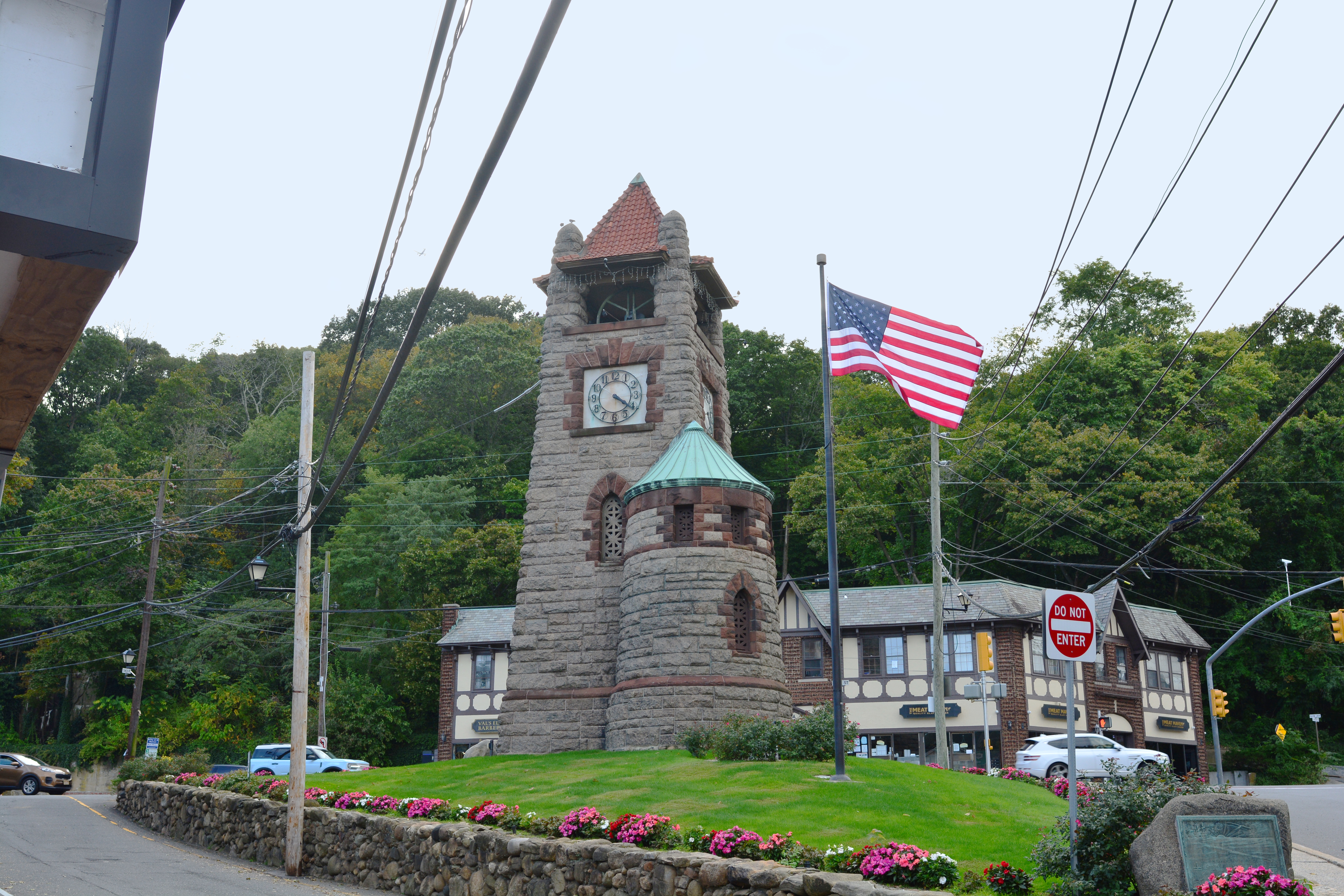
The Ellen E. Ward Memorial Clock Tower in 2025

In 1895, the Ellen E. Ward Memorial Clock Tower – one of the most famous structures in Roslyn – was completed. Built as a memorial to a prominent civic leader in the community, the clock tower was designed by Lamb and Rich.

In 1898, the original Roslyn Village School opened on Old Northern Boulevard, within Roslyn's downtown area. This school could accommodate up to 300 students and replaced an earlier schoolhouse that had burned on January 12, 1897. From its opening in 1898 until the opening of Roslyn High School in Roslyn Heights in 1925, the Village School served students in grades one through 12.

In 1907, electric trolley service was introduced in Roslyn, with the opening of the New York & North Shore Traction Company's trolley line between it and Mineola; an extension from Roslyn to Port Washington opened the following year, and a line to Flushing, Queens, was completed in 1910. The NY&NS trolley lines served the community until the company's collapse in 1920; the trolleys were subsequently replaced by buses.

On January 2, 1927, the 1898-built Roslyn Village School burned down. A new Roslyn Village School was subsequently erected behind the site of the 1898 school by the Roslyn School District; it opened in 1932 and closed in 1976.

In 1931, Gerry Park (then known as Roslyn Park) – a large park in the center of the village – opened. It was constructed by the Town of North Hempstead over a former swamp, which had been a notorious threat to public health and safety.

==== Push for incorporation (c.1930–1932) ====
On October 16, 1931, residents and civic advocates in Roslyn filed a petition with the Town of North Hempstead to incorporate their community as an incorporated village, aspiring to make it "the hub of the North Shore." This was the fifth such incorporation attempt made by Roslyn, which had planned to construct various public improvements and offer enhanced municipal services throughout the community.

The previous incorporation attempts failed in large part due to the incorporation of the modern villages surrounding it and which it wished to partially or wholly take in – such as East Hills, Flower Hill, Roslyn Estates, Roslyn Harbor, and North Hills. At least one such prior proposal – which would have included much of present-day East Hills – failed in part due to residents of East Hills (which then primarily consisted of large estates and farms) objecting to paying for sanitary sewers or many of the other municipal services they deemed unnecessary at the time, and wanting to govern themselves.

The territory to be included in the final attempt – greatly reduced following the incorporations of East Hills, Flower Hill, North Hills, Roslyn Estates, and Roslyn Harbor – included the unincorporated areas between Roslyn Estates and Flower Hill to the west and East Hills Roslyn Harbor to the east, from Hempstead Harbor south to Hillside Avenue (the village's present border with Roslyn Heights); these areas included Downtown Roslyn, Roslyn Landing and Lower Roslyn. Notably, Roslyn Heights – which had requested to be included within the new village's territory – was excluded from the proposal, spurring opposition to the proposal by residents of that community.

Nevertheless, in December 1931, the Town of North Hempstead – which had accepted the petition submitted as part of Roslyn's final incorporation attempt – scheduled the incorporation vote for Roslyn for that December 17; the Roslyn Heights area was excluded in part due to the repeated inability to unite the factions that had been opposing each other. Ultimately, during that referendum vote on the incorporation, the majority of participating Roslyn residents voted in favor of incorporating the community as a village; the tally was 38 in favor and 37 opposed – with most opponents voting against incorporation due to the exclusion of Roslyn Heights.

=== Incorporated Village of Roslyn (1932–present) ===
Roslyn officially incorporated as a village on January 11, 1932, following the issuance of its certificate of incorporation. Its first mayor was Albertson W. Hicks, who was unanimously elected to the position two days later, on January 13.

In the late 1940s, the 217-unit Roslyn Gardens co-op development was built. Located off of Warner Avenue, it was built in part with funding from Title 608 of the Federal Housing Administration and was the first major rental housing development built in the New York metropolitan area under Title 608's then-new provisions. The complex was designed by architects Max M. Simon and T. E. Merrill.

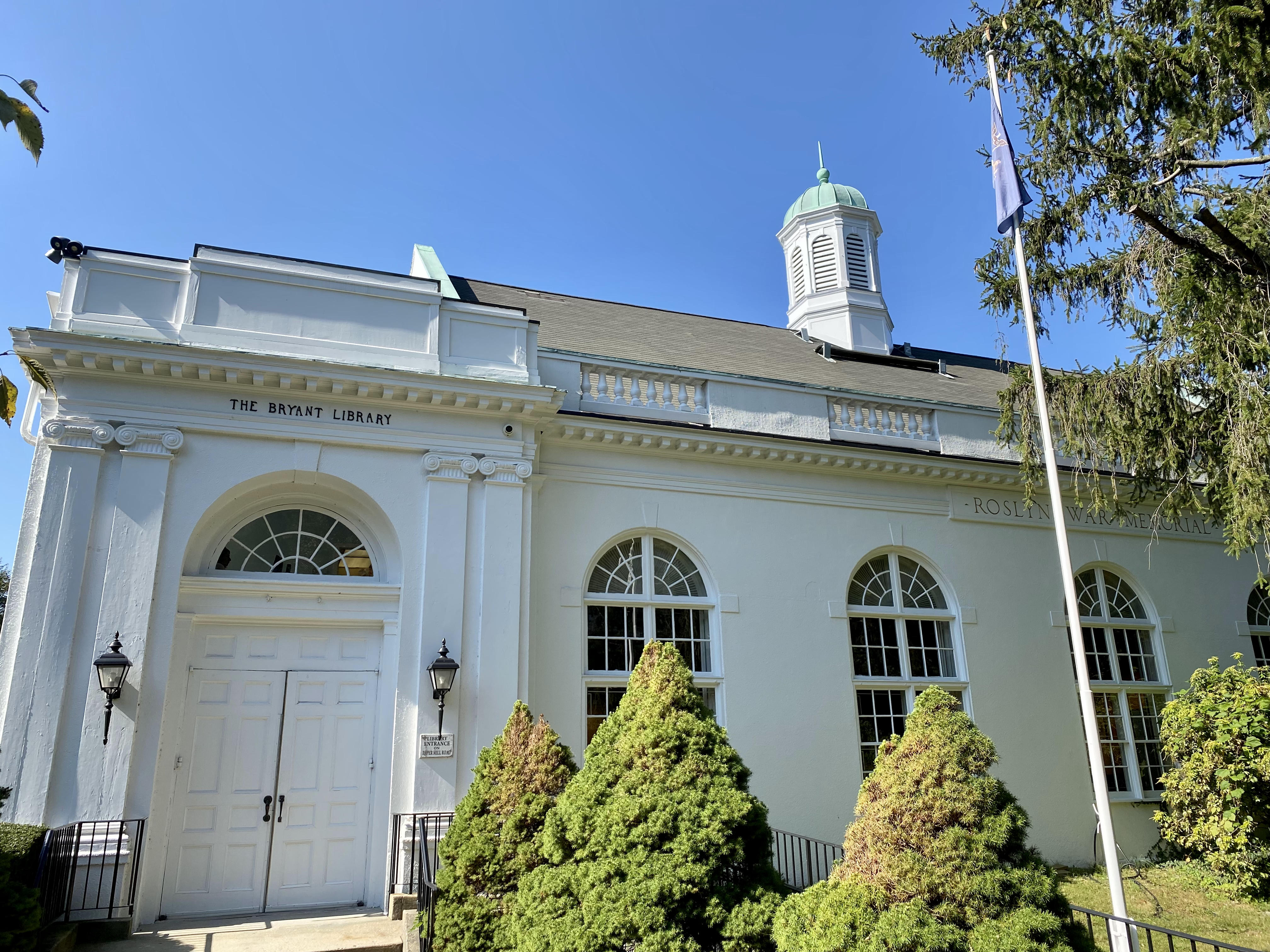
The front of the Roslyn War Memorial Building in 2021

In 1946, Bryant Hall – the original home of the community's Library – was acquired and demolished through eminent domain by New York state, for the construction of the William Cullen Bryant Viaduct; the library would operate at temporary locations from its eviction by New York state that year until relocating its modern, permanent home at the Roslyn War Memorial Building on Papermill Road in 1952.

On January 3, 1950, the William Cullen Bryant Viaduct opened to traffic. Built as part of the Roslyn Bypass – a realignment of New York State Route 25A within the Village of Flower Hill and the Village of Roslyn, the bridge's completion provided a bypass of Roslyn's downtown and alleviated a severe traffic bottleneck along Old Northern Boulevard through the community.

Also occurring in the 1950s was the redevelopment of the former Walbridge/Rubel estate in the village as the Roslyn Pines subdivision by Martucci & Sons. This residential housing development would consist of roughly 102 homes, along with a pool and tennis club; the houses in the development were designed by Roslyn-based architect Henry W. Johanson.

In 1976, following a decline in school district enrollment resulting from the end of the post-war baby-boom, the 1932-built Roslyn Village School was closed by the Roslyn School District. The property was later purchased by developers and redeveloped as a residential subdivision with single-family residences on a street named Old Schoolhouse Lane.

In 1995, the Ellen E. Ward Memorial Clock Tower was sold to the Village of Roslyn by the Town of North Hempstead for $1, in observance of that structure's centennial that year. It was subsequently restored.

Also taking place in 1995 was the opening of the Village of Roslyn's current Village Hall on Old Northern Boulevard. The village previously operated out of the historic Valentine House on Papermill Road, across from the Bryant Library.

In May 2016, ground broke on the large, 12-acre (4.9 ha) Roslyn Landing condominium development in the village's downtown area. The work also included an extension of the Roslyn Waterfront Promenade south to Old Northern Boulevard, along the east side of Roslyn Creek and Hempstead Harbor.

=== Etymology ===
The name "Roslyn" was selected as the new name for the community in 1844, replacing the earlier name of "Hempstead Harbor" (which reflected its location along the eponymous body of water) This new name was selected by officials, due to its location in a valley reminding them of Roslin, Scotland.

== Geography ==
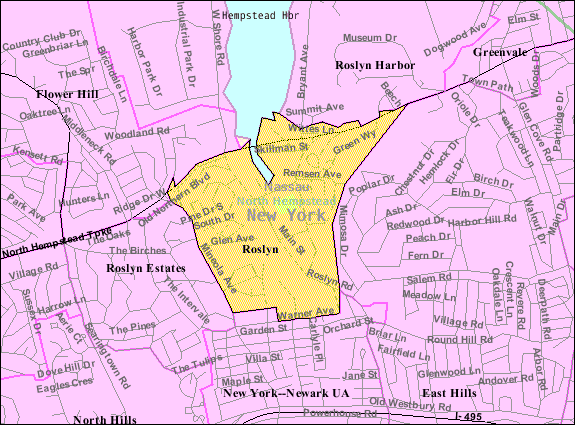
U.S. Census map of Roslyn

According to the United States Census Bureau's 2020 Gazetteer Files, the village has a total area of approximately 0.657 square miles (1.70 km^{2}), of which 0.645 square miles (1.67 km^{2}) is land and 0.012 square miles (0.031 km^{2}) is water.

=== Topography ===
Like the rest of Long Island's North Shore, Roslyn is situated on a terminal moraine, known as the Harbor Hill Moraine. This moraine was formed by glaciers during the Wisconsin Glacial Episode, and is named for Harbor Hill – the highest geographic point in Nassau County; Harbor Hill is located primarily within the adjacent village, East Hills – although parts of its western slope are also located within the Village of Roslyn.

According to the United States Environmental Protection Agency and the United States Geological Survey, the highest point in the Village of Roslyn is located near Piper Court, at approximately 253 feet (77 m). The lowest point is Hempstead Harbor, which is at sea level.

=== Geology ===
Roslyn is the namesake of the Roslyn Till – a geologic unit of the Manhasset Formation.

=== Drainage ===
Roslyn is split between two minor drainage areas: Hempstead Harbor (part of the Hempstead Harbor Watershed) and Mill River (part of the Mill River Watershed). According to the Köppen climate classification, the majority of Roslyn is within the Hempstead Harbor Watershed, meaning water in those areas drains north to Hempstead Harbor and ultimately into the Long Island Sound. Meanwhile, the southwestern edge of the village is within the Mill River Watershed, meaning water in that area drains south to the Mill River, thence ultimately into Hewlett Bay and the Atlantic Ocean.

Additionally, all of Roslyn is located within the larger Long Island Sound/Atlantic Ocean Watershed.

=== Climate ===
According to the Köppen climate classification, Roslyn has a Humid subtropical climate (type Cfa) with cool, wet winters and hot, humid summers. Precipitation is uniform throughout the year, with slight spring and fall peaks.

Climate data for Roslyn, New York, 1991–2020 normals, extremes 1999–present
Month	Jan	Feb	Mar	Apr	May	Jun	Jul	Aug	Sep	Oct	Nov	Dec	Year
Record high °F (°C)	71 (22)	73 (23)	87 (31)	94 (34)	97 (36)	101 (38)	108 (42)	105 (41)	97 (36)	89 (32)	83 (28)	76 (24)	108 (42)
Mean daily maximum °F (°C)	40.4 (4.7)	42.9 (6.1)	51.1 (10.6)	61.2 (16.2)	70.6 (21.4)	79.6 (26.4)	84.5 (29.2)	83.3 (28.5)	76.0 (24.4)	65.4 (18.6)	55.7 (13.2)	45.1 (7.3)	63.0 (17.2)
Daily mean °F (°C)	33.4 (0.8)	35.0 (1.7)	42.0 (5.6)	51.8 (11.0)	60.8 (16.0)	70.1 (21.2)	75.2 (24.0)	74.1 (23.4)	67.2 (19.6)	56.5 (13.6)	47.8 (8.8)	38.2 (3.4)	54.3 (12.4)
Mean daily minimum °F (°C)	26.4 (−3.1)	27.1 (−2.7)	33.5 (0.8)	42.4 (5.8)	51.0 (10.6)	60.6 (15.9)	65.8 (18.8)	65.0 (18.3)	58.3 (14.6)	47.6 (8.7)	39.9 (4.4)	31.2 (−0.4)	45.7 (7.6)
Record low °F (°C)	−4 (−20)	−5 (−21)	5 (−15)	13 (−11)	34 (1)	43 (6)	50 (10)	46 (8)	36 (2)	27 (−3)	17 (−8)	−2 (−19)	−5 (−21)
Average precipitation inches (mm)	3.56 (90)	2.87 (73)	4.47 (114)	3.85 (98)	3.23 (82)	3.54 (90)	3.97 (101)	4.26 (108)	4.31 (109)	4.08 (104)	3.18 (81)	3.99 (101)	45.31 (1,151)
Average snowfall inches (cm)	5.5 (14)	7.8 (20)	3.7 (9.4)	0.3 (0.76)	0 (0)	0 (0)	0 (0)	0 (0)	0 (0)	0 (0)	0.2 (0.51)	5.7 (14)	23.2 (58.67)
Average relative humidity (%)	73	75	72	72	75	74	73	71	73	73	71	75	73
Mean monthly sunshine hours	177	153	172	167	202	213	237	241	215	190	210	171	2,348
Mean daily daylight hours	9.6	10.7	12.0	13.3	14.5	15.1	14.8	13.8	12.5	11.1	9.9	9.3	12.2
Average ultraviolet index	2	2	2	3	5	6	6	6	5	3	2	2	4
Source: NOAA; Weather Atlas

== Demographics ==
Historical population
Census	Pop.	Note	%±
1940	972		—
1950	1,612		65.8%
1960	2,681		66.3%
1970	2,607		−2.8%
1980	2,134		−18.1%
1990	1,965		−7.9%
2000	2,570		30.8%
2010	2,770		7.8%
2020	2,988		7.9%
U.S. Decennial Census

=== 2010 Census ===
As of the 2010 census the population was 86% White (76% Non-Hispanic White), 2.2% Black or African American, 0.2% Native American, 8.85% Asian, 2.6% from other races, and 2.2% from two or more races. Hispanic or Latino of any race were 11.2% of the population.

=== 2000 Census ===
As of the census of 2000, there were 2,570 people, 1,060 households, and 603 families residing in the village. The population density was 4,082.2 inhabitants per square mile (1,576.1/km^{2}). There were 1,124 housing units at an average density of 1,785.4 units per square mile (689.3 units/km^{2}). The racial makeup of the village was 86.81% White, 2.33% African American, 0.08% Native American, 6.15% Asian, 2.02% from other races, and 2.61% from two or more races. Hispanic or Latino of any race were 6.34% of the population.

There were 1,060 households, out of which 25.8% had children under the age of 18 living with them, 47.3% were married couples living together, 7.1% had a female householder with no husband present, and 43.1% were non-families. 37.7% of all households were made up of individuals, and 9.5% had someone living alone who was 65 years of age or older. The average household size was 2.17 and the average family size was 2.89.

In the village, the population was spread out, with 18.2% under the age of 18, 3.6% from 18 to 24, 30.2% from 25 to 44, 25.3% from 45 to 64, and 22.7% who were 65 years of age or older. The median age was 44 years. For every 100 females, there were 83.8 males. For every 100 females age 18 and over, there were 78.4 males.

The median income for a household in the village was $72,404, and the median income for a family was $101,622. Males had a median income of $65,156 versus $45,221 for females. The per capita income for the village was $47,166. About 1.3% of families and 4.1% of the population were below the poverty line, including 2.9% of those under age 18 and 2.7% of those age 65 or over.

== Arts and culture ==
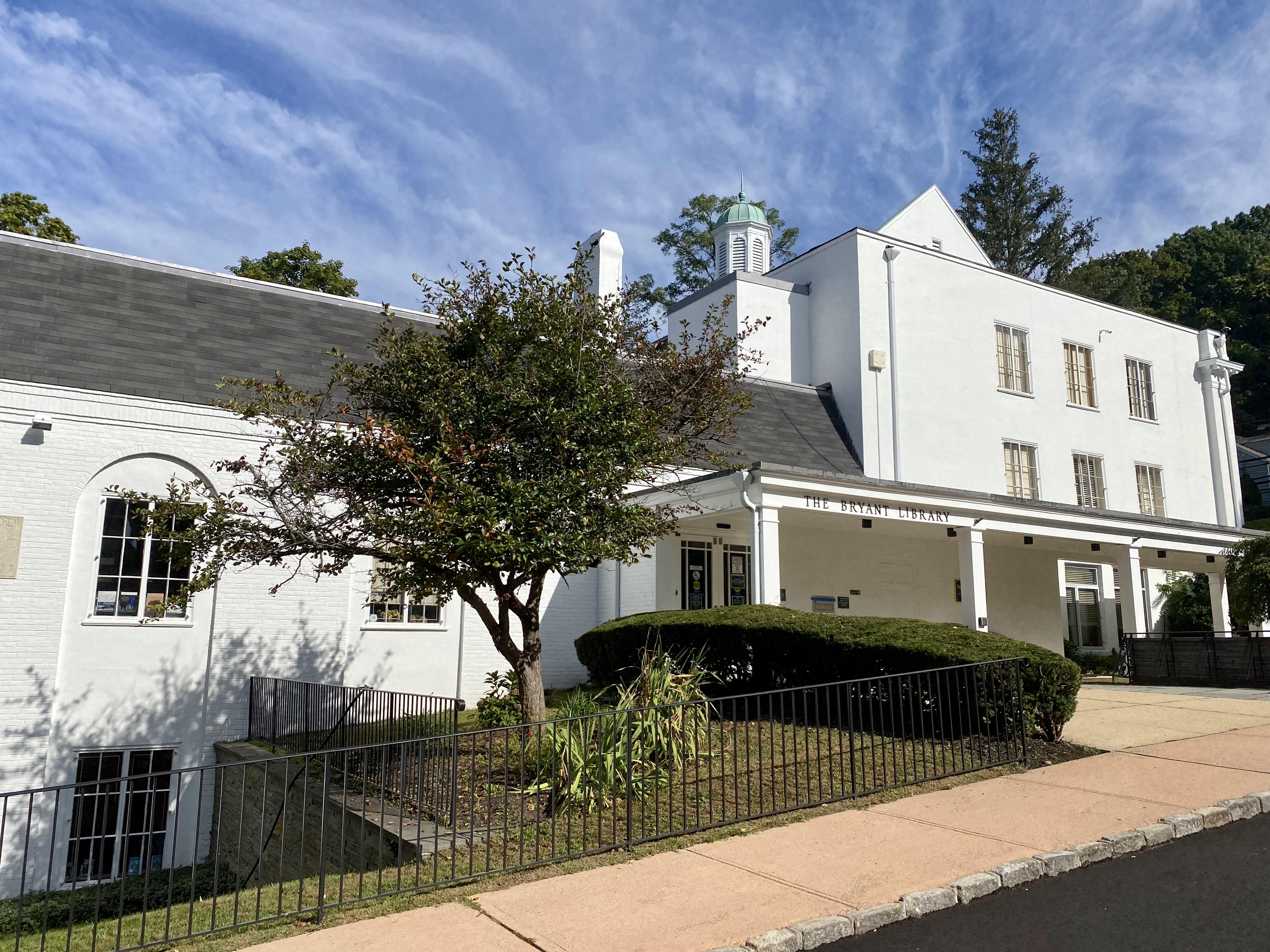
The Bryant Library in 2021

The Bryant Library is located within the Incorporated Village of Roslyn. This public library, which serves large portions of the Greater Roslyn area, frequently hosts cultural events for the Roslyn community and contains the Bryant Library Local History Center – the largest local library archive in Nassau County.

== Government ==
=== Village government ===
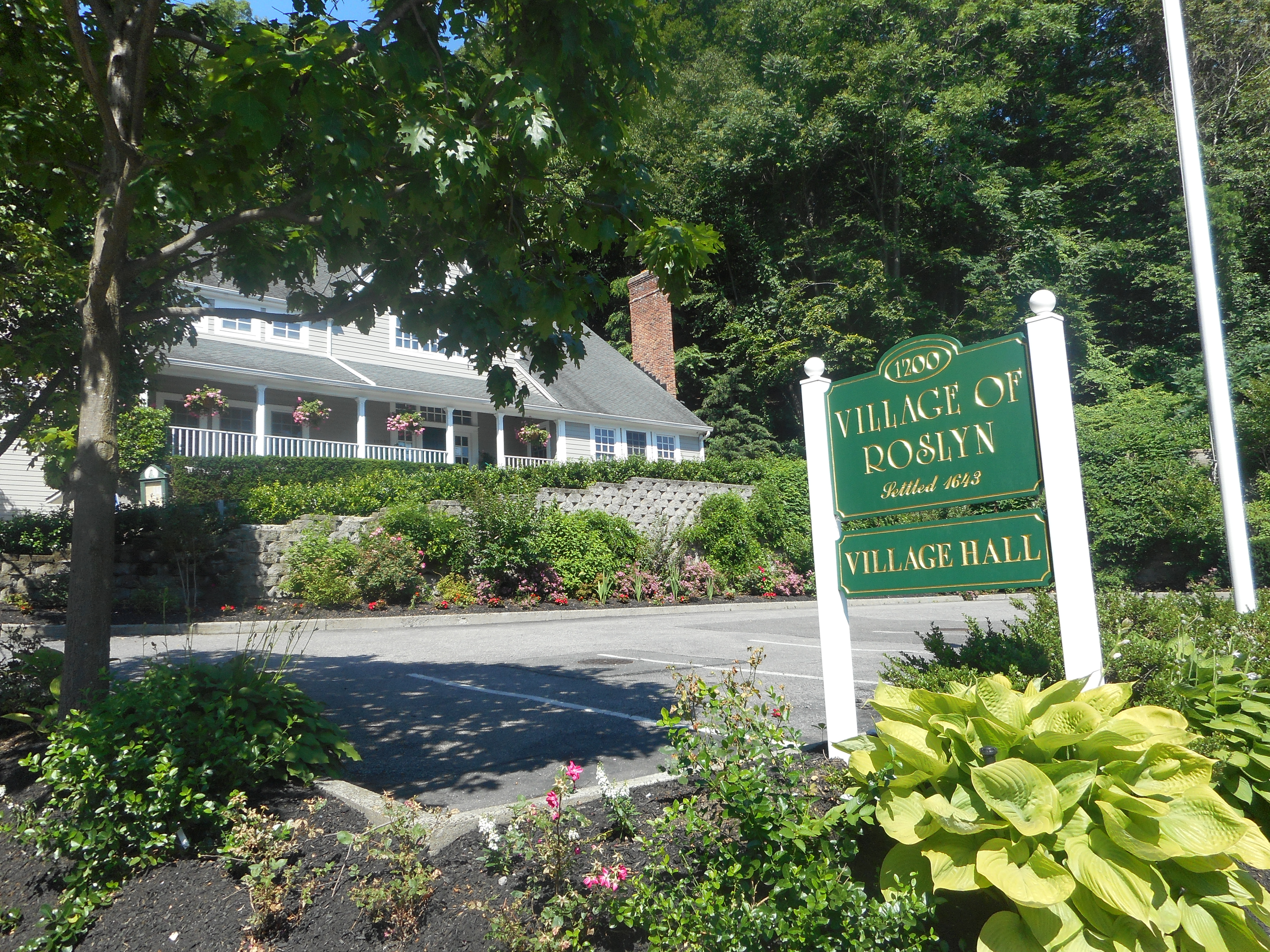
Roslyn Village Hall in 2016

As of July 2026, the Mayor of Roslyn is John Durkin, and the Deputy Mayor is Marshall E. Bernstein.

=== Representation in higher government ===
On the town level, Roslyn is located in the Town of North Hempstead's 6th council district, which as of July 2026 is represented on the North Hempstead Town Council by Mariann Dalimonte (D–Port Washington).

On the county level, Roslyn is located in Nassau County's 18th Legislative district, which as of July 2026 is represented in the Nassau County Legislature by Samantha Goetz (R–Oyster Bay).

On the state level, Roslyn is split between the New York State Assembly's 13th and 16th State Assembly districts, and is located entirely within the New York State Senate's 7th State Senate district. As of July 2026, these districts are represented by Charles D. Lavine (D–Glen Cove), Daniel J. Norber (R–Great Neck), and Jack M. Martins (R–Old Westbury), respectively.

On the federal level, Roslyn is located in New York's 3rd congressional district, which as of July 2026 is represented by Thomas R. Suozzi (D–Glen Cove). Like the rest of New York, it is represented in the United States Senate by Charles E. Schumer (D) and Kirsten E. Gillibrand (D).

=== Politics ===
In the 2024 U.S. presidential election, the majority of Roslyn voters voted for Kamala D. Harris (D).

== Education ==
=== School district ===
The Village of Roslyn is served entirely by the Roslyn Union Free School District. Accordingly, all children who reside within the village and attend public schools go to Roslyn's schools.

== Media ==
=== Newspapers ===
The Roslyn News–Times is the newspaper of record for the Village of Roslyn.

Other major newspapers serving Roslyn include Newsday, the New York Post, The New York Times, and The Wall Street Journal.

=== Television ===
According to the Federal Communications Commission, Roslyn – like all other communities on Long Island – is located within (and is thus served by) the New York, NY Television Market Area.

== Infrastructure ==
=== Transportation ===
==== Road ====
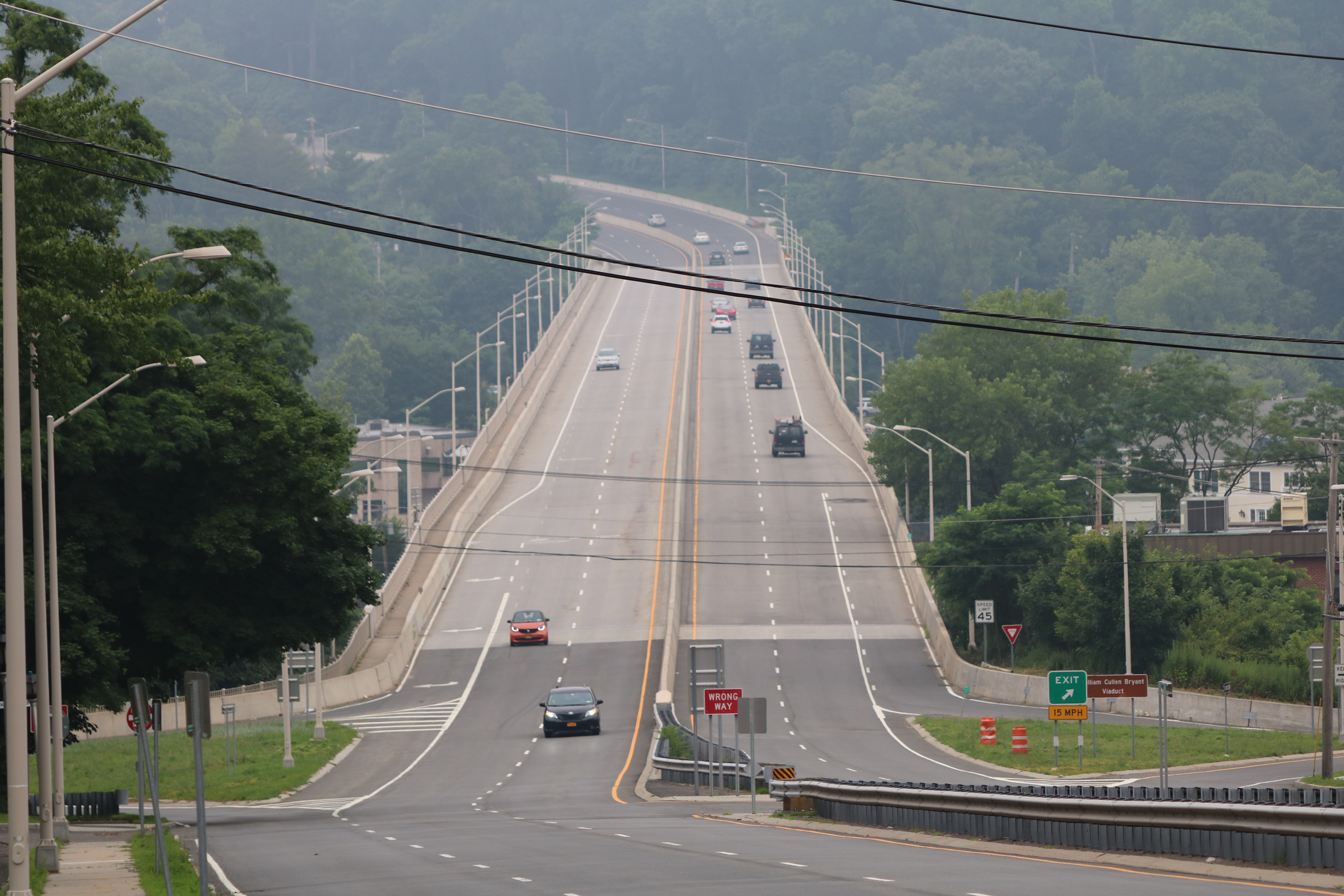
The William Cullen Bryant Viaduct connects with Flower Hill, Roslyn Estates, and Manhasset to the west

The William Cullen Bryant Viaduct (carrying New York State Route 25A) passes through – and serves as a bypass of – Roslyn. Prior to the opening of the Bryant Viaduct, NY 25A traveled through the heart of the village's downtown (along Old Northern Boulevard) and was notorious for its traffic jams in the area.

Other major roads located either partially or wholly within the village include Bryant Avenue, East Broadway, Layton Street, Main Street, Mineola Avenue, Mott Avenue, Old Northern Boulevard, Railroad Avenue, Roslyn Road, Tower Place, Walbridge Lane, Warner Avenue, West Shore Road, and Wittes Lane.

==== Rail ====
Although no train station is currently located within village limits, the Long Island Rail Road's Roslyn station used to be located on the Roslyn–Roslyn Heights border. It is now located completely within Roslyn Heights – immediately north of that border. This station, served by the LIRR's Oyster Bay Branch, is the nearest station to the village.

The Oyster Bay Branch additionally forms much of the village's eastern border.

==== Bus ====
Roslyn is served by five Nassau Inter-County Express bus routes: the n20H, the n20X, the n21, the n23, and the Port Washington Shuttle.

=== Utilities ===
==== Natural gas ====
National Grid USA provides natural gas to all properties within the village that are connected to natural gas lines.

==== Power ====
PSEG Long Island provides power to all properties and electrical infrastructure within Roslyn, on behalf of the Long Island Power Authority.

==== Water ====
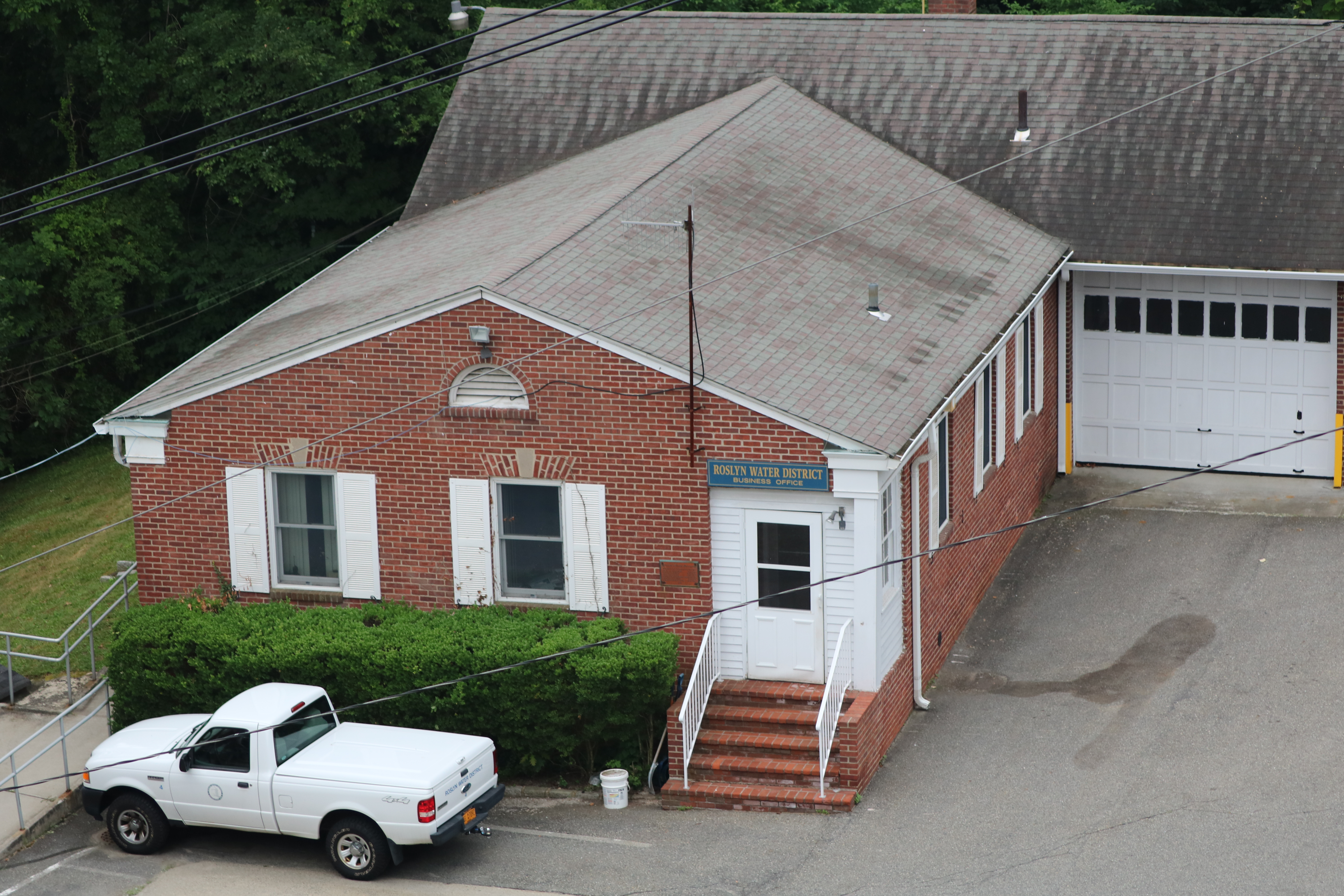
The Roslyn Water District's business office, located within the village, in 2018

Roslyn is located within the boundaries of (and is thus served by) the Roslyn Water District, which provides the entirety of Roslyn with water.

==== Sewage ====
The Village of Roslyn has a sanitary sewer system. The sewage from the Village's sewer system is pumped to and is treated by the Nassau County Sewage District's Cedar Creek Wastewater Treatment Plant via the East Hills Interceptor line, which connects the village's system with Nassau County's system and the Cedar Creek plant on the South Shore.

Prior to having the sanitary waste treated by Nassau County's facilities, the village's sewer system expelled the sanitary sewage locally into Hempstead Harbor, contributing to water pollution problems.

== Notable people ==
- Deborah Asnis – Infectious disease specialist; Asnis reported the first human cases of West Nile virus in the United States in 1999.
- Nathan Banks – Entomologist and arachnologist.
- John Michael Crichton - American author, screenwriter and filmmaker.
- Judy Steinberg Dean – Physician, First Lady of Vermont (1991–2003) and wife of former Gov. Howard Dean, and Roslyn High School graduate.
- Ken Hechler – Politician (D – West Virginia).
- Jesse Itzler – Entrepreneur, author, and co-owner of the Atlanta Hawks.
- Glenn Kurtz — Writer and author.
- Edward Lampert – Chairman of Sears Holding Company.
- Mike Makowsky - television screenwriter of I Think We're Alone Now, Bad Education, and Death by Lightning
- Frank C. Moore – Artist and AIDS activist.
- Lilly Pulitzer – Socialite and fashion designer
- Samuel Rubel – Executive.
- Whitney Tower – Former president of National Museum of Racing and Hall of Fame.
- Arthur Yorinks – Author and playwright, authored Hey, Al
- William Powell - Author of The Anarchist Cookbook
- Cornelius Vanderbilt Whitney – Businessman, film producer, government official, and philanthropist who was born in Roslyn.

== In popular culture ==
Scenes of The World According to Garp (1982) were shot in the vicinity of the Roslyn Clock Tower.

== See also ==
- List of municipalities in New York
- Roslyn Landmark Society
- Main Street Historic District
- Roslyn Village Historic District
