= David Pall =

Canadian businessman and chemist

David Boris Pall (2 April 1914 – 21 September 2004), founder of Pall Corporation, was the chemist who invented the Pall filter used in blood transfusions.

== Education ==
Born in 1914 in Thunder Bay, Ontario of Russian immigrant parents, he grew up on a farm in Saskatchewan. He attended McGill University, from which he was granted a bachelor's degree in chemistry and a Ph.D. in physical chemistry.

== Career ==
He moved to New York City in 1938 and became a part of the Manhattan Project. Pall worked on the design a filter to separate uranium 235 from uranium 238 using sintered stainless steel mesh.

In 1946, he established Pall Corporation. The company's initial focus was on the development of filters for use in aircraft hydraulics. However, in 1959, when Dr. Pall's first wife, Josephine, died of aplastic anemia, he began to work on the Pall filter. Mrs. Pall had undergone multiple blood transfusions in the course of an illness, which were ultimately unsuccessful. His Pall filter was designed to make blood transfusions significantly safer by filtering out white blood cells, thereby reducing the incidence of transfusion reactions and viral infections.

Pall expanded the business, adding additional products. Today, Pall Corporation has sales in excess of $2.0 Billion.

== Achievements ==
In his lifetime, Dr. Pall received over 180 patents and in 1990, he received the United States National Medal of Technology from President George H. W. Bush.

Pall was a trustee of the North Shore University Hospital.

== Death and legacy ==
Pall died of complications of Alzheimer's disease at his last home in Roslyn Estates, New York.

Pall's grandson is music producer Alex Pall of The Chainsmokers.
