= Hook Creek Bridge =

Bridge in Long Island, New York

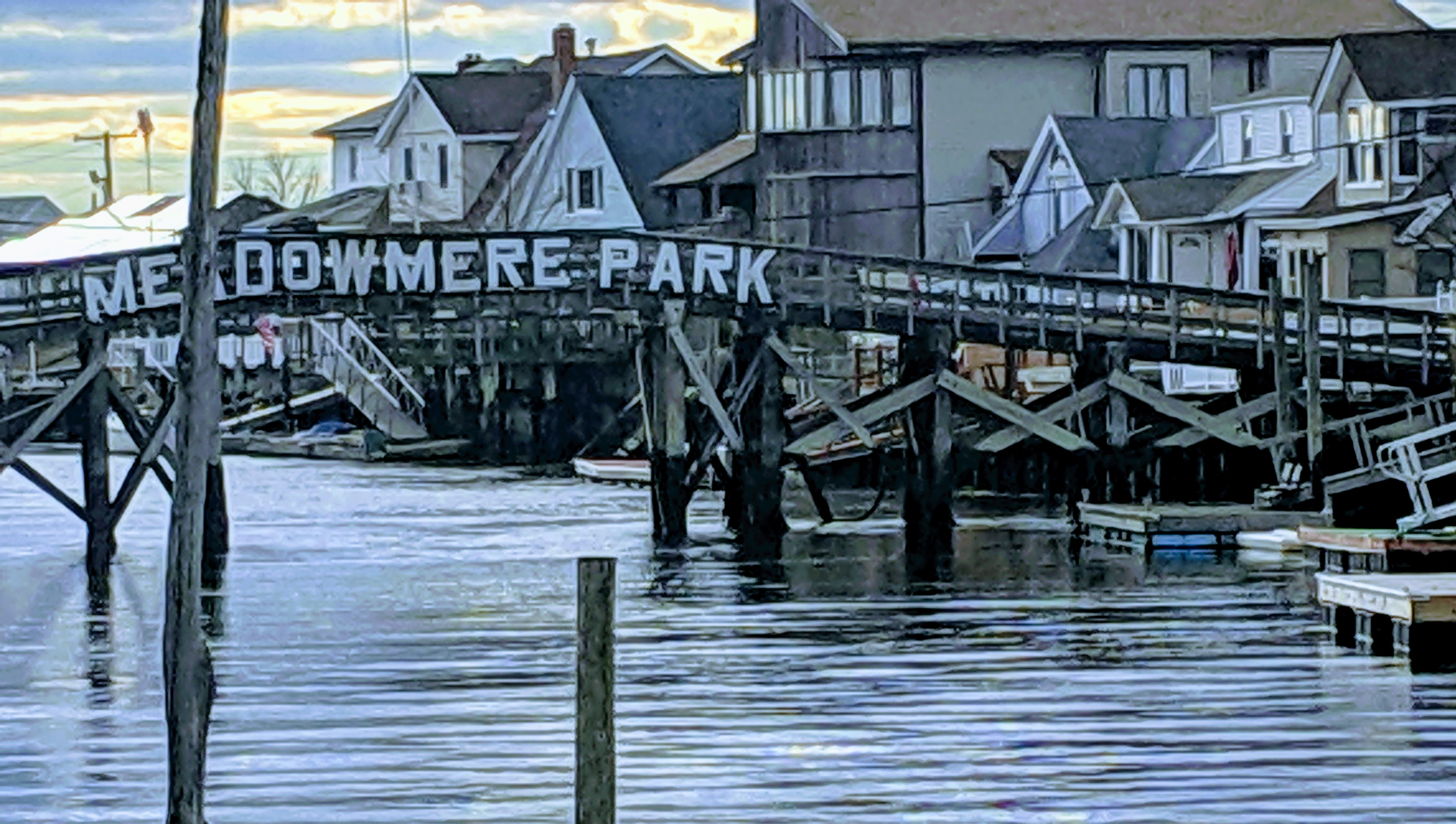
- The bridge, as seen in 2019.
- Coordinates: 40°38′11″N 73°44′31″W
- Crosses: Hook Creek

Characteristics
- Design: Footbridge
- Material: Wood

History
- Built: 1908

The Hook Creek Bridge is a wooden footbridge spanning Hook Creek on the South Shore of Long Island, New York. The 75-foot-long (23 m) bridge connects Meadowmere Park in Nassau County, New York, with the neighborhood of Meadowmere in Queens, New York City.

== History ==
The bridge originally opened in 1908. In 1923, ninety boathouses were developed in Meadowmere, marking the start of changes to the area. The John F. Kennedy International Airport runway is approximately 1 mile (1.6 km) away from the Hook Creek Bridge. By 1969, the bridge was in need of repair.

Meadow Camp was located near the Queens end of the Hook Creek Bridge. The Meadowmere area at Hook Creek Bridge was known for its duck hunting in the early 1900s. A picture taken by Charles Siebeneichen that is included in the Queens Library Digital Collection of 1926, shows a view from the bridge titled "Hook Creek Off Bridge.” Many families, including Charles Siebeneichen's family, spent the summers on Hook Creek meadow (on the Queens side) from 1875 to 1926. During the Great Depression, the Siebeneichen family spent their summers at the Meadow Camp boathouse and survived off of the land and fish caught in Hook Creek and the surrounding waters. According to Mary Louise Siebeneichen, "it did not look so good, but it was a place of peace care-free and happy for all who came to rest a while and live near God at "Meadow Camp." Summer 1926 farewell to a memory".

== See also ==
- List of bridges and tunnels in New York City
