= Meadowmere, Queens =

Neighborhood in New York City

Meadowmere
- Neighborhood of Queens
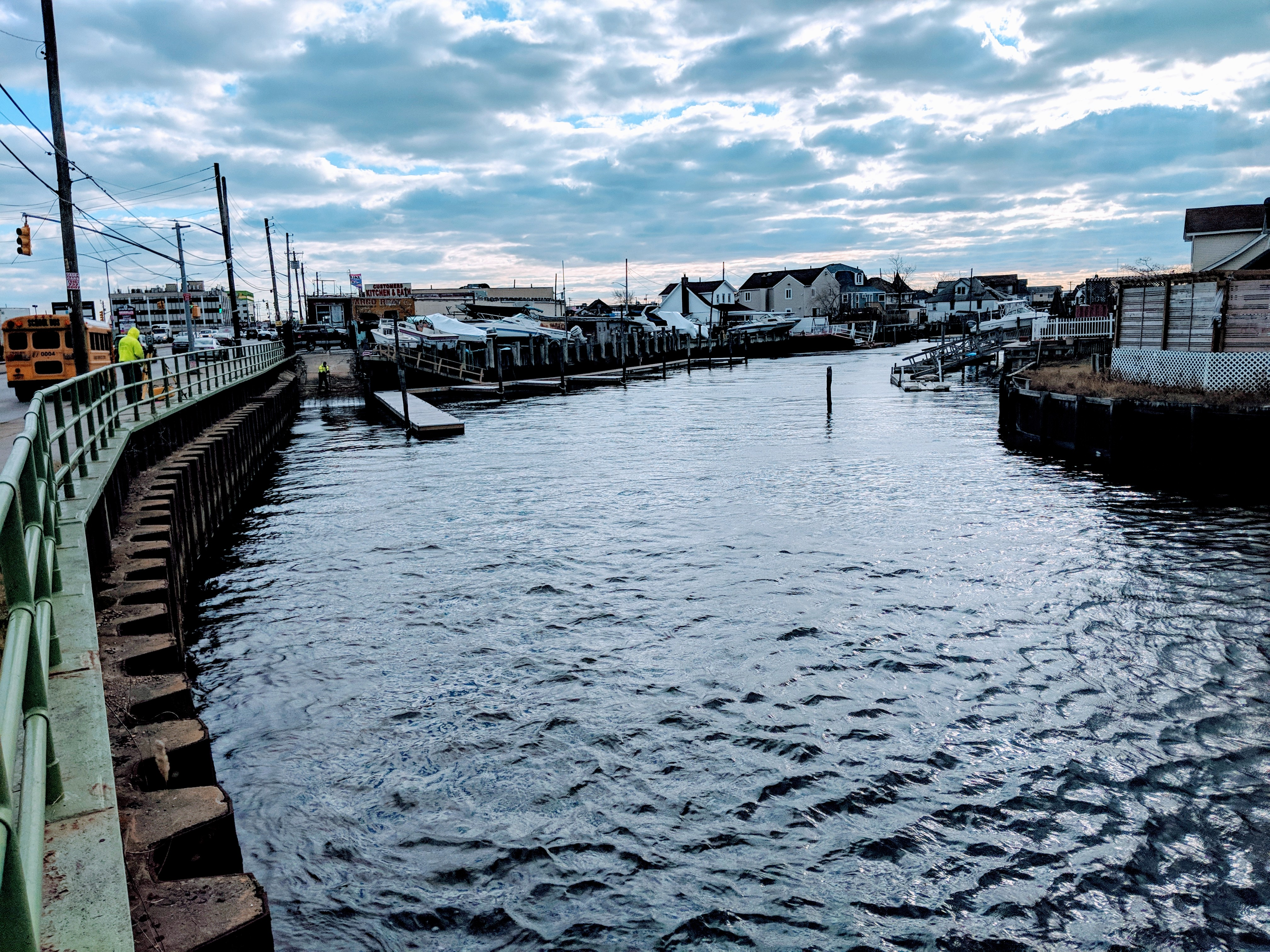
- Hook Creek at Meadowmere, AKA Head of Bay
- Interactive map of Meadowmere
- Coordinates: 40°38′16″N 73°44′28″W
- Country: United States
- State: New York
- City: New York City
- Borough: Queens
- Community District: Queens 13

Area
  - Total: 0.39 sq mi (1.0 km^{2})
  - Land: 0.23 sq mi (.6 km^{2})
  - Water: 0.15 sq mi (0.4 km^{2})
- Elevation: 6.6 ft (2 m)

Population (2010)
  - Total: 60
- Time zone: UTC−05:00 (Eastern (EST))
  - Summer (DST): UTC−04:00 (EDT)
- ZIP Code: 11422
- Area codes: 718, 347, 929, and 917
- FIPS code: 36-82942
- GNIS feature ID: 0971684

Meadowmere is a neighborhood in Queens, New York City. It is connected to Meadowmere Park in Lawrence, Nassau County, New York, which is part of the Five Towns area of southwestern Nassau County. Meadowmere is surrounded by Nassau County, and comprises just four streets and six blocks, bordered on the west by Hook Creek and on the east by Rockaway Boulevard.

== History ==
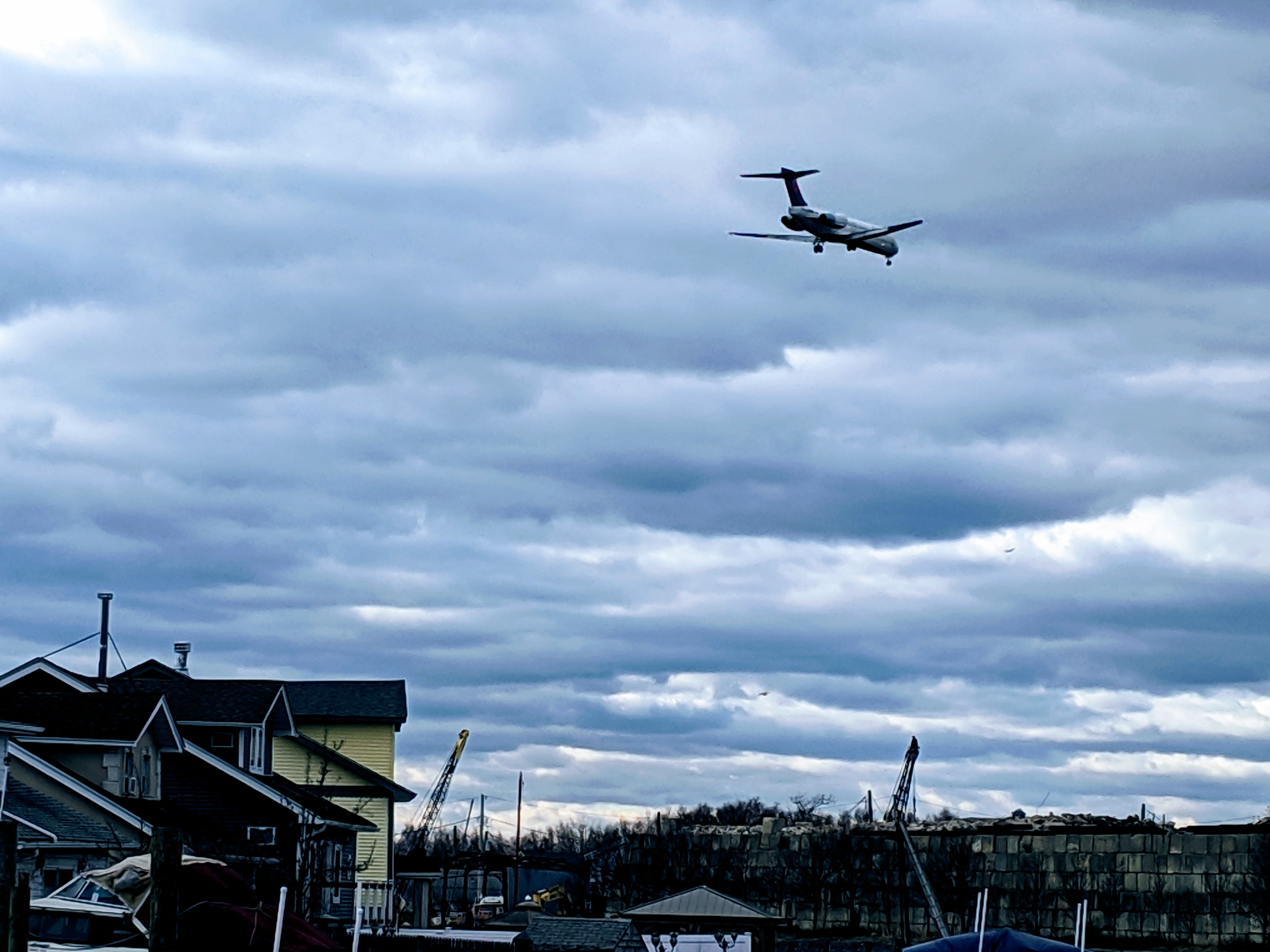
JFK overflight at Hook Creek

A footbridge across Hook Creek joins Meadowmere with Meadowmere Park, a neighborhood in Woodmere in Nassau County.

The spring for the creek originates under the Green Acres Mall, was built in 1956 on the northern portion of Curtiss Airfield. The creek was engineered and emerges on the Queens side in nearby Hook Creek Park before flowing through 300 acres (120 ha) of wetlands to Jamaica Bay, subsequently passing between the two hamlets.

In 1963, as part of planning the parkways of New York state, Parks Commissioner Robert Moses used eminent domain to seize portions of Hook Creek for a failed extension of the Nassau Expressway. The homes seized were demolished and ultimately the extension was never built. Since then, there have been plans to complete the expressway.

In 2007, the city began installing a sanitary sewer system in Warnerville and neighboring Meadowmere because some septic tanks had flooded into Jamaica Bay. Rising sea levels and increased storm surges such as Hurricane Sandy devastated the communities and many homes on the waterfront were lost, with residents living for months out of the volunteer firehouse in Meadowmere Park. Streets there had been raised 3 to 4 feet (0.91 to 1.22 m) but that was not enough for Sandy’s surges, which placed most homes under 5 feet (1.5 m) of water. As a result, many homes are in the process of being elevated in Meadowmere Park and the wooden bridge will be strengthened and widened to accommodate emergency vehicles. Even in normal weather, the streets in Meadowmere flood with each high tide.

== Geography ==
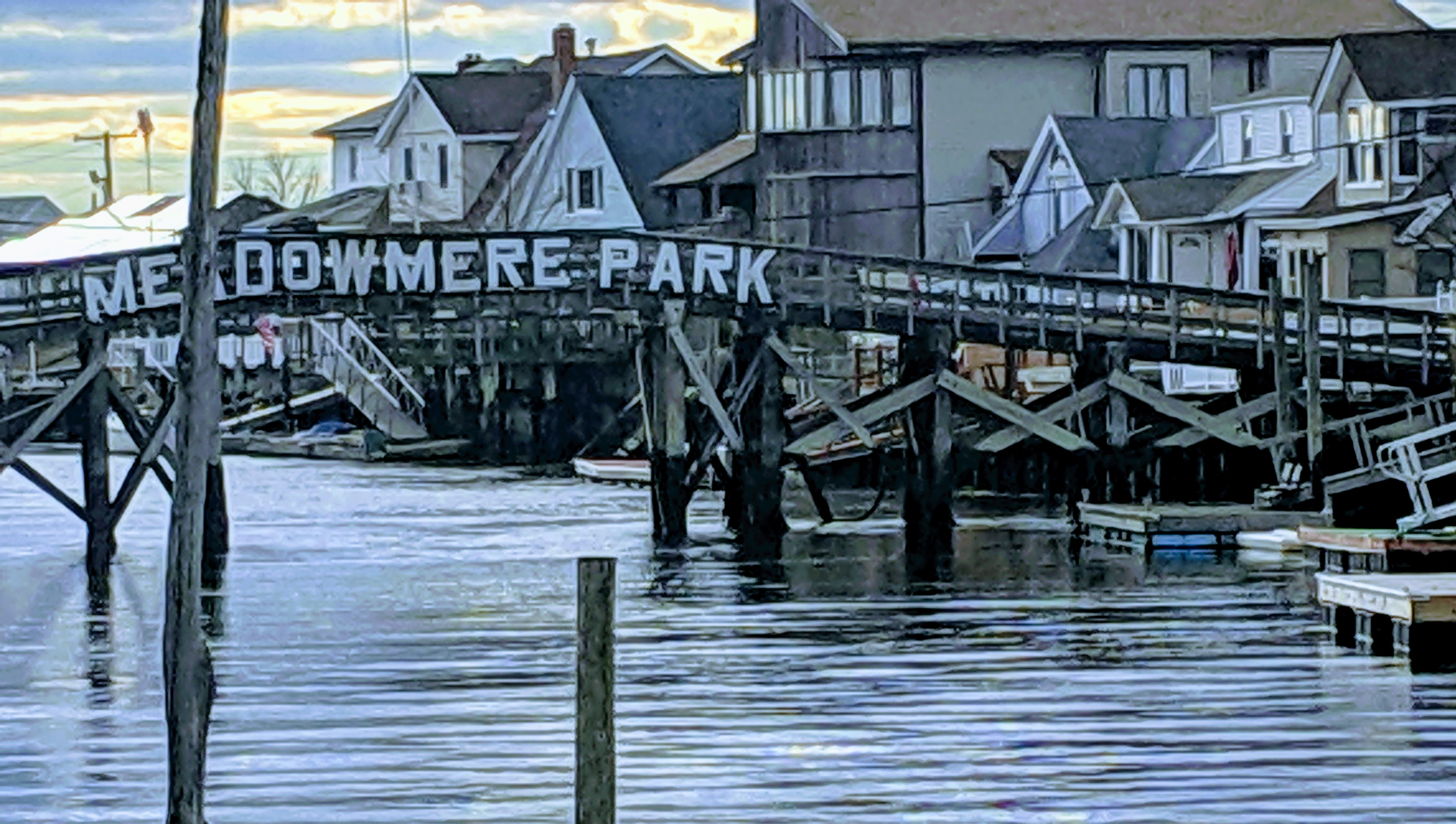
Meadowmere Park bridge on Hook Creek

Unlike the rest of the borough of Queens, the hamlet has three roads that do not conform to Queens street naming convention, simply named 1st, 2nd and 3rd Streets. The Rockaway Boulevard side separates the streets from the Five Towns Shopping Center.

One of the main roads of importance in Queens, Rockaway Boulevard, runs through Rosedale to Meadowmere, where traffic comes to a halt at Meadowmere's two traffic signals that separate southeast Queens from Lawrence.

=== Meadowmere Park bridge ===
The bridge and hamlet of Meadowmere Park is the only portion of Nassau county that is located west of Queens. It is along the main east-west flight path to the John F. Kennedy International Airport's runway which is approximately 1 mile (1.6 km) away from the Hook Creek Bridge. By 1969, the bridge was in need of repair. In 2016, $2.4 million in grant funding was secured to repair the 110 year old foot bridge and in 2018 the first contract of $243,615 was approved by the Hempstead town board. The bridge will be redesigned to provide emergency access for ambulances in addition to the other narrow meandering road of East Avenue, the only road into the small Island.

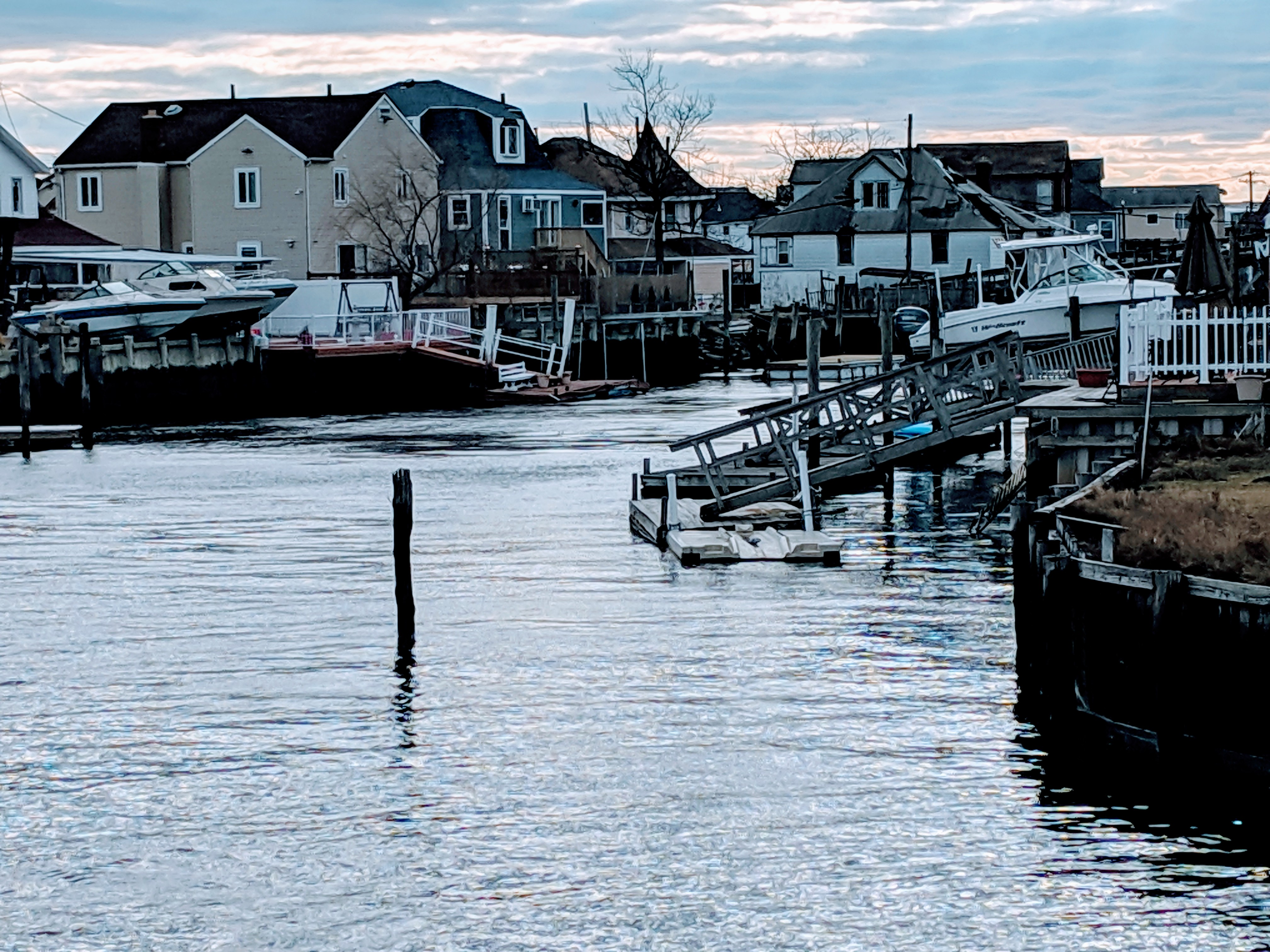
Meadowmere at Hook Creek

Opposition to replacement has since stymied the upgrade, residents wanting the current bridge fixed while Nassau town supervisors say the grants are for replacement and improving vehicular access.

=== Warnerville ===
Warnerville is adjacent to Meadowmere. It is surrounded on three sides by Jamaica Bay just to the southeast of John F. Kennedy Airport and comprises just three streets, bordered by Rockaway Boulevard on the east.
