= Mill River (Hempstead, New York) =

Location
- Country: United States
- Region: South Shore of Long Island, New York

Physical characteristics
- Mouth: Hewlett Bay
  - coordinates: 40°38′08″N 73°39′27″W

The Mill River is a river in the Town of Hempstead in Nassau County, on the South Shore of Long Island, in New York, United States.

== Description ==
The Mill River runs between the Village of Hempstead, just north of Hempstead Turnpike (New York State Route 24), and Hewlett Bay. The waters flow towards the south and ultimately into Hewlett Bay.

Communities which the Mill River passes through include East Rockaway, Lynbrook, Rockville Centre, and West Hempstead.

Another Mill River exists on Long Island, located in the Town of Oyster Bay on the North Shore.

== Mill River Watershed ==
The Mill River Watershed is a watershed which drains into the Mill River and ultimately into Hewlett Bay. It stretches from the North Shore down to the bay. Hempstead Lake (located in Hempstead Lake State Park) is a sub-watershed of the Mill River Watershed, as the water from Hempstead Lake flows into the Mill River, via South Pond and Smith Lake.

Notable communities either partially or wholly within the Mill River Watershed include East Hills, East Rockaway, Garden City, Hempstead, Lakeview, Malverne, Mineola, Oceanside, Old Westbury, Rockville Centre, Roslyn Estates, Roslyn Heights, and West Hempstead.

== See also ==
- Carmans River – Another north-south river on Long Island.
- Connetquot River – Another north-south river on Long Island.
- Motts Creek – An adjacent north-south river on Long Island, located slightly to the west.
