= Pall Corporation =

Global supplier of filtration, separations and purification products

- Type: Subsidiary of Danaher Corporation
- Industry: Diversified Machinery
- Founded: 1946, New York City
- Headquarters: Port Washington, New York, United States
- Key people: Jennifer Honeycutt; President & CEO; Martin A. Smith; Chief Technology Officer; Yves Baratelli; President, Pall Life Sciences; Ruby R. Chandy; President, Pall Industrial; Michael Egholm Ph.D. President, BioPharmaceuticals; Roberto Gregori; VP, Pall Aerospace; Naresh Narasimhan; President, Pall Asia; Roya Behnia; Senior Vice President, General Counsel & Corporate Secretary; Hanjoon Alex Kim; Sr. Vice President, Corporate Strategy; Angelina Rouse; Chief Accounting Officer
- Revenue: ▲US $ 2.789 Billion (FY 2014)
- Net income: ▲US $ 364 Million (FY 2014)
- Number of employees: 10,900 (FY 2011)
- Parent: Danaher Corporation
- Website: www.pall.com

Pall Corporation, headquartered in Port Washington, New York and a wholly owned subsidiary of Danaher Corporation since 2015, is a global supplier of filtration, separations and purification products. Total revenues for fiscal year 2014 were $2.8 billion, with $103 million spent on R&D. Pall Corporation's business is split into two broad groups: Life Sciences (c.51%) and Industrial (c.49%). These business groups provide fluid management products and systems to customers in biotechnology, pharmaceutical, transfusion medicine, energy, electronics, municipal and industrial water purification, aerospace, transportation and broad industrial markets.

The company was founded by David B. Pall in 1946 as Micro Metallic Corporation.

== History ==
Founded in 1946 as Micro Metallic Corporation. In 1953, Pall purchased an industrial building at 30 Sea Cliff Ave, Glen Cove, NY (occupied until 1999). In 1958, Pall Corporation constructed a building at 36 Sea Cliff Ave (occupied it until 1971, when Pall Corporation sold the building to August Thomsen). The company was renamed Pall Corp in 1957. In 1958 Pall began to develop filters for use in aircraft hydraulics, applied to the landing gears of American Airlines Boeing 707s. Then, Pall developed filters to purify jet fuel.

Through the 1960s, the business expanded, with sales of $6.7 million in 1960. Pall Europe Limited formed in 1966. Pall Cortland was established in 1961, purchased from Trinity Equipment Company.

In the 1970s, Pall became a leader in fine filtration. Sales reached $88 million in 1978. Major contribution in medical applications. Pall played a major role in the cleanup of the 1979 Three Mile Island nuclear accident.

The company continued to grow in the 80's and 90's, adding applications and products. In the mid-80's, Pall contributed to the construction of the Eurotunnel under the English Channel, providing solutions to hydraulic operations needed to bore through the channel bedrock. In 1988, they began selling a filter for blood transfusions that reduced leukocyte levels below all other existing filters. Centrisep air cleaners were integrated into U.S. Army and Royal Air Force (UK) helicopters to reduce sand and dust out of engines during Operation Desert Storm in 1991. In 1997 the company acquired Gelman sciences, and in 1998, Pall acquired German company Rochem.

In response to an article in Forbes magazine about dioxane in Michigan, Farsad Fotouhi, VP of Life Sciences division, responded "Pall is in full compliance with the Consent Judgment it entered with the Michigan Department of Environmental Quality (MDEQ), which serves as the legal framework for the cleanup." Later in 2013, Scio Township Supervisor Clark said he's heard from Fotouhi that there will be a staff of about 20 people that will remain on the site.

On May 31, 2015, Danaher Corporation announced it would acquire Pall Corporation. The transaction closed in August 2015, with Danaher paying $127.20 per share or about $13.8 billion. The acquisition was completed on August 31, 2015.

In September 2022, it was announced that Pall Life Sciences will be merging with Cytiva to create a new Biotechnology Group within Danaher.

== Details ==
Today, the company is divided into two separate, integrated businesses: Pall Life Sciences and Pall Industries. The Scientific & Lab Services employed 175 people worldwide at 29 locations, in 2011. The R&D group has 12 sites, with seven in the United States. The main industrial technical center is at Cortland, NY.

Pall has plants in New Port Richey, DeLand, Florida, Cortland, New York, Timonium, Maryland, Fajardo, Puerto Rico, Ilfracombe, Portsmouth and locations around the world. In 2013 it announced plans to close its plants in Ann Arbor and Fort Myers, Florida.

== Achievements ==
- 1990: Dr. Pall is awarded the National Medal of Technology for patenting and commercializing over 100 filtration and other fluid clarification products beneficial to society and for building Pall Corporation into a global company.
- 2008: Dr. Pall is posthumously inducted into the National Inventors Hall of Fame for his invention of the leukoreduction filter.
- 2009: Pall Corporation is named one of the greenest companies in America in Newsweek’s September 28 issue. The company was ranked second in the industrial goods sector and 47th among America's largest companies.
- 2011: Pall Corporation is awarded the Engineering Materials Achievement Award (EMAA) by ASM International. The company was recognized for its porous iron aluminide technology.
- 2011: Pall Corporation is named a top green company in Newsweek's third annual Green Rankings. The company was ranked fifth in the capital goods sector and 69th among the U.S. 500 list.
