= Motts Creek (Nassau County, New York) =

Stream in Nassau County, New York

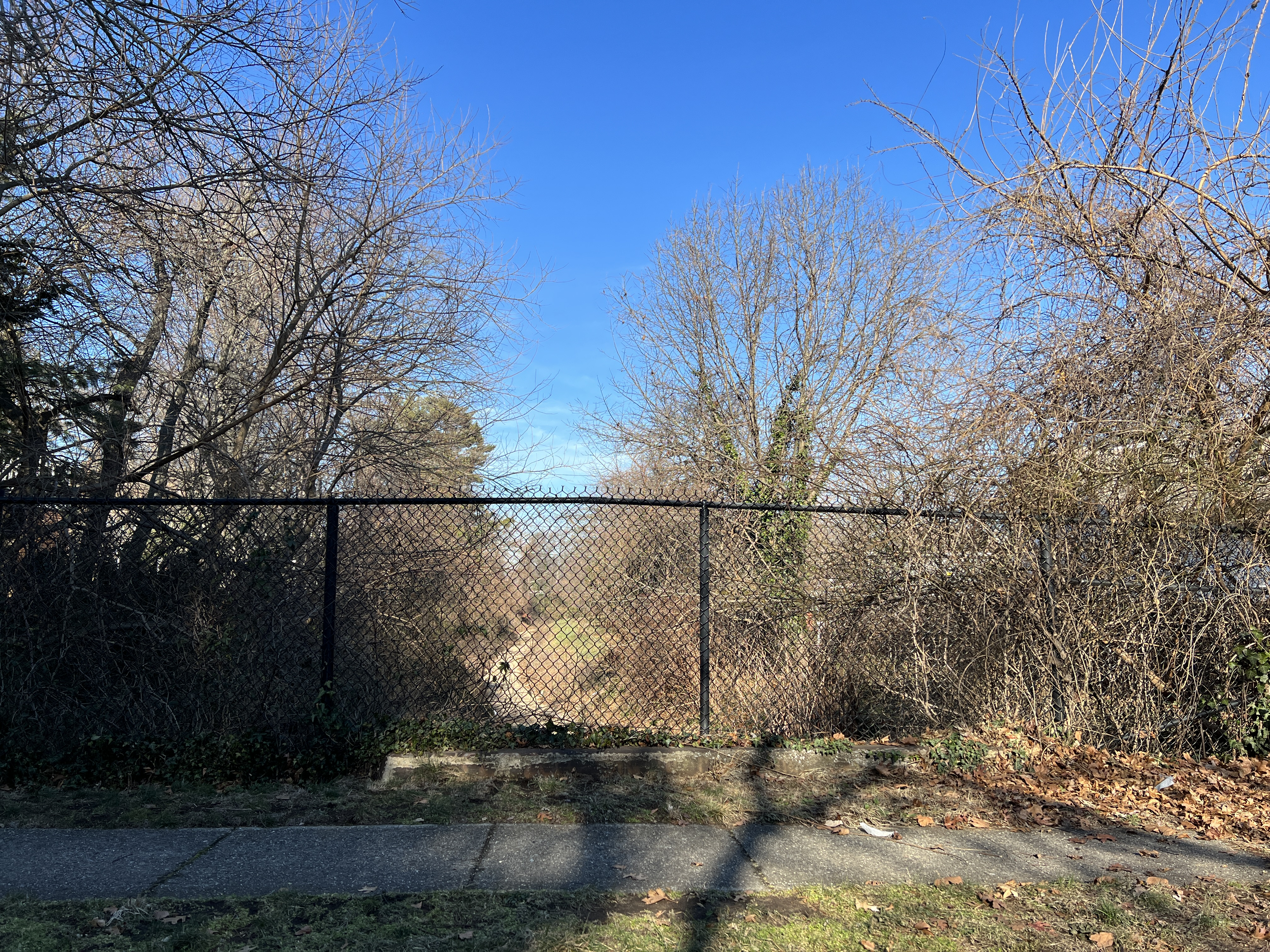
- A dry section of Motts Creek in 2022.

Location
- Country: United States
- Region: South Shore of Long Island, New York

Physical characteristics
- Mouth: Jamaica Bay
  - coordinates: 40°37′55″N 73°44′42″W

Motts Creek (also known as Foster's Brook) is a stream in the Town of Hempstead in Nassau County, on the South Shore of Long Island, in New York, United States.

== Description ==
Motts Creek runs between Franklin Square and Jamaica Bay. The creek begins underneath Rath Park in Franklin Square, flowing towards the south, west, and southwest to Jamaica Bay.

Communities which Motts Creek passes through include Franklin Square, Lynbrook, Malverne, Valley Stream, and Woodmere.

Many portions of the creek have been redirected over the years as a result of suburban development and growth. The re-routed sections include culverts and the straightening of the route. A notable section which has been altered is the section underneath Rath Park; this section flows through a storm drain.

The creek becomes a tidal creek near the dam at Doxey Brook's southern end; this is near Mott Creek's widest point, which is nearly 600 feet (180 m) in total width. From there, Motts Creek continues towards the southwest to Jamaica Bay.

== USGS monitoring station ==
The United States Geological Survey operates a water monitoring station along Motts Creek. The monitoring station, located off of Rosedale Road, has a monitoring station ID of 01311200.

== See also ==
- Mill River – Another north-south river on Long Island, located slightly to the east, flowing into Hewlett Bay from West Hempstead.
