= History of current bus routes in Queens =

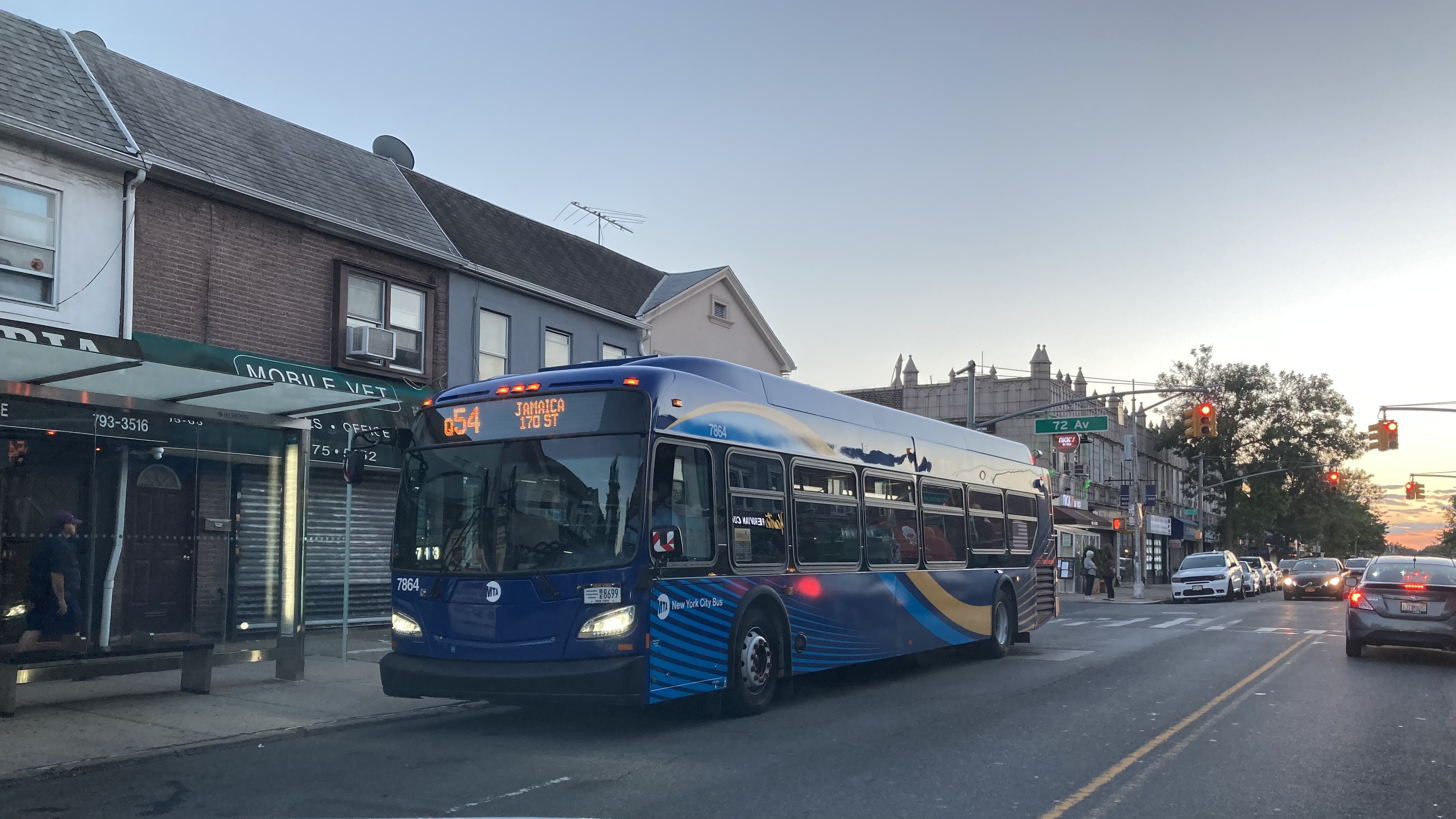
A New Flyer XD40 bus on the Jamaica-bound Q54 at Metropolitan/72nd Avenues in Forest Hills

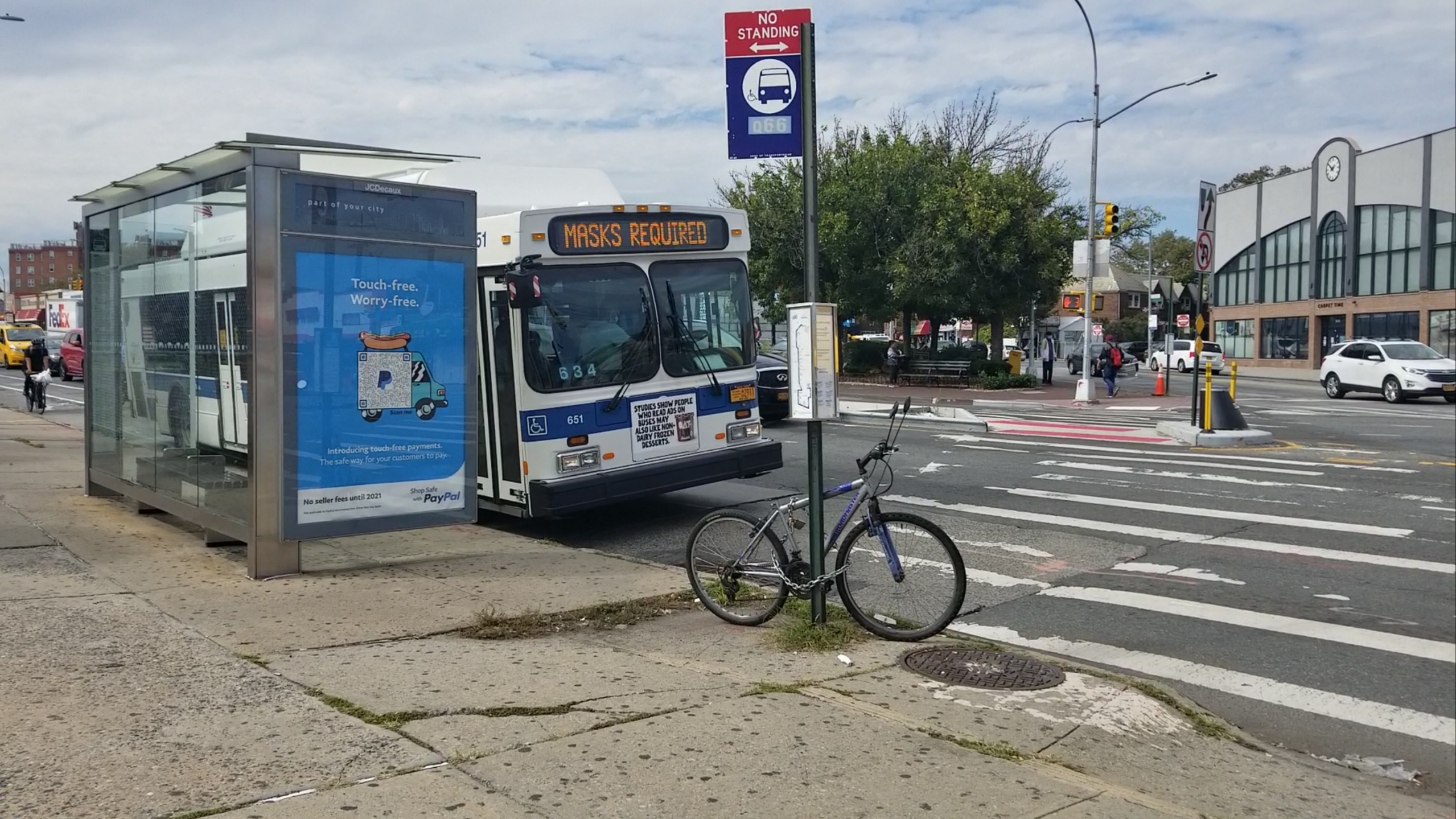
A New Flyer C40LF bus on the Q66 at an old-style bus stop with Guide-A-Ride in Woodside, Queens

The Metropolitan Transportation Authority (MTA) operates a number of bus routes in Queens, New York, United States, under two different public brands. New York City Transit Authority and MTA Regional Bus Operations. Some of them are the direct descendants of streetcar lines (see list of streetcar lines in Queens).

== History of current routes ==
Most of these routes were modified in 2025 as part of the Queens bus redesign. This resulted in the elimination of the Q21, Q34, and old Q48 routes, as well as the elimination of the Q15A, Q20A, and Q20B variants of the existing Q15 and Q20 routes.

=== Routes Q1 to Q46 ===
Route	History
Q1	Originally operated by Hillside Transportation Company, and first operated in 1914.; Later operated by Nevin-Queens Bus Corporation until February 17, 1935, North Shore Bus Company until November 1936, Z & M Coach Company until June 1939, and North Shore Bus Company again until city takeover in 1947.; On April 20, 1975, as a budget cut, the route's two branches, one to Bellerose via Braddock Avenue, and one to Jamaica Avenue in Queens Village via Springfield Boulevard, were consolidated between 1:15 a.m. and 5 a.m., with service looping east on Hillside Avenue, down Braddock Avenue to Jamaica Avenue, on Jamaica Avenue to Springfield Boulevard, and then on Springfield Boulevard back to Hillside Avenue.; Extended to Jamaica LIRR Station on June 29, 2025 as part of the Queens Bus Redesign. Q82 took over service to/from Jamaica Bus Terminal.; Springfield Boulevard and Jamaica Avenue service was discontinued on June 29, 2025 as part of the Queens Bus Redesign; replaced by the Q36.
Q2	Originally operated by St. Albans Imp. in 1919 as DP&S Route 76.; The route was later operated by Bee Line Bus Company and North Shore Bus Company.; Starting on May 2, 2007, during racing days, the Q2 began to stop inside the racetrack.; Service to UBS Arena/Belmont Park became full time upon the opening of the arena on January 2, 2022.; Limited-Stop Rush service on Hillside Avenue began on June 29, 2025 due to the Queens Bus Redesign.
Q3	Originally operated by St. Albans Imp. in 1919 as DP&S Route 76.; Later operated by Bee Line Bus Company and North Shore Bus Company.; Extended from Rockaway Boulevard to JFK International Airport in December 1987.; 24-hour service was added on April 11, 2004. At the same time, service to all JFK terminals except Terminal 4 was replaced by AirTrain JFK.; JFK Terminus moved to Terminal 5 on May 30, 2012, due to construction at Terminal 4.; JFK Terminus moved from Terminal 5 to Lefferts Blvd Airtrain Station and rerouted to serve Terminal 8 on March 27, 2022.
Q4	Originally operated by St. Albans Imp. in 1919 as DP&S Route 72. Later operated by Bee Line Bus Company and North Shore Bus Company.; Original western terminus was the 169th Street subway station. Service rerouted to Jamaica Center on December 11, 1988.; On August 29, 1993, two-way traffic on Archer Avenue and Jamaica Avenue was restored between 138th Street and 168th Street, undoing changes that took effect in November 1990. The change was made to alleviate heavy traffic on Jamaica Avenue. Q4 service began running on Archer Avenue in both directions. Outbound trips were rerouted to run east on Archer Avenue from Parsons Boulevard to Merrick Boulevard instead of via Jamaica Avenue.; On January 12, 2004, morning reverse peak limited-stop service was added, and Jamaica-bound limited-stop service in the a.m. rush hour was rerouted to Liberty Avenue and 160th Street from 168th Street and Archer Avenue to match the travel path during the p.m. rush hour.; Fare-free service for six to 12 months started on September 24, 2023.; Q4 Limited service discontinued on June 27, 2025 due to the Queens Bus Redesign.; Limited-Stop Rush service on Merrick Boulevard began on June 29, 2025 due to the Queens Bus Redesign.
Q5	Originally operated by Orange Line in 1921, then by Bee Line Bus Company in 1922 as DP&S Route 77, and then by North Shore Bus Company starting in 1939.; The original terminals of the route were 163rd Street and Jamaica Avenue and Francis Lewis Boulevard and North Conduit Avenue (Rosedale LIRR Station).; The route's northern terminal was changed to 168th Street and Hillside Avenue on October 27, 1939.; Extended to Green Acres Mall on November 15, 1987.; Service was rerouted to Jamaica Center on December 11, 1988.; On August 29, 1993, two-way traffic on Archer Avenue and Jamaica Avenue was restored between 138th Street and 168th Street, undoing changes that took effect in November 1990. The change was made to alleviate heavy traffic on Jamaica Avenue. Q5 service began running on Archer Avenue in both directions. Outbound Q5 trips were rerouted to run east on Archer Avenue from Parsons Boulevard to Merrick Boulevard instead of via Jamaica Avenue.; On January 12, 2004, Jamaica-bound limited-stop service in the a.m. rush hour was rerouted to Liberty Avenue and 160th Street from 168th Street and Archer Avenue to match the travel path during the p.m. rush hour.; Q5 Limited service discontinued on June 27, 2025 due to the Queens Bus Redesign.; Q5 Weekday service was shortened to Laurelton, and weekday service to Rosedale LIRR and Green Acres Mall discontinued on June 29, 2025 due to the Queens Bus Redesign. Services were replaced by the Q86 and Q87.
Q6	Originally operated by Queens Bus Corporation, it first operated on July 19, 1922.; Formerly operated by Green Bus Lines.; Northern terminal moved to Jamaica Union Bus Terminal (Jamaica Avenue and Brewer Boulevard) on August 16, 1936.; By 1975, Jamaica terminals were Sutphin Boulevard and Hillside Avenue, and 165th Street and Archer Avenue.; Extended to 165th Street Terminal on October 30, 1989.; Limited-stop service added on April 19, 2010.; Limited-stop service was discontinued on August 29, 2025 due to the Queens Bus Network Redesign.
Q7	Originally operated by the Ruoff Brothers, it started service on October 5, 1921, as DP&S Route 66.; Formerly operated by Green Bus Lines.; On August 31, 2025, service to East New York Euclid Avenue Station was discontinued and replaced by the Q112 from Cross Bay Boulevard to Euclid Avenue, service to the JFK Cargo Area was shortened to the Travel Plaza, service was rerouted along Rockaway Boulevard up to the 75th Street-Elderts Lane subway station in Cypress Hills. The route now operates 24 hours a day, all of these changes took place by the Queens Bus Network Redesign.
Q8	Service started on April 15, 1933.; Formerly operated by Green Bus Lines.; Northern terminal moved to Jamaica Union Bus Terminal (Jamaica Avenue and Brewer Boulevard) on August 16, 1936.; By 1975, Jamaica terminus was 165th Street and Archer Avenue.; The route was extended to the 165th Street Terminal on October 30, 1989.; Extended from City Line at Euclid Avenue to Spring Creek at Gateway Drive and Erskine Street on June 29, 2008.; On December 7, 2008, eastbound buses were rerouted to travel via Logan Street instead of via Montauk Avenue between Sutter Avenue and Pitkin Avenue to provide faster service.; Extended to new bus terminal at Gateway Center North on August 31, 2014.
Q9	Originally operated by Billow Bus Line, it started service on May 1, 1920, as DP&S Route 55.; By 1975, Jamaica terminus was 165th Street and Archer Avenue.; Extended to 165th Street Terminal on October 30, 1989.; Formerly operated by Green Bus Lines.; On August 31, 2025, Rush service was introduced as part of the Queens Bus Network Redesign.
Q10	Originally operated by Richmond Hill Bus, service began on April 29, 1929, as DP&S Route 53.; Formerly operated by Green Bus Lines.; JFK Terminus moved to Terminal 5 on May 30, 2012, due to construction at Terminal 4.; Between 1989 and 2011, trips to/from JFK Airport alternated between 130th Street/150th Avenue and Lefferts Boulevard/Rockaway Boulevard via either Rockaway Boulevard or Conduit Avenue. The Conduit Avenue branch was replaced by Q10 limited-stop service.; Weekday and Saturday limited-stop service introduced on September 3, 2006.; Sunday limited-stop service was added on April 6, 2008.; Lefferts Boulevard Branch became all-limited on April 28, 2013.; Articulated buses debuted on May 4, 2013.; All Q10 service was cut back to Lefferts Blvd Airtrain Station on March 27, 2022, with service within JFK replaced by the Q3 and JFK Airtrain.; Limited service cut on August 31, 2025 due to the Queens Bus Redesign. Became a Rush Route. Service on Lefferts Blvd south of Rockaway Blvd taken over by the Q80.
Q11	Originally operated by Liberty Bus, service was started in 1918, as DP&S Route 64.; Liberty Bus received the route's franchise on January 30, 1933.; Formerly operated by Green Bus Lines.; Had two part-time services as late as June 1996: A one-way service that ran from Cross Bay Boulevard and 165th Avenue, and another service that ran to 102nd Street and 157th Avenue.; Overnight service to Old Howard Beach and Hamilton Beach was eliminated on September 12, 2010.; Service to Hamilton Beach after 10:00 p.m. was eliminated on July 1, 2012.; Due to the Queens Bus Redesign on August 31, 2025, the Q11 was rerouted via Lindenwood. Service via Pitkin Avenue was eliminated. Also, Old Howard Beach and Hamilton Beach service was combined into a loop in each direction.
Q12	Originally owned by Rauchwerger, service started in 1921, replacing the old New York and North Shore Traction Company North Shore Line streetcar, which was abandoned in 1920.; Formerly operated by North Shore Bus Company.; Articulated buses debuted on September 1, 2019.; Service rerouted from Sanford Avenue to Northern Boulevard on June 29, 2025 due to the Queens Bus Redesign.
Q13	Originally owned by Rauchwerger, service started on March 14, 1920, under supervision of the Department of Plant and Structure as DP&S Route 18. Service replaced streetcar service from the New York and North Shore Traction Company, which had been discontinued three weeks prior. Service operated every 7 minutes between 6 a.m. and 1 a.m.. Eight buses were used to operate the route.; On September 1, 1925, the Bayside line was extended from Crocheron Avenue and Bell Boulevard to Shore Road. The extension was served by at least one trip per hour. The service was implemented at the request of a Bayside civic worker who had brought the issue to Queens Borough President Connolly.; Later operated by North Shore Bus Company.; On April 13, 1960, the Little Bay Civic Association reported that the NYCTA turned down a proposal by that group and others to extend the route to Willets Point Boulevard and Utopia Parkway from its existing terminal at Fort Totten. The NYCTA declined to extend the route based on the findings of a study made in 1958, and since the extension would duplicate existing service.; On July 11, 1966, the NYCTA moved the terminals of the Q13, Q14, Q16, Q28, and Q44FS from downtown Flushing to the Flushing Parking Field surrounded by 37th Avenue, Union Street, 138th Street, and 39th Avenue on a six-month pilot basis. The change, which was made at the request of multiple Queens elected officials, was intended to provide shelter for riders and reduce downtown congestion. However, due to immediate opposition from shoppers, who complained that the change forced them to walk four blocks to get from the subway to the buses, businessmen, and elected officials, on July 20, 1966, the NYCTA announced that it would undo the change on July 24. Q13, Q16, and Q28 service would go back to terminating on the north side of Roosevelt Avenue to the east of Main Street, while Q14 and Q44FS service would resume terminating on the east side of Main Street at 39th Avenue.; Service rerouted from Northern Boulevard to Sanford Avenue on June 29, 2025 due to the Queens Bus Redesign.; Limited-Stop Rush service on Northern Boulevard and Sanford Avenue began on June 29, 2025 due to the Queens Bus Redesign.
Q14	Service started on June 29, 2025 as part of the Queens Bus Redesign; took over the 102nd and 103rd Street portion of the Q23 and the northern part of the Q38.
Q15	Originally owned by Rauchwerger, Q14 service began on August 2, 1920, as DP&S Route 54.; Originally owned by Rauchwerger, Q15 service began on April 3, 1924.; Later operated by North Shore Bus Company.; On November 29, 1956, the NYCTA approved a series of changes to citywide bus service to take effect January 22, 1957. One of the planned changes was the institution of late night service on the Q15, providing joint service along the two branches to Whitestone and Beechhurst.; Overnight service was eliminated on September 10, 1995, due to a budget crisis.; On June 27, 2002, Beechhurst-bound Q15 buses were rerouted to the Cross Island Parkway Service Road from 15th Drive to speed up service.; Q15A replaced Q14 service on June 27, 2010 due to another budget crisis.; Q15A service and Q15 service on 154th Street discontinued on June 29, 2025 due to the Queens Bus Redesign, service replaced by a rerouted Q15 and Q61, respectively.
Q16	Originally owned by North Shore Bus Company, service began on August 15, 1930.; Utopia Parkway service began on October 30, 1952 to serve the Clearview Gardens development.; On November 29, 1956, the NYCTA approved a series of changes to citywide bus service to take effect January 22, 1957. One of the planned changes was the consolidation of the main route via Willets Point Boulevard and Clintonville Avenue and the spur route along Utopia Parkway branches, onto 166th Street. Buses had previously alternated between running via Utopia Parkway and Francis Lewis Boulevard and Whitestone Parkway. The planned change was opposed by the North Queens Community Coordinating Council.; Service along the Utopia Parkway spur had run along Utopia Parkway from 16th Avenue to 26th Avenue. The main route had run along 26th Avenue, Clintonville Street and Willets Point Boulevard to 160th Street. Instead, service ran along 166th Street between 26th Avenue and Willets Point Boulevard. This change took effect on February 3, 1957. 166 trips were dropped from the Q16 schedule. In response to the proposed change in the route, mothers from Clearview Gardens threatened to form a human barricade across 166th Street. They opposed the change due to safety concerns; service was to be rerouted from the wider Clintonville Street and Utopia Parkway to the narrow 166th Street, along which two schools were located. The original routes were restored on November 17, 1957.; On July 11, 1966, the NYCTA moved the terminals of the Q13, Q14, Q16, Q28, and Q44FS from downtown Flushing to the Flushing Parking Field surrounded by 37th Avenue, Union Street, 138th Street, and 39th Avenue on a six-month pilot basis. The change, which was made at the request of multiple Queens elected officials, was intended to provide shelter for riders and reduce downtown congestion. However, due to immediate opposition from shoppers, who complained that the change forced them to walk four blocks to get from the subway to the buses, businessmen, and elected officials, on July 20, 1966, the NYCTA announced that it would undo the change on July 24. Q13, Q16, and Q28 service would go back to terminating on the north side of Roosevelt Avenue to the east of Main Street, while Q14 and Q44FS service would resume terminating on the east side of Main Street at 39th Avenue.; Overnight service was eliminated on September 10, 1995, as part of a series of cuts made to reduce the MTA's budget deficit.; Francis Lewis Boulevard branch discontinued on June 29, 2025 due to the Queens Bus Redesign. Service replaced by the Q61.
Q17	Originally owned by Flushing Heights Bus Company, service began in 1928.; On November 29, 1956, the NYCTA approved a slate of changes in city bus service to take effect January 22, 1957. One of the planned changes was the elimination of Q17-20 service between Flushing and College Point to eliminate competition with the Q25 route of Queens-Nassau Transit lines. Service was replaced by three routes: the new Q44FS between Flushing and College Point, the new Q17 Flushing-188th Street line, and the existing Q17A Little Neck-169th Street line. Free transfers were instituted between the routes. Service west of 122nd Street and 14th Avenue in College Point was discontinued. The 598 daily trips on the Q17-20 were decreased by 44 among the Q17, Q44FS, and Q17A. Service during late nights, which had run as a shuttle between Flushing and College Point, was discontinued between 12:30 a.m. and 5 a.m.. Q17 service began running from Flushing-Main Street to Fresh Meadow Lane and the Horace Harding Expressway. These changes took effect on February 3, 1957.; Extended to Archer Avenue and Merrick Boulevard on December 11, 1988.; On August 29, 1993, two-way traffic on Archer Avenue and Jamaica Avenue was restored. The first stop on the Q17 was moved from 165th Street between Archer Avenue and Jamaica Avenue to Merrick Boulevard between those two avenues.; Limited-stop service began on September 8, 2003.; The northern terminal was shifted from Main Street and 39th Avenue to 39th Avenue and 138th Street on August 31, 2014.; The Q17 bus stop at Main Street and Roosevelt Avenue (towards Jamaica) was discontinued in August 2023 and a new stop was added at Main Street and 38th Avenue. This was due to construction at the Main Street subway station. This later became permanent because of the DOT's Better Buses Action Plan.; Q17 Limited service discontinued on June 27, 2025 due to the Queens Bus Redesign.; On September 4, 2026, Jamaica-bound Q17 and Q65 bus stops swapped in Flushing. Jamaica-bound Q17 now makes its first stop at Main Street and Roosevelt Avenue.
Q18	Originally owned by Woodside–Astoria Transportation, service began in 1925.; On June 30, 2003, to better serve Goodwill Industries, service was rerouted between to run along 30th Avenue between 14th Street and 8th Street, and along 8th Street between 30th Avenue and 27th Avenue. The route along 14th Street between 30th Avenue and 27th Avenue, and along 27th Avenue between 14th Street and 8th Street was discontinued.; Formerly operated by Triboro Coach Corporation.
Q19	Eastern part of route between Corona and Flushing was begun by Salvatore Fornatora during April 1919, and the existing Q19 bus route was essentially created and extended in phases over the following years.; Service extended westwardly to Ditmars Boulevard and 31st Street in the mid-1920s via Ditmars Boulevard. Later extended to Hallets Cove ferry slip, then cut back to 21st Street.; Service moved off Ditmars Boulevard and to Astoria Boulevard after completion of Triborough Bridge in 1936.; Formerly operated by Triboro Coach Corporation.; Re-extended from 102nd Street in East Elmhurst to Flushing in January 2007, resembling Salvatore Fornatora's original bus route.; The route was extended from Astoria Boulevard and 21st Street to 27th Avenue and 2nd Street on June 29, 2014.
Q20	North Shore Bus Company began operating the Q20 on February 15, 1932.; On November 29, 1956, the NYCTA approved a slate of changes in city bus service to take effect January 22, 1957. One of the planned changes was the elimination of Q17-20 service between Flushing and College Point due to competition from routes of the Queens-Nassau Transit lines. Service was replaced by three routes: the new Q44FS between Flushing and College Point, the new Q17 Flushing-188th Street line, and the existing Q17A Little Neck-169th Street line. Free transfers were instituted between the routes. Service west of 122nd Street and 14th Avenue in College Point was discontinued. The 598 daily trips on the Q17-20 were decreased by 44 among the Q17, Q44FS, and Q17A. Service on the Q44FS ran every 15 minutes from 6 a.m. to 9 a.m. toward Flushing, and every 15 minutes from 3:45 p.m. to 7:30 p.m. toward College Point, with service every 30 minutes during the rest of the day. Service during late nights, which had run as a shuttle between Flushing and College Point, was discontinued between 12:30 a.m. and 5 a.m.. These changes took effect on February 3, 1957.; On July 11, 1966, the NYCTA moved the terminals of the Q13, Q14, Q16, Q28, and Q44FS from downtown Flushing to the Flushing Parking Field surrounded by 37th Avenue, Union Street, 138th Street, and 39th Avenue on a six-month pilot basis. The change, which was made at the request of multiple Queens elected officials, was intended to provide shelter for riders and reduce downtown congestion. However, due to immediate opposition from shoppers, who complained that the change forced them to walk four blocks to get from the subway to the buses, businessmen, and elected officials, on July 20, 1966, the NYCTA announced that it would undo the change on July 24. Q13, Q16, and Q28 service would go back to terminating on the north side of Roosevelt Avenue to the east of Main Street, while Q14 and Q44FS service would resume terminating on the east side of Main Street at 39th Avenue.; Renumbered back to Q20 on April 15, 1990. 20th Avenue service began at that time.; Weekend service eliminated on September 10, 1995, due to budget crisis.; Extended to Jamaica from Flushing on June 27, 1999, when Q44 became limited-stop; route in College Point was split into Q20A and Q20B at same time. Weekend service restored on Q20A.; Q20A overnight service began November 29, 2015, replacing Q44 local service.; Q20A variant was renamed to the Q20 on June 29, 2025.; Q20B variant discontinued on June 27, 2025 due to the Queens Bus Redesign. Service on 14th Avenue replaced by the Q76.; Service also rerouted from Hillside Avenue and Sutphin Boulevard to Jamaica Avenue on June 29, 2025 due to the Queens Bus Redesign.
Q22	Originally owned by Long Island Coach Company, service began in 1912.; Formerly operated by Green Bus Lines.; Extended to Far Rockaway LIRR, with 2 trips to Bayswater. Service between Roxbury and Rockaway Park cut on August 31, 2025 due to the Queens Bus Redesign.
Q23	Service began in 1925, being operated by North Shore Bus Company.; On April 19, 1977, the New York City City Planning Commission approved plans to extend the route west on Metropolitan Avenue, south on Woodhaven Boulevard, east on Union Turnpike and north on 71st Avenue. The extension was intended to serve the 740 residents of the Forest Park Cooperative on Union Turnpike.; Formerly operated by Triboro Coach Corporation.; Service straightened along 108th Street on June 29, 2025 due to the Queens Bus Redesign. Service on 102nd and 103rd Streets were replaced by the Q14.
Q24	On January 15, 1950, the Broadway streetcar line was discontinued and replaced by an extension of the B22 Atlantic Avenue bus from Van Sinderen Avenue to Broadway and Gates Avenue, where transfers would be available to streetcar lines to Williamsburgh Bridge Plaza.; Formerly B22; renumbered and extended from 89th Avenue and Parsons Boulevard to 170th Street and Jamaica Avenue on December 11, 1988.; On August 29, 1993, two-way traffic on Archer Avenue and Jamaica Avenue was restored between 138th Street and 168th Street, undoing changes that took effect in November 1990. The change was made to alleviate heavy traffic on Jamaica Avenue. Q24 service began running on Jamaica Avenue in both directions. Eastbound buses were rerouted from Archer Avenue onto Jamaica Avenue.; On January 25, 1998, the eastern terminal was moved from 168th Street between Archer Avenue and Jamaica Avenue to Archer Avenue between 168th Street and Merrick Boulevard due to heavy traffic on 168th Street.; Service west of Broadway Junction was discontinued on June 27, 2010, and restored on January 6, 2013.; Service rerouted from 168th Street to Parsons Blvd and 88th Avenue on August 31, 2025 due to the Queens Bus Redesign.
Q25	Originally owned by Flushing Heights Bus Company, service began in 1928.; Formerly operated by Queens-Nassau Transit Lines, Queens Transit Corporation, and Queens Surface Corporation.; The original Q25 terminus was in Flushing; it was combined with the then-Q34 route into College Point.; Southern terminus moved from 160th Street and Jamaica Avenue to Parsons Boulevard and Jamaica Avenue in 2005.; Extended to Jamaica LIRR station on Sutphin Boulevard in April 2006.; Limited-stop service was introduced on July 9, 2007.; Q25 Limited service discontinued on June 27, 2025 due to the Queens Bus Redesign.
Q26	Originally owned by Z & M Coach Company, service began on October 1, 1931; later operated by North Shore Bus Company from 1934 until March 1947.; Originally operated from 47th Avenue and Hollis Court Boulevard, along Hollis Court Boulevard, which used to run through Cunningham Park, 212th Street (now part of the Clearview Expressway), and Jamaica Avenue (along the current Q36 route) to 257th Street. Later extended to Flushing.; Service south of Horace Harding Expressway to Jamaica Avenue at the Queens Village LIRR station became rush hours only during World War II. Service past Queens Village was discontinued on November 26, 1941.; On November 29, 1956, the NYCTA approved plans to cut the route back from Queens Village to the Horace Harding Expressway, and to redesignate the route from the Q26 Flushing-Queens Village route to the Q26 Flushing-46th Avenue route. Though the change was initially scheduled to take effect on January 22, 1957, it took effect on February 3, 1957.; Weekend and overnight service was discontinued on September 10, 1995, due to a budget crisis.; Off-peak service was discontinued on June 27, 2010, due to another budget crisis.; Service was extended to College Point, as well off-peak and weekend service being restored on June 29, 2025 due to the Queens Bus Redesign.; Transferred from NYCT to MTA Bus Company on June 29, 2025 due to the Queens Bus Redesign.
Q27	Originally operated by Z & M Coach Company, service began in 1926.; Originally operated between Flushing and the Horace Harding Expressway.; Alternate buses were extended south along Springfield Boulevard to Queens Village LIRR station on April 30, 1950. This change had been approved by the New York City Board of Estimate on April 4.; On January 22, 1957, service was extended on a 90-day trial basis by 2 miles (3.2 km) from the Queens Village LIRR station to the intersection of Springfield Boulevard and Merrick Boulevard, as part of a series of bus changes citywide. The change was approved by the NYCTA on November 29, 1956.; On June 30, 1957, service was extended on a 60-day trial basis by 1.5 miles (2.4 km) from Springfield Boulevard and Merrick Boulevard to Merrick Boulevard and 233rd Street. The extension was made to encourage more people to use the bus route. Ridership on the temporary extension to Springfield Boulevard and Merrick Boulevard was low, with revenues averaging 23 cents per mile, lower than the 80 cents per mile needed to break even. On August 26, 1957, the NYCTA announced that service would resume terminating at Springfield Boulevard an Merrick Boulevard on September 8, since it was losing $120 a day on the extension to 233rd Street.; For a few months in 1957, service was extended to 136th Avenue.; On September 26, 1982, wheelchair-accessible buses began operating on the Q27 and 17 other city bus routes.; Between 1980 and 1985, buses were rerouted off of Parsons Boulevard between 46th Avenue and Kissena Boulevard, the path it shared with the Q26, onto Holly Avenue and Kissena Boulevard.; Peak-direction limited-stop service was introduced in September 2001.; Service to Queensborough Community College began on September 9, 2002.; Extended to 120th Avenue and Springfield Boulevard in Cambria Heights from Queens Village on January 4, 2004 to replace Q83 service on Springfield Boulevard between Murdock Avenue and Queens Village LIRR station.; Overnight trips were extended from Queens Village to Cambria Heights on January 6, 2013.; The northern terminal was shifted from Main Street and 39th Avenue to 39th Avenue and 138th Street in August 2014.; On June 30, 2024, Flushing-bound Q27 buses were shifted to start at 121st Avenue and Springfield Boulevard.; Q27 Limited service was replaced by Rush service on Parsons Boulevard and 46th Avenue which began on June 29, 2025 due to the Queens Bus Redesign.
Q28	Originally operated by North Shore Bus Company in April 1928.; On May 22, 1933, North Shore Bus Company officials said that buses used State Street instead of the route specified in the franchise on Crocheron Avenue between Northern Boulevard and 164th Street due to the poor condition of the roadway. Queens Borough President George U. Harvey had asked Police Commissioner James Bolan to stop the buses from using State Street to the west of 164th Street.; On June 6, 1933, it was announced that the route would be revised on June 10, 1933, to go off of State Street between 164th Street and Whitestone Avenue, and instead run along 164th Street, Crocheron Avenue, and Northern Boulevard in accordance with franchise requirements for the route laid out by Queens Borough President George U. Harvey. North Shore, right after being awarded the franchise for the route, submitted an application to modify the service to continue operating along the more direct State Street route. A hearing on the application would be held by the Board of Estimate's Committee of the Whole on June 13. North Shore President Joseph Rauschwerger did not want the route to be shifted to Northern Boulevard as adding the route, which operated every four minutes, to Northern Boulevard, which saw buses every two minutes, would increase congestion. With the June 10 change, service would run from 32nd Avenue and 201st Street in Bayside West, along 32nd Avenue, Cross Island Boulevard (later renamed as Francis Lewis Boulevard), State Street (later renamed 35th Avenue), 164th Street, Crocheron Avenue, Northern Boulevard, and Main Street to the Central Terminal Building on Roosevelt Avenue. Ridership on the route was 1.9 million in 1932.; On June 13, the Board postponed action on the request for a week after Mayor O'Brien suggested that the views of residents along State Street should be obtained first. At the meeting, a petition from residents of 164th Street was submitted in favor of the North Shore's application. The North Shore had previously been operating along State Street under a temporary permit from the city. At the meeting, Harvey said he was opposed to the proposed change and that he would ask the police department for permission the route to use 162nd Street instead of 164th Street. At a later meeting of the board on June 20, residents along State Street testified against the restoration of service to State Street. Following that meeting, it was reported that the engineer in charge of the Division of Franchises and the chief engineer of the Board of Estimate were studying the potential rerouting of the route along a street other than Northern Boulevard or State Street. On June 27, 1933, the Division of Franchises issued a report recommending that the Board of Estimate make no changes to the route until the franchise expired in February 1934. It also stated that requests to change the route could be brought up with Borough President Harvey, and that he could request that the Police Department permit service to run along another street to the west of 164th Street. The report said it would make sense to have the bus route run along a better alternative route, potentially straight along Crocheron Avenue.; On July 20, 1942, service was rerouted from 32nd Avenue to 33rd Avenue between Corporal Kennedy Street and Francis Lewis Boulevard.; On December 21, 1961, the Board of Estimate approved an extension of the Q28 requested by the NYCTA. The proposed extension had mixed support from the Bay Terrace co-ops it would serve, with some residents opposing it since they believed having buses travel down the area's narrow streets would lead to the implementation of parking restrictions and one-way traffic, and would risk the lives of children, while some residents supported it for shortening their walks to the bus. On February 18, 1962, the route was extended from Corporal Kennedy Street and 32nd Avenue to Corporal Kennedy Street and 18th Avenue during a six-month test period to provide bus service to new co-ops. Northbound service would be extended north along Corporal Kennedy Street to 18th Avenue. Southbound service would run along 18th Street to 211th Street, 211th Street to 23rd Avenue, and along 23rd Avenue to return to Corporal Kennedy Street, Service would run every 14 minutes in the morning rush hour, 16 minutes during the evening rush hour, and every 20 minutes other times. This extension was made permanent after the test period.; On July 11, 1966, the NYCTA moved the terminals of the Q13, Q14, Q16, Q28, and Q44FS from downtown Flushing to the Flushing Parking Field surrounded by 37th Avenue, Union Street, 138th Street, and 39th Avenue on a six-month pilot basis. The change, which was made at the request of multiple Queens elected officials, was intended to provide shelter for riders and reduce downtown congestion. However, due to immediate opposition from shoppers, who complained that the change forced them to walk four blocks to get from the subway to the buses, businessmen, and elected officials, on July 20, 1966, the NYCTA announced that it would undo the change on July 24. Q13, Q16, and Q28 service would go back to terminating on the north side of Roosevelt Avenue to the east of Main Street, while Q14 and Q44FS service would resume terminating on the east side of Main Street at 39th Avenue.; On September 12, 1983, weekday service between 10 a.m. to 4 p.m. was extended from 211th Street to the Bay Terrace Shopping Center at 213th Place, running along 23rd Avenue.; On July 15, 1988, the MTA Board approved the expansion of the span of service to the Bay Terrace Shopping Center from weekdays between 9:30 a.m. and 3:30 p.m. to all times the route operated. Previously, service outside those hours had terminated at 23rd Avenue and 211th Street other times.; The change was implemented as part of a phased elimination of multi-special school bus service not available to the general public prompted by new federal funding requirements. With the changes in Q28 service, special trips operating over the Q13 and Q28 to Intermediate School 25 and Bayside High School service would be eliminated in September 1988. The extended service would permit transfers to the Q13 route. In addition, westbound service to the shopping center would be rerouted to operate along 18th Avenue and 211th Street between 23rd Avenue and Corporal Kennedy Street, matching the route used by eastbound service. The changes took effect on September 11, 1988.; On September 11, 1989, service was modified to have trips start at Bell Boulevard and 23rd Avenue instead of at the Bay Terrace Shopping Center.; Limited-Stop Rush service on Northern Boulevard began on June 29, 2025 due to the Queens Bus Redesign.; Transferred from NYCT to MTA Bus Company on June 29, 2025 because of the Queens Bus Redesign.
Q29	Service began in 1921.; Formerly operated by Kings Coach Company, and then by Triboro Coach Corporation.; Route transferred from MTA Bus Company to NYCT on June 29, 2025.
Q30	Q17A service began as a New York City Transit route on September 7, 1947, running between Jamaica Avenue and 169th Street to Horace Harding Boulevard and Springfield Boulevard. Service began at 6 a.m.; The route was then extended along Horace Harding Boulevard between Springfield Boulevard and Little Neck Parkway at the Nassau County Line on August 21, 1949.; The Q17A was renumbered to Q30 and extended from Jamaica Avenue-169th Street to Jamaica LIRR station via Archer Avenue on December 11, 1988.; On August 29, 1993, two-way traffic on Archer Avenue and Jamaica Avenue was restored between 138th Street and 168th Street, undoing changes that took effect in November 1990. The change was made to alleviate heavy traffic on Jamaica Avenue. Q30 service began running on Archer Avenue in both directions; eastbound buses had been running along Jamaica Avenue between Parsons Boulevard and 168th Street.; Short run trips terminating at Horace Harding Expressway and Springfield Boulevard converted into branch to Queensborough Community College on January 7, 2013.; Limited-Stop Rush service on Utopia Parkway began on June 29, 2025 due to the Queens Bus Redesign.; Queensborough Community College branch was renamed to the Q75 on June 30, 2025 due to the Queens Bus Redesign.
Q31	Service began in 1932 on the Q31, Jamaica-Bayside West route, by the Bayside Community Bus Corporation. On December 2, 1932, the New York City Board of Estimate had received an application to operate the route from S & C Bus Company. Its application would have the route operate with a five-cent fare instead of the existing two zones of five cents, with the zone split being at Kissena Park. A review of the application would take place on December 9. With S&C's application, the petition of Bayside Community Bus was put off to be done along with the application of S&C. Acting Borough President John J. Halleran opposed this move as he believed that Bayside, being the existing operator, should get the franchise. Halleran did not support the five-cent fare as he did not believe good service could be provided at that fare level.; The Board of Estimate denied Bayside's application to get a one-year franchise for the route on January 23, 1933. Bayside's attorney noted that Controller Charles W. Berry's recommendation to the Board on how Queens bus franchises should be awarded called for the award of franchises to existing operators on a one-year contract to permit the values of franchises to be figured out before final awards for the routes could be awarded.; On February 14, 1933, Justice Henry G. Wenzel Jr. of the Queens Supreme Court denied an application by Bayside Community Bus for an injunction against the S&C from operating buses over the route. Wenzel Jr. ruled that the court could not act on a dispute between two bus operators where neither had official authorization. The attorney representing Bayside argued that the company was entitled to exclusive operation of the route, having operated the route since 1930, while S&C began running service over the same route in October 1932.; On February 17, 1933, the New York City Board of Estimate provided its final approval to award a one-year franchise to operate the route to S & C Buses with its approval of the form of contract, over the opposition of Queens Borough President Harvey. The company was incorporated on November 17, 1932. The Bayside Community Bus Corporation had petitioned for an additional one-year franchise for the route, and had requested a ten-cent fare for it. The counsel for the Bayside Community Bus Corporation had stated that it had lost money on the route on a ten-cent fare for the previous two years. The attorney for the company had stated that every other existing operator of buses in Queens got one-year franchises from the Board. S&C's attorney had stated that the Bayside company had not been operating the route for four months and had no buses. S & C began operating the S&C's route on February 19, 1933. Service operated every 20 minutes, and would operate every 10 minutes once the company received additional buses.; In September 1933, Flushing Heights Bus Corporation applied to the Board of Estimate for permission for the S&C to transfer the franchise for the route to it. On November 17, 1933, the request was denied by the Board of Estimate at the request of Acting Queens Borough President John J. Halleran. He believed the line was unprofitable at its five-cent fare and that the route would end up being abandoned. A Flushing Heights representative stated that the company believed that cost reductions could be obtained and that the route could be operated profitably if it were transferred.; Service was discontinued by S&C on September 7, 1935. On September 11, 1935, attorneys for the Bayside Bus Company were told that Mayor LaGuardia was opposed to granting a franchise to any route with fares over five cents. The company had applied to restore service on the route with two fare zones. Officials at the Department of Plant and Structures told the company that it could get a franchise for the route within a day if it agreed to run the route with a five-cent fare.; On November 30, 1935, the North Shore Civic Alliance sent a letter to the Department of Plants and Structures requesting that it implement an emergency bus service to replace the discontinued Q31, which had run between Jamaica station and Bayside West.; On November 9, 1936, the North Shore Bus Company restarted service on the route as part of its new franchise for all bus routes in Zone B (Flushing and Northern Queens), except those operated by the New York and Queens Transit Corporation. Bayside business owners and residents had requested the restoration of this route. Service would operated from Horace Harding Boulevard and Fresh Meadow Road to 32nd Avenue and 201st Street. Buses would operate along Fresh Meadow Lane, Auburndale Lane, 46th Avenue, Hollis Court Boulevard, 47th Avenue, Rocky Hill Road, 48th Avenue, Bell Boulevard, 35th Avenue, 208th Street, 33rd Avenue, and 201st Street. Weekday service operated every 12 to 16 minutes during rush hours, and every 20 minutes during other times. Service operated between about 6 a.m. to 1 a.m.. Transfers were provided at Horace Harding Boulevard to other North Shore routes to Jamaica and other destinations.; In February 1950, the Flushing Heights, Queens, Civic Association requested that the New York City Board of Transportation modify the southern terminal loop of the Q31, arguing that its existing route, which ran along a street with P.S. 173, endangered the lives of children and other people. The Q31's terminal loop had run via Fresh Meadow Lane, 67th Avenue, 173rd Street, and 65th Avenue. The group endorsed a proposal by the Horace Harding Civic Association to move the terminal loop a full block away from 67th Avenue.; On November 29, 1956, the NYCTA approved a large number of changes to city bus service to take effect January 22, 1957. As part of the changes, the former Q31 and Q31A routes were consolidated into the new Q31. The Q31A had run from 32nd Avenue and 201st Street to the Queens Village LIRR station. The changes took effect February 3, 1957.; On June 30, 1963, service was extended from Fresh Meadow Lane and 65th Avenue to Jamaica Avenue and 169th Street. Service was later extended north from 32nd Avenue and 201st Street. This extension was done on a six-month pilot basis. Buses would run via 201st Street, 33rd Avenue, 202nd Street, 32nd Avenue, 208th Street, 35th Avenue, Bell Boulevard, 48th Avenue, Rocky Hill Road, 47th Avenue, Hollis Court Boulevard, Utopia Parkway, Homelawn Street, 169th Street, and Jamaica Avenue. Service ran every 30 minutes on weekdays, operating between 7:02 a.m. and 10:32 p.m. southbound, and between 7:47 a.m. and 11:20 p.m.. Saturday service operated southbound between 11:32 a.m. and 6:02 p.m., and northbound between 12:17 and 6:47 p.m. The extension was approved on a permanent basis in February 1964.; On December 11, 1988, the route was extended on both ends. At the north end, service was extended to 29th Avenue and Francis Lewis Boulevard to allow transfers to the Q76. At the southern end, service was extended from Jamaica Avenue and 169th Street to the Jamaica LIRR station via Archer Avenue. Some trips would start or end at Merrick Boulevard in the morning or early afternoon. On September 16, 1989, service was extended slightly on its northern end to 27th Avenue and Francis Lewis Boulevard.; On August 29, 1993, two-way traffic on Archer Avenue and Jamaica Avenue was restored between 138th Street and 168th Street, undoing changes that took effect in November 1990. The change was made to alleviate heavy traffic on Jamaica Avenue. Q31 service began running on Archer Avenue in both directions; eastbound buses had been running along Jamaica Avenue between Parsons Boulevard and 168th Street.; Weekend service was eliminated on June 27, 2010, but was restored on April 6, 2014.; Service was rerouted along Bell Boulevard to the Bay Terrace Shopping Center on June 29, 2025 due to the Queens Bus Redesign. Service to 27th Avenue and Francis Lewis Boulevard and on 35th Avenue and Corporal Kennedy Street was discontinued. 32nd Avenue service was replaced by the Q28.
Q32	FACCo began operating the 15 on July 9, 1925.; Original southern terminus was Fifth Avenue and 25th Street.; Taken over by Manhattan and Bronx Surface Transit Operating Authority on March 22, 1962.; Became the M32 on July 1, 1974.; Renumbered in the 1980s to the Q32.; Became shared with MABSTOA and NYCT on June 26th, 1994.; In December 2000, the MTA announced plans to extend the span of eastbound service following weekday and Saturday service from 12 a.m. to 1 a.m., and to extend Sunday service from 10 p.m. to 1 a.m. to allow western Queens residents to use the bus to return from evening events in Manhattan. The additional service was estimated to cost $30,000 a year, and was planned to take effect in March 2001.; Became fully NYCT on June 27th, 2010.; Travels between Manhattan and Queens via the Queensboro Bridge.; Transferred from NYCT to MTA Bus Company on June 29, 2025 due to the Queens Bus Redesign.; Service towards Manhattan rerouted to bypass Queens Plaza North and go straight onto the bridge on August 31,2025 due to the Queens Bus Redesign.
Q33	Originally operated by Municipal Motorbus Company, service began on January 1, 1933.; Formerly operated by Triboro Coach Corporation.; Formerly ran to LaGuardia Airport Terminals D, C, and B until September 8, 2013, replaced by the Q70; Rerouted from East Elmhurst to LaGuardia Airport Terminal A on August 31, 2025 due to the Queens Bus Redesign.
Q35	Green Bus Lines began service on July 3, 1937; originally ran non-stop between the Rockaways and Brooklyn College.; Stops at Marine Parkway Bridge, Floyd Bennett Field, and Avenue U (Kings Plaza) added in 1940.; Open-door service in Brooklyn added circa 1976; until then, buses only made drop offs northbound and pickups southbound in Brooklyn north of Kings Plaza.; On February 15, 2009, the last westbound stop was relocated from Flatbush Avenue between Nostrand Avenue and East 31st Street to Avenue H between Nostrand Avenue and Flatbush Avenue to accommodate a changed turnaround path.; Became a Rush route on August 31, 2025 and extended to Rockaway Ferry Terminal. Late nights will still make local stops in Brooklyn.
Q36	Originally operated by Schenck Transportation, which was incorporated on September 11, 1925, service began in April 1926.; Later on, it was operated by North Shore Bus Company, before being taken over by the New York City Transit Authority in 1947.; Between 1980 and 1985, the route's terminal loop was changed so that instead of using 87th Avenue it would use 87th Road.; Limited-stop service introduced on April 7, 2008.; Weekday service added to Little Neck in January 2013 via the old Q79 route, restoring service along Little Neck Parkway.; Q36 Limited service discontinued on June 27, 2025 due to the Queens Bus Redesign.; Service was extended along Hillside Avenue to Springfield Boulevard, and service on 212th Street and 212th Place was discontinued and replaced with the Q82 on June 29, 2025 due to the Queens Bus Redesign.; Limited-Stop Rush service on Hillside Avenue as well as weekend service to Little Neck LIRR began on June 29, 2025 due to the Queens Bus Redesign.
Q37	Originally operated by General Omnibus Company, service began in January 1939.; Formerly operated by Green Bus Lines.; Extended from Jamaica Avenue to Kew Gardens on November 23, 1941.; Between 1980 and 1985, the route's terminal was moved from 130th Street and 150th Avenue to Lincoln Street and 135th Avenue.; Daily service via Aqueduct Racetrack was added in 2012.; Southern terminal moved from 150th and 149th Avenues to 135th Road and 131st Street in 2018.; Service rerouted from 114th Street and 133rd Avenue to Rockaway and Lefferts Boulevards due to the Queens Bus Redesign.
Q38	Originally operated by Affiliated Transit, service began in June 1934.; Formerly operated by Triboro Coach Corporation.; Originally Q38 (Penelope Avenue) and Q45X/Q50 (Eliot Avenue) routes; combined into a single Q38 route on July 3, 1960.; The termini were less than a half mile apart, the closest together for any route in Queens and in the entire city.; Service on the northern half of the route was discontinued on June 29, 2025 due to the Queens Bus Redesign; replaced by the Q14.; Route also transferred from MTA Bus Company to NYCT on June 29, 2025.
Q39	Originally operated by National City Bus Lines, service began on June 16, 1934. On January 31, 1935, the company received the franchise for the route.; Formerly operated by Triboro Coach Corporation.; Overnight service was added in August 2007.; On November 17, 2008, westbound service was rerouted to travel via Jackson Avenue, 45th Avenue and 23rd Street due to the permanent closure of 45th Road between 23rd Street and Jackson Avenue for the construction of a free subway transfer passageway at Court Square.; Service through Court Square was discontinued on June 29, 2025 due to the Queens Bus Redesign. Route was also transferred from MTA Bus Company to NYCT.
Q40	Originally operated by Midland Coach, service began on February 5, 1934.; Formerly operated by Green Bus Lines.; Between 1985 and December 1989, the route's terminal loop was changed so that buses ran via Rockaway Boulevard, 145th Street, 135th Avenue, 140th Street and Rockaway Boulevard again, instead of its previous route via Rockaway Boulevard, 143rd Street, 135th Avenue and 142nd Street.; Terminal loop changed multiple times during the 1980s.; Became a Rush route on August 31, 2025.
Q41	Originally operated by Courier Bus Company, service began on July 10, 1934.; Route in Lindenwood, via 155th and 157th Avenues, added on September 14, 1964.; Between 1980 and 1985, the route's path in Ozone Park was changed with the conversion of 109th Avenue and 130th Streets to one-way streets. Northbound buses were rerouted to turn south for one block on 127th Street, east on 111th Avenue for one block and then north on 130th Street before resuming the previous route at Atlantic Avenue. Southbound buses were rerouted to continue on 127th Street from 109th Avenue to 111th Avenue before heading west on that street until 111th Street, where the route would turn north one block and then resume on its previous route on 109th Street.; The route's path through Ozone Park was modified again between 1985 and December 1989. Southbound buses were rerouted off of Atlantic Avenue at 133rd Street before turning onto 95th Avenue and resuming via 127th Street. Northbound buses were rerouted off of 109th Avenue, instead following the path of southbound buses, turning south onto 111th Street and then east on 111th Avenue, north on 131st Street and west on 109th Avenue to 128th Street, before turning west on Liberty Avenue and then north on 127th Street, before turning east on 95th Avenue, north on 134th Street and back onto Atlantic Avenue.; Extended from Guy R. Brewer Boulevard and Archer Avenue to 165th Street Terminal on October 30, 1989.; On July 1, 2012, service was rerouted off of 111th Avenue to 109th Avenue to cut costs and reduce travel times. Local residents were opposed to the change, arguing that were not given advanced notice, and because the change eliminated parking spaces.; Formerly operated by Green Bus Lines.; Service was removed from 127th Street, 128th Street, and Atlantic Avenue on August 31st, 2025 due to the Queens Bus Redesign. Rerouted via Lakewood Avenue and Sutphin Boulevard.
Q42	Originally operated by North Branch Transit, service began on March 27, 1934.; Later operated by Bee Line, Inc., then Green Bus Lines, then North Shore Bus Company until 1947.; Original western terminus was the 169th Street subway station. Service was rerouted to Jamaica Center on December 11, 1988.; Overnight service eliminated on September 10, 1995, due to a budget crisis.; On August 29, 1993, two-way traffic on Archer Avenue and Jamaica Avenue was restored between 138th Street and 168th Street, undoing changes that took effect in November 1990. The change was made to alleviate heavy traffic on Jamaica Avenue. Q42 service began running on Archer Avenue in both directions. Buses were rerouted to run along Archer Avenue, 165th Street and Liberty Avenue.; Midday service eliminated on June 27, 2010, due to another budget crisis; restored on January 7, 2013. Before the restoration, service ran during weekday rush hours only.
Q43	Originally operated by Schenck Transportation, service began on May 24, 1935.; In 1983, the NYCTA agreed to study the implementation of rush hour expresses on the Q43, making express stops west of Springfield Boulevard.; Limited-stop service began in January 1993.; On August 29, 1993, two-way traffic on Archer Avenue and Jamaica Avenue was restored between 138th Street and 168th Street, undoing changes that took effect in November 1990. Q43 service began running along 146th Street towards the subway and via Sutphin Boulevard leaving the subway. The first stop was moved to Archer Avenue in front of the LIRR station.; On November 17, 1997, westbound limiteds started stopping at 187th Street and Hillside Avenue instead of 188th Street and Hillside Avenue to improve connections with the Q17 and the Q75.; On September 30, 2024, the last stop for Floral Park-bound service was moved from 268th Street to 267th Street.; Q43 Limited service discontinued on June 27, 2025 due to the Queens Bus Redesign.; Limited-Stop Rush service on Hillside Avenue began on June 29, 2025 due to the Queens Bus Redesign.
Q44	North Shore Bus Company began Main Street service between Main Street subway station and Horace Harding Boulevard on May 2, 1933.; Q44 Flushing-Jamaica service began on March 22, 1938.; Extended to West Farms, Bronx along former World's Fair route on October 28, 1940.; Original southern terminus was Jamaica LIRR station; later extended to the 165th Street Bus Terminal.; Bronx service was extended to Bronx Park South-Crotona Parkway in 1984, running all times except late evenings and nights. Service was later cut back to its current terminus in September 1990.; On August 29, 1993, two-way traffic on Archer Avenue and Jamaica Avenue was restored between 138th Street and 168th Street, undoing changes that took effect in November 1990. The change was made to alleviate heavy traffic on Jamaica Avenue. Q44 service began running on Archer Avenue in both directions. Eastbound buses were rerouted from running along Jamaica Avenue between Parsons Boulevard and 168th Street to Archer Avenue.; On January 11, 1998, buses began running on Archer Avenue between Merrick Boulevard and Sutphin Boulevard in both directions.; Limited-stop service between Jamaica and Whitestone introduced on June 27, 1999. Former route between Hillside Avenue and Union Turnpike (via 150th Street and Grand Central Parkway service roads) replaced at that time.; Articulated buses debuted on June 8, 2012.; Converted into Q44 Select Bus Service on November 29, 2015; late-night local service was replaced by the Q20A.
Q45	Service started on June 29, 2025 as part of the Queens Bus Redesign; split out from the Q46.
Q46	North Shore Bus Company began operating the Q44A on December 4, 1939.; Service was extended to Springfield Boulevard on September 7, 1947, with headways ranging from 10 minutes during rush hours to 40 minutes during other times.; Began limited-stop service on February 11, 1974; one of the first two routes to have limited-stop service.; Renumbered to the Q46 on April 15, 1990.; Extended from Lakeville Road to Long Island Jewish Hospital on September 7, 1997.; On November 17, 1997, a limited stop was added at 150th Street and Union Turnpike.; Overnight and weekend service to Glen Oaks was eliminated in September 2002.; Q46 Limited service discontinued on June 27, 2025 due to the Queens Bus Redesign.; Service split into three routes, the Q45, Q46 Rush, and Q48 Rush on June 29, 2025 due to the Queens Bus Redesign. The Q45 would serve local stops between Kew Gardens and 188th Street, while the Q48 would take over the Q46’s Glen Oaks branch.; Limited-Stop Rush service on Union Turnpike west of 188th Street began on June 29, 2025 due to the Queens Bus Redesign.

=== Routes Q47 to Q115 ===
Route	History
Q47	Service began on October 1, 1939.; Formerly operated by Triboro Coach Corporation.; Merged with Q45, also a former Triboro Coach route, on September 4, 2011.; Rerouted in East Elmhurst off of 77th Street southbound to accommodate the street's change to a one-way street in September 2016; Rerouted from LaGuardia Airport to East Elmhurst on August 31, 2025 due to the Queens Bus Redesign.
Q48	Service started on June 30, 2025 as part of the Queens Bus Redesign; created from the Q46 Glen Oaks Branch.; The previous Q48 became the Q90 also on June 30, 2025.
Q49	Service started in January 1938.; Formerly operated by Triboro Coach Corporation.; Renumbered from Q19B on April 20, 2008.
Q50	Service began in the mid-1960s; Formerly operated by Queens Surface Corporation as the QBx1; operated local in the Bronx, with only select trips traveling to Flushing.; Split into Q50 (Flushing−Co-op City Limited) and Bx23 (Co-op City Local) on September 12, 2010.; Off peak service to Co-Op City discontinued on June 26, 2022, due to the Bronx Bus Redesign; early weekdays morning trips restored on September 6, 2022.; The Q50/Q48 drop off stop at Main St and Roosevelt Av was moved to Main St and 39th Avenue due to construction in 2022. This was supposed to be temporary, but was made permanent in 2023 for the DOT's Better Buses action plan.; Gained overnight service starting on June 29, 2025 as part of the Queens Bus Redesign.
Q51	Service started on June 29, 2025 as part of the Queens Bus Redesign; brand new route providing service on Linden Boulevard.
Q52	Created as Q21 rush-hour only limited on January 8, 2012; rerouted from Rockaway Park to serve Arverne by the Sea.; Renumbered to Q52 and expanded to 7 days a week on July 1, 2012.; On April 9, 2017, it was extended from Beach 69th Street and Rockaway Beach Boulevard to Beach 54th Street and Beach Channel Drive to better serve housing in Arverne.; Articulated buses debuted on October 27, 2017.; Route converted into Select Bus Service on November 12, 2017.; Extended to Edgemere on August 31,2025 due to the Queens Bus Redesign.
Q53	Formerly operated by Triboro Coach Corporation.; Created as a replacement service for LIRR Rockaway Beach Branch between Woodside and Rockaway Park on June 24, 1950.; Originally went non-stop between Rego Park and Jamaica Bay Wildlife Refuge.; Converted to limited-stop service along Woodhaven and Cross Bay Boulevards in 2006.; Service to Rego Park station via 63rd Drive discontinued in January 2007.; Service to the Elmhurst business district was added in 2009.; On January 3, 2010, the northbound route's non-stop travel path was modified to run via 39th Avenue and Roosevelt Avenue instead of via Broadway to provide faster service.; Overnight service was added on September 8, 2013.; Articulated buses debuted on October 27, 2017.; The route was converted into Select Bus Service on November 12, 2017.
Q54	Service started on June 12, 1949, to replace BMT streetcar service; the eastern terminus was extended from Jamaica and Metropolitan Avenues to 170th Street at this time.; On November 6, 1954, the NYCTA proposed to truncate service along Jamaica Avenue from 171st Street to Metropolitan Avenue, a distance of 1.6 miles (2.6 km) to cut costs. Free transfers would have been provided to the B22 and B56.; Formerly B53; renumbered on December 11, 1988.; On August 29, 1993, two-way traffic on Archer Avenue and Jamaica Avenue was restored between 138th Street and 168th Street, undoing changes that took effect in November 1990. The change was made to alleviate heavy traffic on Jamaica Avenue. Q54 service began running on Jamaica Avenue in both directions; eastbound buses had been running along Archer Avenue.; Rerouted in Middle Village and Glendale to serve The Shops at Atlas Park on July 1, 2007.
Q55	Descended from Richmond Hill Line trolley service along Myrtle Avenue; replaced by bus service on April 26, 1950.; Formerly had rush-hour short-turn service to/from Woodhaven Boulevard.; Formerly B55; renumbered on December 11, 1988.
Q56	Service started on November 30, 1947, to replace BMT streetcar service.; Formerly B56; renumbered on December 11, 1988.; On August 29, 1993, two-way traffic on Archer Avenue and Jamaica Avenue was restored between 138th Street and 168th Street, undoing changes that took effect in November 1990. The change was made to alleviate heavy traffic on Jamaica Avenue. Q56 service began running on Jamaica Avenue in both directions; eastbound buses had been running along Archer Avenue.
Q58	Descended from Flushing–Ridgewood Line streetcar service; replaced by bus service on July 17, 1949.; Formerly B58; renumbered on December 11, 1988.; Limited-stop service introduced on September 13, 2010.; Q58 Limited service was discontinued on June 29, 2025 due to the Queens Bus Redesign; replaced by the Q98 Limited.
Q59	Originally Grand Street Line streetcar service. Replaced by bus service on December 1, 1949.; On November 6, 1954, the NYCTA proposed to eliminate weekday service between 7 p.m. and 5 a.m. and all weekend service to cut costs. Free transfers would have been provided between the B53 and B57.; Formerly B59; renumbered on December 11, 1988; Original Queens terminus was 72nd Street and Grand Avenue in Maspeth.; 24 hour service was added in January 2008.; Extended from Kent Avenue/Broadway to Williamsburg Bridge Plaza in 2010.
Q60	Service started on April 17, 1937, to replace Queens Boulevard Line streetcar.; Formerly operated by Green Bus Lines.; Overnight service was added in August 2007.; On June 27, 2010, the route was rerouted to stay on Jamaica Avenue instead of diverting to 139th Street and Archer Avenue on the way to Sutphin Boulevard to speed up service by traveling on a direct path on a commercial street.; Service towards Manhattan rerouted to bypass Queens Plaza North and go straight onto the bridge on August 31, 2025 due to the Queens Bus Redesign.
Q61	Service started on June 29, 2025 as part of the Queens Bus Redesign; brand new route replacing the northern portion of the Q34 and the 154th Street portion of the Q15.
Q63	Service started on June 29, 2025 as part of the Queens Bus Redesign; brand new route providing Limited-Stop Rush service on Northern Boulevard.
Q64	Service started on November 14, 1951.; Formerly operated by Queens Surface Corporation.; Formerly Q65A. Renumbered on September 2, 2007.; Overnight service introduced on September 8, 2013, which closed a gap in service from 2:30 a.m. and 4:00 a.m..
Q65	Service started on August 10, 1937, to replace Flushing–Jamaica Line and College Point Line streetcar service.; Formerly operated by Queens Surface Corporation.; The route's southern terminus was moved from 160th Street and Jamaica Avenue to Parsons Boulevard and Jamaica Avenue in 2004.; It was then extended to Jamaica LIRR station on Sutphin Boulevard in 2007.; Limited-stop service introduced in September 2007.; Q65 Limited service was discontinued on June 27, 2025 due to the Queens Bus Redesign.; College Point, Bowne Street, and 45th Avenue service was discontinued on June 29, 2025 due to the Queens Bus Redesign. Service was rerouted to Sanford Avenue and was shortened to Flushing, with College Point service being replaced by the Q26.; On September 4, 2026, Jamaica-bound Q17 and Q65 bus stops swapped in Flushing. Jamaica-bound Q65 buses now makes its first stop at Main Street and 38th Avenue.
Q66	Formerly operated by Queens-Nassau Transit Lines, Queens Transit Corporation, and Queens Surface Corporation.; Original terminus was at 51st Street in Woodside, where the bus connected with the Northern Boulevard subway station.; The route was extended to Queens Plaza on October 29, 1989, to serve the new 21st Street–Queensbridge subway station.
Q67	Service started on October 30, 1937, to replace streetcar service.; Formerly operated by Queens Surface Corporation.; Had part-time service to Hunters Point Ferry as late as June 1996.; On April 12, 2009, westbound buses were rerouted to run via the Queens Midtown Expressway Service Road from 69th Street to Hamilton Place, instead of running via Grand Avenue and crossing the expressway's service roads, to speed up service.; Service to Queens Plaza discontinued on June 29, 2025 due to the Queens Bus Redesign; service was shortened to Court Square.; Route was transferred from MTA Bus Company to NYCT on June 29, 2025.
Q69	Service started in mid-1920s.; Original southern terminus was the Hallets Cove ferry slip, diverted to Queens Plaza on August 10, 1934.; Formerly operated by Triboro Coach Corporation.; Formerly Q19A. Renumbered on April 20, 2008.; Service via Court Square cut on August 31, 2025 due to the Queens Bus Redesign.
Q70	Introduced as a Limited-Stop Service Line on September 8, 2013.; Replaced Q33 service at LaGuardia Airport.; Converted from Limited-Stop Service to Select Bus Service on September 25, 2016, and branded as the "LaGuardia Link".; Articulated buses debuted on June 28, 2020.; Fare-free service began on May 1, 2022.
Q72	Originally northern portion of Grand Street Line streetcar (now the Q59), Flushing–Ridgewood Line (now the Q58) and later North Beach Line between Corona Avenue and Bowery Bay/North Beach Airport.; Junction Boulevard service replaced by buses on August 25, 1949.; Formerly operated by New York City Transit as route B72 until January 21, 1961, and then by Triboro Coach Corporation as Q72 until takeover in 2006.; Former terminus was Ditmars Boulevard and 94th Street.; Extended to LaGuardia Airport in September 2006.; Service to American Airlines hangar was eliminated on September 8, 2013.
Q74	Service started on June 29, 2025 as part of the Queens Bus Redesign; brand new route providing Limited-Stop service on Jewel Avenue and Horace Harding Expressway.
Q75	Service started on June 30, 2025 as part of the Queens Bus Redesign; split out from the Q30.
Q76	Francis Lewis Boulevard bus route proposed and rejected in 1959.; New route created by the New York City Transit Authority on October 29, 1961, as a six-month trial, running between Parsons Boulevard and 14th Avenue in Whitestone and the 179th Street station on Hillside Avenue. Service initially ran on 20-minute headways between 5:30 a.m. and 12:30 a.m.; On December 27, 1961, the NYCTA announced that it planned to apply to the Board of Estimate for permission to switch the travel path of the route for the second half of the trial the following month. Service was rerouted from running via the Long Island Expressway service road and 188th Street to get to Jamaica to staying on Francis Lewis Boulevard to Hillside Avenue. The shift was done so that data for revenue for the new route could be compared with revenue for the existing route.; Extended from 179th Street-Hillside Avenue to 165th Street Terminal in 1989.; Overnight service was eliminated on September 10, 1995, due to a budget crisis.; In June 2000, the MTA announced plans to extend the route from 14th Avenue and Parsons Boulevard in Whitestone to 131st Street and 20th Avenue in College Point via 20th Avenue. Buses would no longer make a terminal loop consisting of Parsons Boulevard, 15th Avenue, 144th Place, and 14th Avenue. Instead, buses would continue south along Parsons Boulevard, and west on 20th Avenue to the terminal at 131st Street. Southbound buses would turn north onto 131st Street, east on 15th Avenue, south on 132nd Street, east on 20th Avenue, north on Parsons Boulevard, and east on 14th Avenue. The extension was intended to improve reliability and provide access to the growing commercial district along 20th Avenue from northeastern and southeastern Queens. In addition, southbound service would be rerouted via Cross Island Parkway Service Road instead of 14th Avenue and Clintonville Street to match the less circuitous route used by northbound service. The extension was estimated to cost about $300,000 a year, while the rerouting was expected to save about $10,000 a year. The change took effect on September 11, 2000.; Saturday service eliminated on June 27, 2010, due to another budget crisis, but restored on September 8, 2012, along with new Sunday service.; Service on 20th Avenue and Parsons Boulevard was discontinued and rerouted to 14th Avenue on June 29, 2025 due to the Queens Bus Redesign; service replaced by the Q20.
Q77	Francis Lewis Boulevard bus route originally proposed and rejected in 1959.; New route created by the New York City Transit Authority; Service started on September 13, 1965 as a four-month trial in order to serve Andrew Jackson High School.; Originally operated between the 179th Street station, and the intersection of Springfield Boulevard and Merrick Boulevard.; On September 10, 1973, service was extended 1.5 miles to Springfield Boulevard and 145th Road to serve Springfield Gardens High School, Junior High School 231, and provide additional service to Springfield Gardens.; Service was extended from 179th Street and Hillside Avenue to 165th Street Terminal on September 11, 1989. On the same date, the span of weekday system was extended for an additional hour in the evening. Saturday service was introduced on September 16, 1989.; Sunday service was added on April 6, 2014.; On January 5, 2020, the route's southern terminal was moved from Springfield Boulevard and 145th Road to Springfield Boulevard and 145th Avenue. Southbound buses run via South Conduit Avenue, 225th Street and 145th Avenue to Springfield Boulevard. On January 3, 2021, the route's southern terminal was moved from Springfield Boulevard and 145th Avenue to South Conduit Avenue and 221st Street. The stop at Springfield Boulevard at 225th Street was eliminated. The route's terminal loop was modified to be South Conduit Avenue, 225th Street, and North Conduit Avenue.; Limited-Stop Rush service on Hillside Avenue as well as a southern extension to Rockaway Boulevard began on June 29, 2025 due to the Queens Bus Redesign.
Q80	Service started on August 31, 2025 as part of the Queens Bus Redesign; brand new route replacing the Q10 Limited branch. Local route for the Q10 Rush.
Q82	Service started on June 29, 2025 as part of the Queens Bus Redesign; brand new route replacing the 212th Street and 212th Place portion of the Q36 and the Hempstead Avenue portion of the Q110, as well as providing Limited-Stop Rush service on Hillside Avenue.
Q83	Originally operated by Bee Line Bus, service began in 1923.; The route was extended from Springfield Boulevard and 114th Avenue to 227th Street and 113th Drive between 1946 and 1949.; On November 29, 1956, the NYCTA approved a slate of changes in bus service citywide to take effect on January 22, 1957. Among the changes was the extension of Q3A service to the 179th Street subway station to eliminate congestion at 169th Street.; Formerly Q3A; renumbered and rerouted on December 11, 1988, to Jamaica Center.; On August 29, 1993, two-way traffic on Archer Avenue and Jamaica Avenue was restored between 138th Street and 168th Street, undoing changes that took effect in November 1990. The change was made to alleviate heavy traffic on Jamaica Avenue. Buses were rerouted to run along Archer Avenue, 165th Street and Liberty Avenue.; Full-time service on the branch via Springfield Boulevard to the Queens Village LIRR station was eliminated on January 4, 2004, with service replaced by an extension of the Q27 from the Queens Village LIRR station to 120th Avenue and Springfield Boulevard.; On January 12, 2004, Jamaica-bound limited-stop service in the a.m. rush hour was rerouted to Liberty Avenue and 160th Street from 168th Street and Archer Avenue to match the travel path during the p.m. rush hour.; Limited-stop service started stopping at Liberty Avenue and 177th Street in both directions on November 3, 2008, to allow for transfers with the Q42.; Q83 Limited service was discontinued on June 27, 2025 due to the Queens Bus Redesign.; Overnight service to Queens Village LIRR discontinued on June 29, 2025 due to the Queens Bus Redesign; replaced by overnight service to Cambria Heights.
Q84	Originally operated by Bee Line Bus, service began in 1923.; On February 18, 1962, it was extended from 122nd Avenue and 199th Street to its present terminus at 238th Street and 130th Avenue for a six-month test period. On July 27, 1962, it was announced that it would be made permanent.; Original western terminus was the 169th Street subway station; Service was rerouted to Jamaica Center on December 11, 1988, and was renumbered from the Q4A to the Q84.; On August 29, 1993, two-way traffic on Archer Avenue and Jamaica Avenue was restored between 138th Street and 168th Street, undoing changes that took effect in November 1990. The change was made to alleviate heavy traffic on Jamaica Avenue. Q84 service began running on Archer Avenue in both directions. Outbound trips had run on Jamaica Avenue between Parsons Boulevard and Merrick Boulevard.; Limited-Stop Rush service on Merrick Boulevard began on June 29, 2025 due to the Queens Bus Redesign.
Q85	Originally owned by Bee Line Bus.; Formerly Q5A and Q5AB.; The Bedell Street branch of the Q5A began operation on August 9, 1964, to serve Rochdale Village and reduce congestion on the other routes along Merrick Boulevard. This branch would start at Bedell Avenue and 133rd Avenue, run along Bedell Avenue, Baisley Boulevard, Merrick Boulevard, 168th Street, 88th Avenue, and 168th Place, and then would run via Hillside Avenue east of 167th Street. Service would return by Hillside Avenue, Merrick Boulevard to the 165th Street bus terminal, Merrick Boulevard, Baisley Boulevard and Bedell Street. This service, which was requested by Queens Borough President Mario J. Cariello, would run weekdays between 6 a.m. and 12 a.m., and from 10 a.m. to 6 p.m. on weekends and holidays. Rush hour service would be every ten minutes, and every 20 minutes during weekdays off-peak, and Sundays and holidays, and every 15 minutes on Saturdays. Early morning service on this branch was added at some point afterwards.; On September 10, 1973, to better serve Rosedale, Q5A service was scheduled to be extended a half-mile to 253rd Street and 149th Avenue, and Jamaica-bound service was rerouted off of Brookville Boulevard and onto 243rd Street. The new route had been approved by Community Board 13 in December 1972. On September 14, 1973, members of the Rosedale Block Association, who had refused to let buses travel along Huxley Avenue between met with Queens Borough President Manes between 147th Avenue and 149th Avenue, which was part of the new route. Residents claimed that the street was too narrow for buses and that the street was too prone to flooding after rainstorms. By this date, Q5A buses did not attempt to use the new route, and the NYCTA did not plan to do so until an agreement was reached with residents.; On April 20, 1975, to cut costs, service on the Farmers Boulevard branch to Huxley Street between 1:15 a.m. and 5 a.m. was eliminated. Early morning service via Bedell Street was maintained.; On September 26, 1982, wheelchair-accessible buses began operating on the Q5A and 17 other city bus routes.; On September 11, 1983, service on the Q5AB was increased, and service on the Q5A was increased in February 1984.; On December 15, 1985, the NYCTA announced it was reconsidering its plan to adjust service to Rochdale Village, and would conduct a survey with community input over the following three to four weeks. Many local residents were opposed to NYCTA's plan to consolidate the Q5A and Q5AB routes. Bus service along the seven blocks on Farmers Boulevard between Bedell Street and Merrick Boulevard would be discontinued.; On September 13, 1987, the NYCTA implemented a series of service reductions in Southeast Queens, including the combination of the Q5A, which ran to 243rd Street and 147th Avenue in Rosedale via Conduit Avenue, with the Q5AB Bedell Street route, which ran to Rochdale, to form the Q85, with reduced service on Merrick Boulevard. These routes were operated as a single service during late evenings and early mornings.; Original western terminus was the 169th Street subway station.; Service was rerouted to Jamaica Center on December 11, 1988.; In March 1992, merchants in Jamaica criticized a NYCTA proposal to extend the Q85 to Green Acres Mall in Valley Stream as they believed it would divert shoppers from their stores to promote economic development in Nassau County. The proposal was spurred due to surveys showing that people in Southeast Queens wanted additional service to the mall. This extension took effect on September 20, 1992, with buses running to the mall every 25 minutes between 9 a.m. and 12 a.m.; On August 29, 1993, two-way traffic on Archer Avenue and Jamaica Avenue was restored between 138th Street and 168th Street, undoing changes that took effect in November 1990. The change was made to alleviate heavy traffic on Jamaica Avenue. Q85 service began running on Archer Avenue in both directions. Outbound trips had run on Jamaica Avenue between Parsons Boulevard and Merrick Boulevard.; Q85 limited-stop service began on the Rosedale branch on January 10, 1994 during rush hours eastbound between 4:00 p.m. and 7:20 p.m. and westbound between 6:35 a.m. and 8:50 a.m. Limited-stop buses would make local stops between Bedell Street and Rosedale. Service to Green Acres Mall continued to run local.; On January 12, 2004, Jamaica-bound limited-stop service in the a.m. rush hour was rerouted to Liberty Avenue and 160th Street from 168th Street and Archer Avenue to match the travel path during the p.m. rush hour.; Q85 Limited service was discontinued on June 27, 2025 due to the Queens Bus Redesign.; Limited-Stop Rush service on Merrick Boulevard began on June 29, 2025 due to the Queens Redesign.; Green Acres branch was renamed to the Q89 on June 29, 2025 due to the Queens Bus Redesign.
Q86	Service started on June 29, 2025 as part of the Queens Bus Redesign; brand new route replacing the Rosedale LIRR portion of the Q5, supplementing Q85 service on 243rd Street, and bringing new service to Rosedale on 149th Avenue. Additionally provides Limited-Stop Rush service on Merrick Boulevard north of Springfield Boulevard.
Q87	Service started on June 29, 2025 as part of the Queens Bus Redesign, replacing the Green Acres branch of the Q5. Additionally provides Limited-Stop Rush service on Merrick Boulevard north of Springfield Boulevard.
Q88	New route created by the New York City Transit Authority.; On January 25, 1974, the New York City Board of Estimate approved the route, given that the NYCTA provide annual ridership, loss, and profit data to the city's Franchise Bureau. At the time, it was expected that free transfers would be provided to the Q17, Q17A, Q31, and Q44 bus routes. While Queens Borough President Donald Manes had been assured that bus service would begin in two to three months, the NYCTA's general manager refused to begin service as the city demanded some financial records it did not want to release. The NYCTA had held that its bus operations were only subject to review by the city controller's office, and had fought against efforts by the Franchise Bureau to provide oversight. While the Franchise Bureau previously had no clear authority to mandate that the NYCTA provide financial data, the resolution approving the Q88 route required the NYCTA to provide relevant data after one year of operation. A NYCTA spokesperson, in June 1974, said that it was up to the Franchise Bureau to get an opinion from the corporation counsel to resolve the issue. In August 1974, the city was about to take away NYCTA's authorization for the route and instead award it to Triboro Coach on an experimental basis until August 31, 1975. The Board of Estimate approved the route after the NYCTA agreed to informally provide the data for the new route without having to allow the city to audit its records.; Service started on September 16, 1974, after the New York City Board of Estimate approved a franchise for the route on September 12. The route's original eastern terminal was Springfield Boulevard and Union Turnpike. Bus service initially ran daily except Sundays between 6:30 a.m. and 11 p.m.. It ran every ten minutes during rush hours, and every twenty minutes at other times.; In November 1974, the NYCTA studied extending the route to serve Queensborough Community College to address the lack of student parking. In December 1974, a free transfer was instituted between the Q88 and the Q17A. The Board of Estimate had approved the Q88 route in January 1974 on the condition that this free transfer be provided.; In January 1979, it was announced that Q88 service would be extended from Union Turnpike to Hillside Avenue, with those buses heading along Springfield Boulevard to Jamaica Avenue, on the way to Queens Village Bus Depot, running in service, making stops along Springfield Boulevard, instead of deadheading. Free transfers would also be provided to the Q1 and Q27 for riders continuing south along Springfield Boulevard. The NYCTA decided against extending all Q88 trips to Jamaica Avenue due to a lack of buses. The changes took effect on March 4, 1979.; In September 1983, bus service was increased due to increased ridership and the proliferation of gypsy cabs along the route. One additional bus was added to the route to make short-run trips between Queens Boulevard and Queens College.; On July 15, 1988, the MTA Board approved the extension of all trips on the route along Springfield Boulevard from Hillside Avenue to Jamaica Avenue to simplify service. At the time, 40 percent of trips operate to and from Jamaica Avenue, on an irregular basis. The change took effect on September 11, 1988.; In April 2001, the MTA announced that the span of Sunday service from 7:10 p.m. to 11:15 p.m. would be extended. The change, which was estimated to cost $30,000 a year, was to be implemented in June 2001.
Q89	Service started on June 29, 2025 as part of the Queens Bus Redesign, replacing the Green Acres portion of the Q85. Additionally provides Limited-Stop Rush service on Merrick Boulevard.
Q90	Service started on June 29, 2025 as part of the Queens Bus Redesign; brand new route replacing the old Q48. Service reaches LaGuardia Airport via Seaver Way and Northern Boulevard instead of Roosevelt Avenue and 108th Street.
Q98	Service started on June 29, 2025 as part of the Queens Bus Redesign; brand new route replacing the Q58 Limited. Service reaches Flushing via Queens Boulevard and Horace Harding Expressway instead of Corona Avenue.
Q100	Started service in the 1980s.; Formerly operated by Queens Surface Corporation until takeover in 2005.; Formerly Q101R; renumbered the Q100 on April 6, 2008.; Originally non-stop between Long Island City and Rikers Island parking lot.; Limited-stop service along 21st Street began on February 1, 2009.
Q101	Service started on November 1, 1939, to replace Steinway Street Line streetcar service.; Formerly operated by Steinway Transit until 1988, and then by Queens Surface Corporation until takeover in 2005.; Original northern terminus was Rikers' Island; when the Q101R (now Q100) was created, service was truncated to 19 Avenue. Prior to the creation of the Q101R, this route was the only local bus route to traverse three boroughs, since Rikers' Island is located in The Bronx.; On October 10, 2010, the route's Manhattan terminal was moved from Second Avenue and East 58th Street to avoid obstructing the bus lane for the planned M15 Select Bus Service. The new last stop was moved to East 61st Street between First Avenue and Second Avenue, while a new first stop was established at the southwest corner of East 61st Street and Second Avenue.; Q101 service cut from Manhattan and rerouted to Hunters Point Ferry on August 31, 2025 due to the Queens Bus Redesign.
Q102	Service started on September 29, 1939, to replace a Steinway Streetcar.; Formerly operated by Steinway Transit until 1988, and then by Queens Surface Corporation until takeover in 2005.; Starting on April 18, 2010, all service began traveling through Roosevelt Island in the same direction and some closely spaced bus stops on the island were discontinued.; Newtown Avenue, Crescent Street, and Astoria Boulevard segment discontinued in favor of operating via 30th Avenue on June 29, 2014; Service cut from Astoria and rerouted to Court Square on August 31, 2025 due to the Queens Bus Redesign. Service on Roosevelt Island cut from Cornell Tech to the Tramway station.
Q103	Service started on September 29, 1939, to replace a Steinway Streetcar.; Formerly operated by Steinway Transit until 1988, and then by Queens Surface Corporation until takeover in 2005.; Weekend service was added and the span of weekday service hours were extended from 7:30 p.m. to 9 p.m. on June 29, 2014, on a pilot basis. On March 20, 2015, it was announced that the changes would be made permanent.; Service extended to Hunters Point Ferry on August 31, 2025 due to the Queens Bus Redesign.; Southbound service also was rerouted from 40th Avenue to 41st Avenue due to community feedback of the redesign on April 12, 2026.
Q104	Service started on September 29, 1939, to replace a Steinway Streetcar line.; Formerly operated by Steinway Transit until 1988, and then by Queens Surface Corporation until takeover in 2005.
Q110	Formerly operated by Jamaica Buses.; Originally Route A; replacement for Jamaica Avenue-Hempstead Turnpike trolley service on November 25, 1933.; Original terminus was 168th Street station, which was the former terminus of the surface line.; On May 2, 2007, the Q110 started serving the racetrack on racing days.; Service rerouted from Belmont Park to Floral Park along Jamaica Avenue and Jericho Turnpike on June 29, 2025 due to the Queens Bus Redesign. Discontinued service on Hempstead Avenue replaced by the Q82.
Q111	Formerly operated by Jamaica Buses as Route B (Jamaica-Hook Creek).; Originally part of the current Q113; separated into Route B in the 1950s; renumbered the Q111 by 1960.; Between 1985 and December 1989, the route was cut back to Peninsula Boulevard and Rockaway Turnpike; the route had gone further west on Peninsula Boulevard.; Articulated buses debuted on May 18, 2016.; Limited-Stop Rush service on Guy R Brewer Boulevard began on June 29, 2025 due to the Queens Bus Redesign.; Short turns to Farmers Boulevard in Springfield Gardens renamed to the Q115 on June 29, 2025 due to the Queens Bus Redesign.
Q112	Formerly operated by Jamaica Buses.; Originally Route C; replacement for Liberty Avenue trolley service on December 3, 1933.; Original terminus was the 168th Street elevated station; Between 1980 and 1985, Rockaway Boulevard-bound buses were rerouted off of Union Hall Street between Archer Avenue and Liberty Avenue, and onto Archer Avenue, Guy R Brewer Boulevard, and Liberty Avenue. Bus service continued to run via Union Hall Street between Jamaica Avenue and Archer Avenue, and between Liberty Avenue and South Road. This change was made because Union Hall Street was closed between these streets to traffic, and became part of the York College campus.; Between 1985 and December 1989, service was streamlined in Jamaica, and southbound buses stopped running via Union Hall Street, instead running via Guy R Brewer Boulevard along with the Q111 and Q113.; Terminal loop in Jamaica rerouted in the late 1980s.; Extended to East New York on June 29, 2025 due to the Queens Bus Redesign, replacing Q7 service.
Q113	Formerly operated by Jamaica Buses; originally Route B and Route D; replacement for Jamaica Central Railways' Jamaica–Far Rockaway trolley line.; Rockaway−Nassau County portion of route began operation in September 1930.; The full-route to Jamaica began operating on November 12, 1933.; Original terminals were 168th Street station in Jamaica and the Far Rockaway LIRR station (site of the current subway station).; Service to Seagirt Boulevard began on April 20, 1952, following disruption of LIRR Rockaway service.; Between 1985 and December 1985, southbound buses were rerouted from Beach Channel Drive and Mott Avenue to Nameoke Avenue and Central Avenue.; Limited-stop service extended on Guy R. Brewer Boulevard, and expanded to Saturdays on March 12, 2007.; Limited-stop service shifted onto Rockaway Boulevard between Springfield Gardens and Five Towns on July 3, 2011.; Local service split into the Q114 on August 31, 2014.; Articulated buses debuted on May 18, 2016.
Q114	Formerly operated by Jamaica Buses as the local portion of the Q113.; Originally Route B and Route D.; Renumbered to Q114 on August 31, 2014, when limited service was introduced on 147th Avenue west of Brookville Boulevard. Local service along Guy R. Brewer Boulevard and 147th Avenue was replaced by the Q111.; Local service was formerly late nights only; extended to evening hours on January 4, 2015.; Articulated buses debuted on May 18, 2016.; Q114 Limited service rebranded into Q114 Rush service on June 29, 2025 due to the Queens Bus Redesign.
Q115	Service started on June 29, 2025 as part of the Queens Bus Redesign; split out from the Q111.
