= Q26 (New York City bus) =

Bus route in Queens, New York

q26
- College Point Line
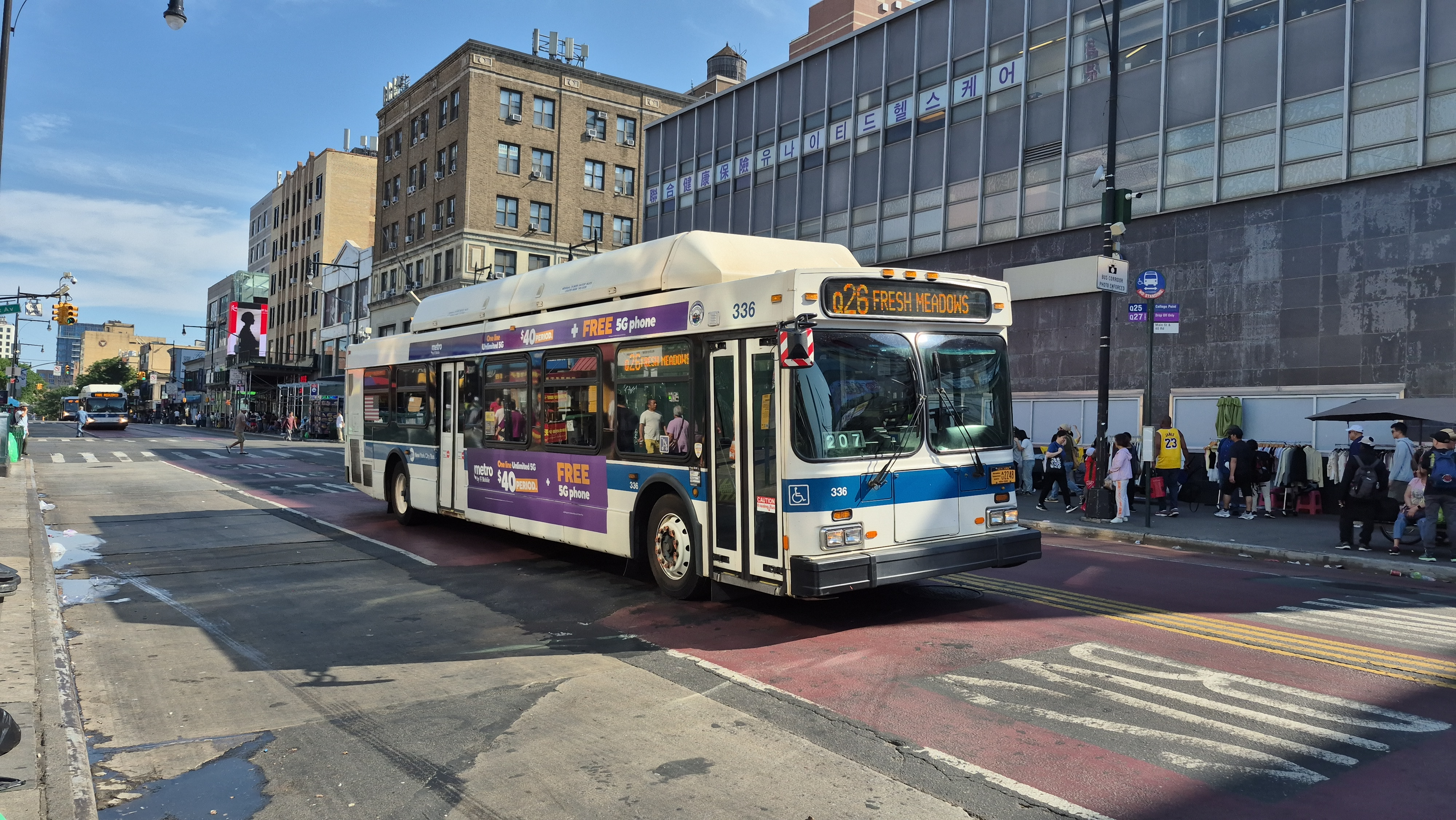
- 2011-12 C40LF 336 on the Fresh Meadows-bound Q26 in Flushing on June 29, 2025.

Overview
- System: MTA Regional Bus Operations
- Operator: MTA Bus Company
- Garage: College Point Depot
- Vehicle: New Flyer C40LF CNG
- Began service: 1931

Route
- Locale: Queens, New York, U.S.
- Communities served: College Point, Flushing, Auburndale, Fresh Meadows
- Landmarks served: Flushing Cemetery, Flushing Hospital Medical Center
- Start: College Point - 110th Street
- Via: College Point Boulevard (24 hours), 46th Avenue, Hollis Court Boulevard (all times except late nights)
- End: Fresh Meadows – Francis Lewis Boulevard & Hollis Court Boulevard (all day); Flushing – Main Street & Roosevelt Avenue / Flushing–Main Street station (overnight)
- Length: 6 miles (9.7 km)
- Other routes: Q27 Springfield Boulevard (North)/46th/47th/48th Avenues

Service
- Operates: 24 hours
- Annual patronage: 1,760,012 (2025)
- Transfers: Yes
- Timetable: Q26

The Q26 bus route constitutes a public transit line in Queens, New York City. It runs primarily along College Point Boulevard, 46th Avenue and Hollis Court Boulevard, between the intersections of 110th Street/14th Avenue in College Point and Hollis Court and Francis Lewis Boulevards in Fresh Meadows. The route is operated by MTA Regional Bus Operations under the MTA Bus Company brand.

The Q26 was founded in 1931 and was operated by the North Shore Bus Company until 1947. The route initially ran from Flushing to Queens Village but was cut back from Queens Village to Fresh Meadows in 1957. Weekend and overnight service was discontinued in 1995, and off-peak weekday service was cut back in 2010, making the Q26 a rush-hour-only bus route between Flushing and Fresh Meadows. On June 29, 2025, service was expanded back to 24 hours and extended north from Flushing to College Point via College Point Boulevard. At night, service runs only from College Point to Flushing.

== Route description and service ==
The Q26 begins at the College Point Line's terminal at 110th Street and 14th Avenue, and follows the former trolley route to Northern Boulevard. After running on Main Street and Kissena Boulevard, interchanging with the IRT Flushing Line subway at Flushing–Main Street, Long Island Rail Road's Port Washington Branch at Flushing–Main Street, and several other bus routes, it turns left on Sanford Avenue. Buses then continue east via Parsons Boulevard until 46th Avenue, and proceed until the avenue becomes Hollis Court Boulevard at Utopia Parkway. Then buses turn left at 58th Avenue and right at Francis Lewis Boulevard to the terminal at 58th Avenue. Buses then head out of service and go south via Francis Lewis Boulevard and turn onto Hollis Court Boulevard to start westbound service at 58th Avenue.

Westbound service heads northwest via Hollis Court Boulevard until Utopia Parkway, when the street becomes 46th Avenue. It then turns right onto Parsons Boulevard, left on Sanford Avenue and right on Kissena Boulevard. Buses then continue onto Main Street, College Point Boulevard, and 14th Avenue back to 110th Street.

Overnight service from College Point terminates at the Flushing–Main Street station in Flushing.

== History ==
=== Start of service ===
Service on a route between Flushing and Queens Village, later to become the Q26, was originally operated by Z & M Coach Company. The route was divided into two five-cent fare zones by the company. By 1932, the franchise for the route was pending before the New York City Board of Estimate. In 1933, the company used twelve buses on the route, which was still unfranchised. That April, about a hundred people, primarily women, protested to mayor John P. O'Brien in support of a 10-cent franchise for the Flushing-Queens Village route, instead of a proposed 5-cent operation. The riders were complaining that the proposed franchise operated by Flushing Queens Bus Company Inc. was unreliable. At the time, Z & M and North Shore Bus Company, two 10-cent franchises, were competing over the route. The mayor promised to postpone the award of the bus franchise for a month, but shortened that to three weeks after riders continued to protest over the delays.

On November 17, 1933, the Board of Estimate denied an application from the Flushing Queens Bus Company for a franchise to run a route between Flushing and Queens Village parallel to this route. That company had proposed a route with a five-cent fare. The Division of Franchises had recommended that the Board decline the application until a policy was agreed upon for Queens buses.

On March 7, 1934, the Division of Franchises made public its list of bus routes for which the New York City Board of Estimate would be receiving bids on March 30. One of the two changes from the previous year was the creation of the Q26 running between Rosewood (a section of Bayside) and Queens Village. The route was to be operated by the North Shore Bus Company. The route originally operated from 47th Avenue and Hollis Court Boulevard, along Hollis Court Boulevard (which used to run through Cunningham Park), 212th Street (now part of the Clearview Expressway), and Jamaica Avenue (along the current Q110 route) to 257th Street.

On April 26, 1935, New York City granted Z & M Coach Corporation a franchise to operate the new Q26 route for a period ending no later than December 31, 1938. At public hearings at the New York State Transit Commission to obtain certification for the franchise, it was found that Z & M operated the Q26 route at a fare greater than provided for in the franchise contract. The hearings closed on June 18, and the Transit Commission gave Z & M an opportunity to revise the franchise with New York City. On October 4, 1935, the Board of Estimate adopted a resolution giving the company a 90-day extension from October 23 to get the franchise certified. On January 29, 1936, the Transit Commission declined to certify the route as the extension expired.

On October 22, 1935, the Board of Estimate approved a plan to divide Queens into four zones for bus operating franchise purposes in order to relieve traffic in the borough. With the new zone setup, one company would be awarded the franchise in each zone, with any remaining smaller operations acquired by the larger company. On September 24, 1936, the Board of Estimate voted to grant franchises to three of the four zones. Since the Q26 was located in Zone B, covering Flushing, it would be awarded to the North Shore Bus Company. The new franchise would last ten years and be subject to termination by the city at sixty days' notice after five years. On November 9, 1936, the operation of the route was transferred to the North Shore Bus Company.

=== World War II and post-war ===
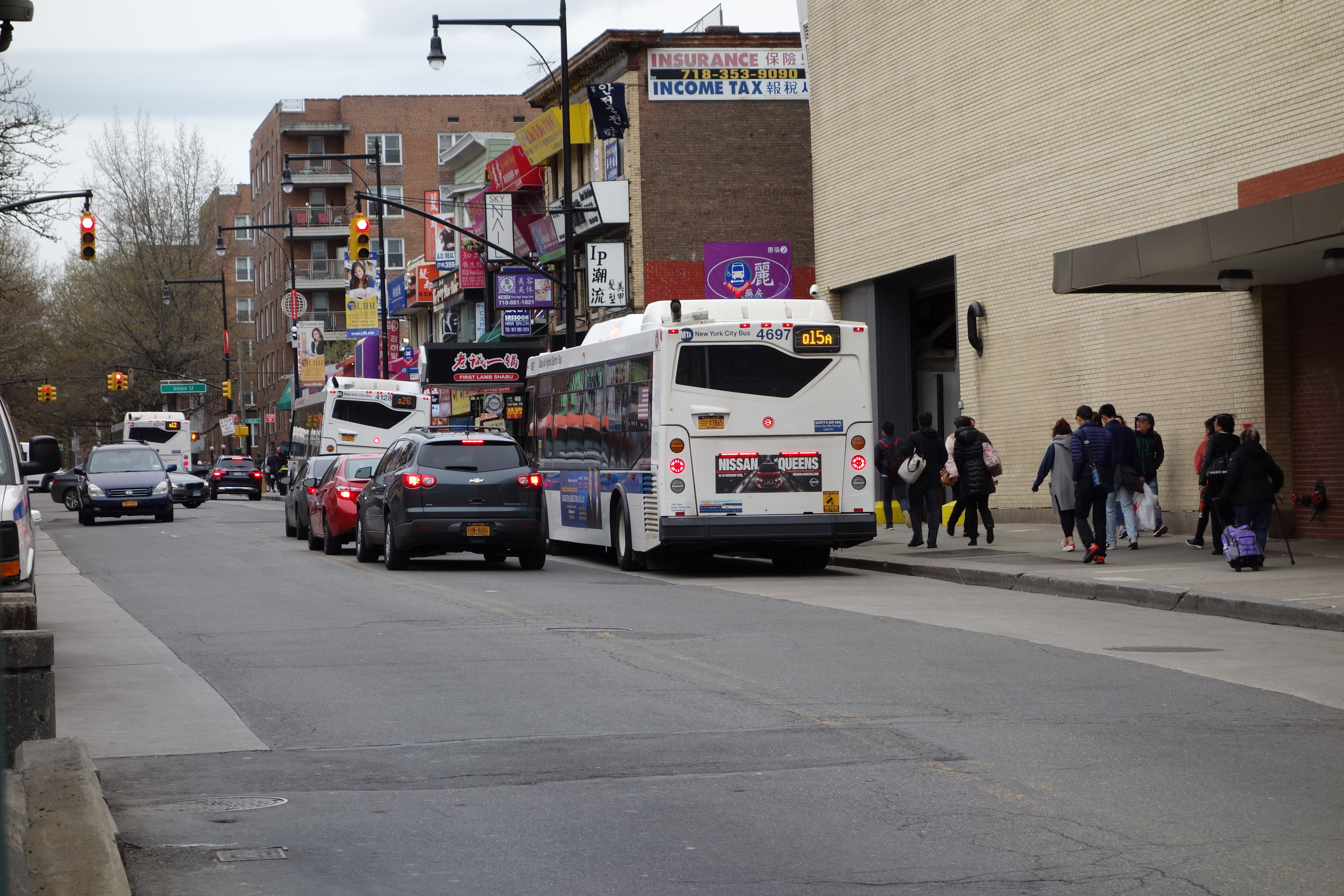
Two Orion VII NG HEVs: one 2009 (4128) on the Q26 and one 2010 (4697) on the Q15A at former Roosevelt Avenue terminal in May 2018.

In December 1941, 300 bus riders complained to the Transit Commission, asking that full service on the Q26 be restored. Their petition was supported by a letter from Assemblyman Henry J. Latham, who called for a full review of service on the route. The petition charged that service had gotten worse since North Shore took over the route, and that on November 17, rush hour bus service was decreased, with service running on 30 minute headways instead of 20 minute headways without notice. In addition, it noted that the new schedule did not accommodate increased ridership during rush hours, resulting in overcrowding, and that riders had to leave earlier for work or return later from work due to worse bus service. Riders also noted that service on the route now operated hourly on Sunday instead of half-hourly.

Service south of Francis Lewis Boulevard and Horace Harding Boulevard, to Jamaica Avenue at the Queens Village station of the Long Island Rail Road, became rush hours only during World War II as North Shore was required to reduce bus service to preserve rubber. This change took effect on June 8, 1942. With the curtailment of the route, riders near the new terminus at Horace Harding Boulevard benefited from a reduction of their fare. The route had a zoned fare structure, with two five-cent zones, with the first zone ending at 52nd Avenue and Hollis Court Boulevard. The change allowed riders between 52nd Avenue and Horace Harding Boulevard to go to Flushing for only five cents, instead of ten. In addition, it made it easier for Q26 riders to get seats and to board buses since there were no sidewalks along this section of Hollis Court Boulevard. To keep the route's franchise operative, one bus a day, the 6:15 a.m., continued from Horace Harding Boulevard to Queens Village station. After service was cut for World War II, the Emerald Park Civic Association called for improved service on the route, noting that service ended at 7 p.m. on Sundays and 1 a.m.. on weekdays and that service ran on 40-minute headways after 7 p.m. and all day Sunday.

In 1944, the Emerald Park Civic Association fought to have North Shore construct bus shelters along Hollis Court Boulevard to protect local residents on cold winter mornings. Since the company and city ignored their request, members of the group went door to door to raise funds for the construction of three shelters. With these funds, they constructed three shelters out of wood and concrete, measuring 15 feet (4.6 m) long by 9 feet (2.7 m) wide, each of which had a bench and could fit 25 people. One shelter was constructed at 58th Avenue and Horace Harding Boulevard and two shelters were constructed at Horace Harding Boulevard and 53rd Avenue. On September 13, 1945, the group called on North Shore to replace old buses on the route. Early in May 1946, North Shore restored some Q26 service to Queens Village, with buses heading there on the hour. Later that month, the rush hour headway of bus service was decreased from 15 to 10 minutes. In 1946, the route's franchise was up for renewal.

On March 30, 1947, North Shore Bus would be taken over by the New York City Board of Transportation (later the New York City Transit Authority) since it could not operate on the mandated five-cent fare and went bankrupt, making the bus routes city operated. On July 1, 1948, fare zones on the route were eliminated. It was the only Queens route with fare zones. In October 1948, the Hollis Court Civic Association compiled data for a survey to accompany a petition that it planned to send to the Mayor and the president of the Board of Transportation calling for improved Q26 bus service. The group noted that the area had experienced dramatic population growth, making the route's schedule inadequate. It noted that service ended at 1 a.m. and started at 6:20 a.m. with service operating on 40-minute headways after 9 p.m. The campaign for improved Q26 service was started by the Emerald Park Civic Association in 1945. In November 1948, the chairman of the Board of Transportation informed the Civic Association that he would personally consider the group's requests. In response to the group's request, Q26 service began running overnight on December 19, 1948.

In August 1948, Matur Homes, Incorporated brought a case with the Emerald Park Civic Association over its bus shelters, complaining that someone refused to take title to the new home next to the shelter until the 58th Avenue shelter was removed. However, the case was dismissed after trial, with the judge ruling that the interests of the majority had to be served. In October 1948, the Emerald Park Civic Association was required to move the 53rd Avenue shelter 50 feet (15 m) to the south because homes were being constructed nearby. In January 1949, Matur initiated an order to remove the 58th Avenue shelter under squatter law. While Matur contended to own the land under the structure, the Emerald Park director stated that it was city-owned land when it was installed. On July 13, 1949, Emerald Park Civic Association officials announced that a second court action threatened their continued maintenance of the bus shelters along Hollis Court Boulevard, having been served a summons due to another complaint by Matur Homes. Matur sought the removal of the 58th Avenue shelter, stating that the Veterans Administration was turning down applications for G.I. loans for homes in the neighborhood, objecting to the effect of the shelters on realty values.

On January 16, 1951, the Tyholland Civic Association of Bayside Hills made another plea for the implementation of rush hour express service on the Q26, which the Board had rejected the previous year. The Board had ruled that express service was unnecessary and that it would worsen riders would have their stops skipped. Tyholland also suggested moving the terminal for the Q26 in Flushing from the north side of Roosevelt Avenue west of Main Street to somewhere else to prevent Q27 riders from boarding a Q26 if it arrived first. Q27 service ran every 3 to 5 minutes during rush hours, compared to the Q26's 10 minutes, making it harder for riders dependent on the Q26 to get a seat. The Board finally agreed to study a proposal for express service on the Q26 during evening rush hours on December 26, 1951. The proposal called for reducing the number of stops along the shared segment of the Q26 and Q27 along 46th Avenue between Parsons Boulevard and Hollis Court Boulevard to four. The change was expected to discourage Q27 riders from taking whatever bus came first in Flushing, providing room on Q26 buses for riders who were completely dependent on the route.

=== Permanent cuts ===
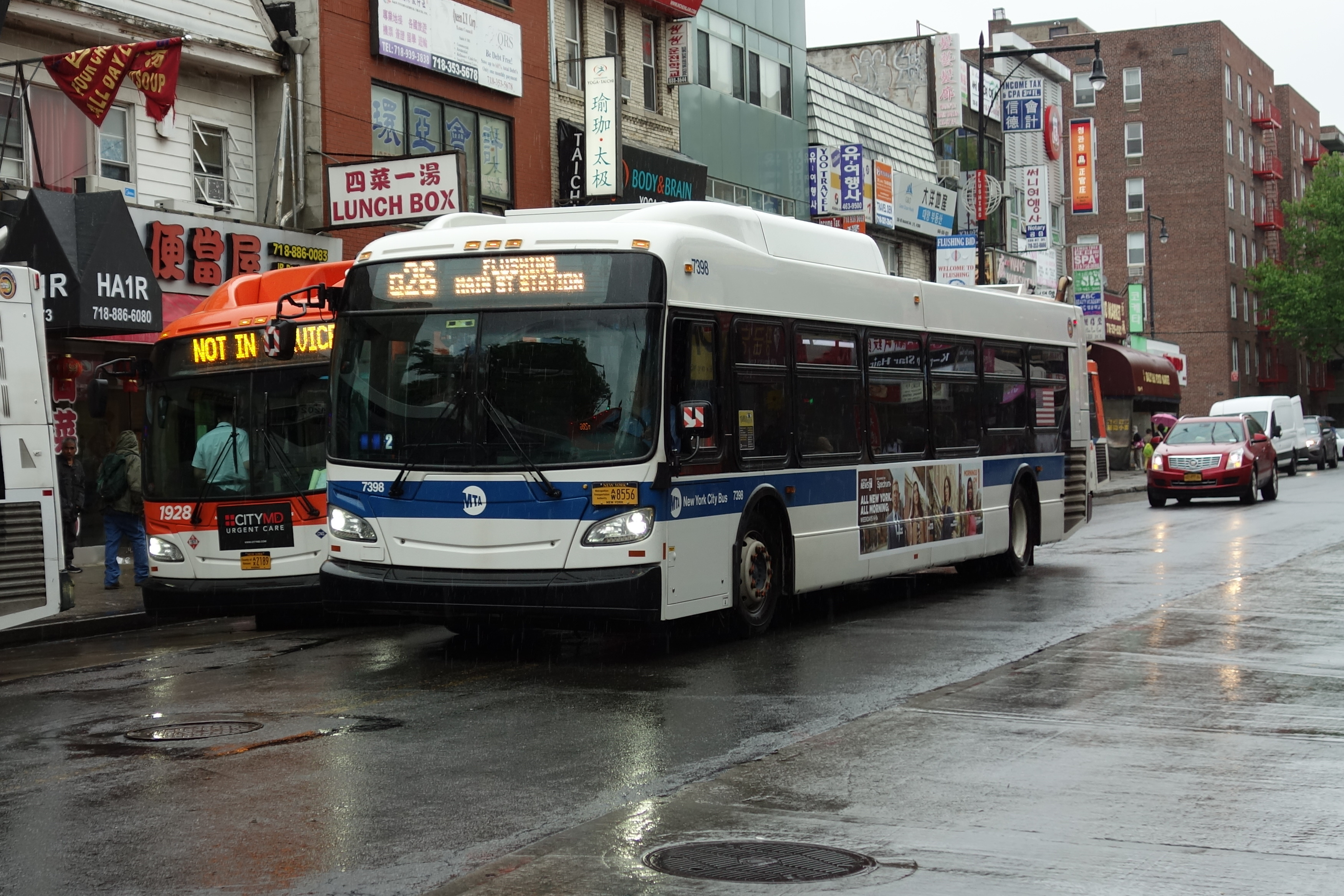
A 2015 New Flyer XD40 (7398) on the Flushing-bound Q26 at Roosevelt Ave/Lippmann Plaza in May 2018.

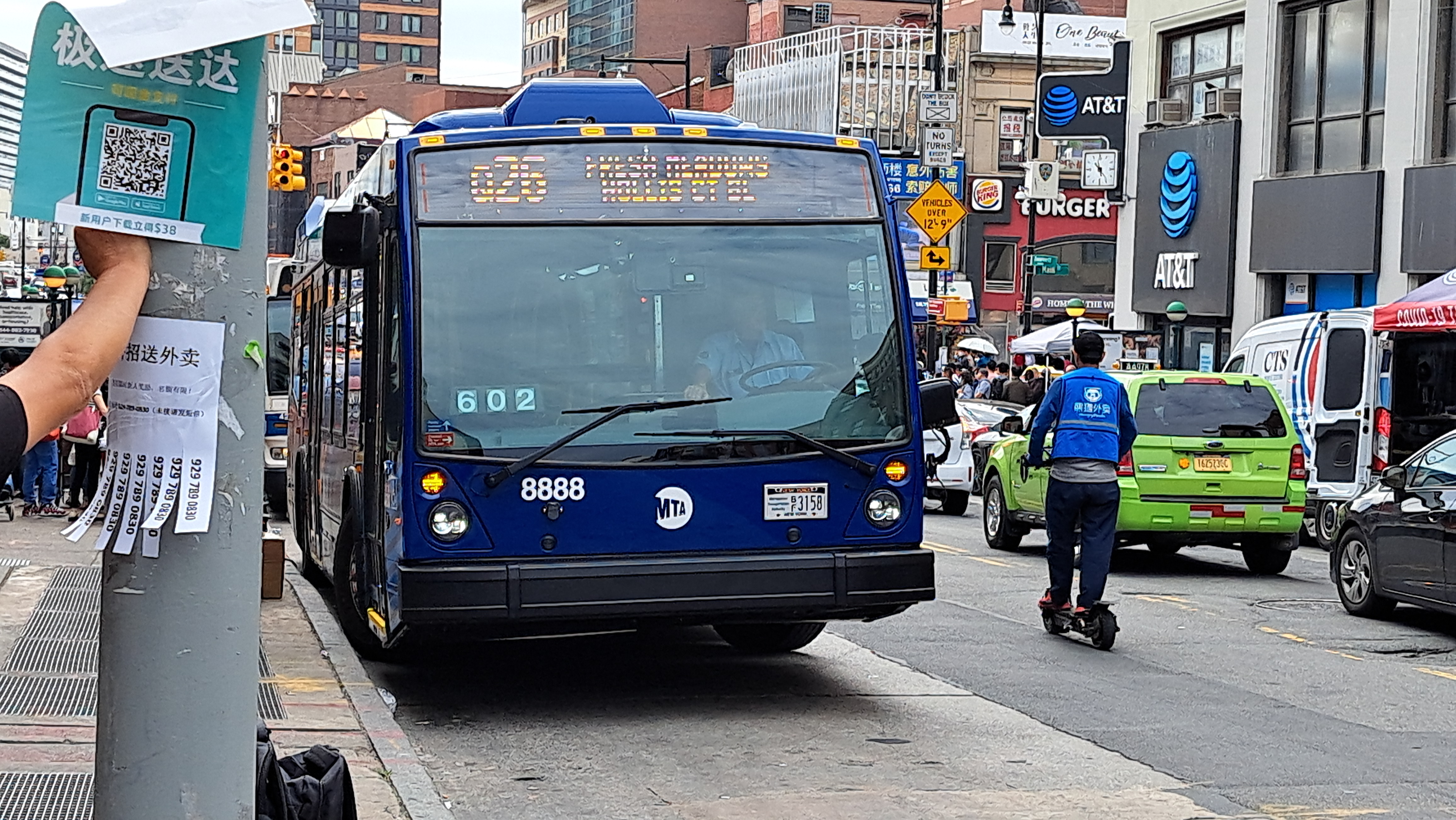
A 2022 Nova LFS (8888) on the Fresh Meadows-bound Q26 at Roosevelt Ave/Main St in 2022.

On November 29, 1956, the New York City Transit Authority (NYCTA) approved plans to cut the route back from Queens Village to the Horace Harding Expressway, and to redesignate the route from the Q26 Flushing-Queens Village route to the Q26 Flushing-46th Avenue route. Though the change was initially scheduled to take effect on January 22, 1957, it took effect on February 3, 1957. Service in the morning to Flushing after 7 a.m. started running every 40 minutes, and service from Flushing started running every ten minutes between 4:41 and 6:51 p.m., and every 20 minutes afterwards.

In 1990, the NYCTA proposed eliminating weekend service in June 1991 to reduce the agency's budget deficit. Q26 service was to be cut because it was one of the agency's worst performing local bus routes. Eliminating Saturday service would have affected 548 people and eliminating Sunday service would affect 200 people. The route had a farebox recovery ratio of 17.6% and 14.0% on Saturdays and Sundays, respectively, lower than the systemwide averages of 41% and 38%. Cutting Saturday service was expected to save $76,001 and cutting Sunday service was expected to save $37,451.

Weekend and overnight service was discontinued on September 10, 1995 due to a budget crisis. The hours of Q26 service were changed to 5 a.m. to 12:45 a.m. on weekdays. In October 2004, the Metropolitan Transportation Authority (MTA) proposed cutting eight Queens bus routes, including the Q26, to fill a $436 million budget gap. The change would have taken effect in 2006. Due to criticism from politicians and riders, the elimination of the Q26 did not occur, with the agency electing to raise the fare instead. In December 2008, the MTA proposed entirely discontinuing the Q26 to help reduce the agency's $1.2 billion budget deficit. Had the plan been implemented, Q27 service would have been increased. Off-peak service was discontinued on June 27, 2010 due to another budget crisis, saving the agency $500,000 annually. The changes were planned to affect 550 daily riders, and increase an average rider's trip by five minutes. Rush hour service was maintained due to high demand. The change in service decreased cost efficiency and ridership, with many riders opting to drive instead of mass transit, and others using the Q27.

=== Bus redesign ===
In December 2019, the MTA released a draft redesign of the Queens bus network. As part of the redesign, the Q26 would have been replaced by a "subway connector" route called the QT31, which would have had a nonstop section along 46th Avenue. East of Francis Lewis Boulevard, QT31 would also run along the Horace Harding Expressway and Springfield Boulevard to the Queens Village station. The redesign was delayed due to the COVID-19 pandemic in New York City in 2020, and the original draft plan was dropped due to negative feedback.

A revised plan was released in March 2022. Under the new plan, the Q26 would have overnight service restored and become a "zone" route, which would have a nonstop section on 46th Avenue. The Q26 would be extended south on Francis Lewis Boulevard, east on 73rd Avenue, and south on Springfield Boulevard to Cambria Heights, taking over the Q27's route in southeast Queens.

A final bus-redesign plan was released in December 2023. The Q26 would continue to terminate at Hollis Court Boulevard and Francis Lewis Boulevard at its south end, with off-peak service ending at 47th Avenue-Hollis Court Boulevard, but the north end would be extended along College Point Boulevard to College Point in order to replace the Q65. The Q26 would also be converted into a full-time local bus route. As with the draft plan, there would be 24/7 service on the Q26, albeit only between Flushing and College Point.

On December 17, 2024, addendums to the final plan were released. Among these, bus stops on the Q26 were rearranged. On January 29, 2025, the current plan was approved by the MTA Board, and the Queens Bus Redesign went into effect in two different phases during Summer 2025. The Q26 is part of Phase I, which started on June 29, 2025, and it became an MTA Bus Company route on that date.

== See also ==
- List of bus routes in Queens
- Q27 (New York City bus)
