= Z & M Coach Company =

American bus operator

The Z & M Coach Company operated public buses in Queens, New York City. It was established in 1926. Its operations (and other public bus operations) were taken over by the New York City Board of Transportation, which was superseded by the New York City Transit Authority in 1953.

== History ==
The Z & M Coach Company was incorporated on August 19, 1926, by Frederick M. Zander. The company's first route, later the Q27, started in October 1928 to connect the subway in Flushing at Main Street and Amity Street to the Rosewood section of Bayside. Zander was fined $25 twice in November for operating the route without a license. He continued operating the service despite the order to stop service until he obtained a permit for it. Rosewood residents banded together to raise money and hire the bus like a taxi to allow service to continue. The bus route was supported by the Rosewood Improvement Association and the East Flushing Civic Association. The route originally operated between Flushing and the Horace Harding Expressway, and was known as the Flushing—Rosewood route.

In 1931, the New York City Board of Estimate was deciding which bus route franchises would be given to which private operators. Along with thirty other bus routes, the Q27 was tentatively assigned to the North Shore Bus Company, as part of Zone B (Flushing and Northern Queens).

In 1932, the company operated a route from Flushing to Queens Village, which was divided into two five-cent fare zones. At the time, the franchise for the route was pending before the Board of Estimate. At the time, the company was not operating the Q27 to its eastern terminal named in the franchise contract. However, this was not viewed as a significant breach in the contract since that area was largely unpopulated, and since no riders ride the full length of the route.

As of March 1, 1933, Z & M Coach Corporation used six buses on its Q27 route and twelve buses on its unfranchised Flushing to Queens Village route. At the time, the Q27 was not operated to its eastern terminal.

Z & M obtained a one-year franchise to the route on December 30, 1932. On May 2, 1933, the New York State Transit Commission granted the company a certificate of public convenience and necessity for the route for the duration of the franchise. New York City granted the company another franchise for the Q27 and a franchise for the new Q26 route on April 26, 1935, for a period beginning at the end of the first contract, and ending no later than December 31, 1938. On November 9, 1936, the operation of these routes was transferred to the North Shore Bus Company. On that same date, the company started operating the Q1 and Q32, which had been operated by North Shore. Between December 31, 1936, and April 27, 1937, the company operated a route running between the Kew Gardens–Union Turnpike subway station and 165th Street and Shelton Avenue in Jamaica. In 1938, eleven new buses were placed into service.
