= North Shore Bus Company =

Bus company in New York City (1920–1947)

The North Shore Bus Company operated public buses in Queens, New York City. It was established in 1920 as the successor to the New York and North Shore Traction Company trolley system, and operated until 1947 when it went bankrupt, and its operations were taken over by the New York City Board of Transportation.

== History ==
=== Origin: New York and North Shore Traction Company ===
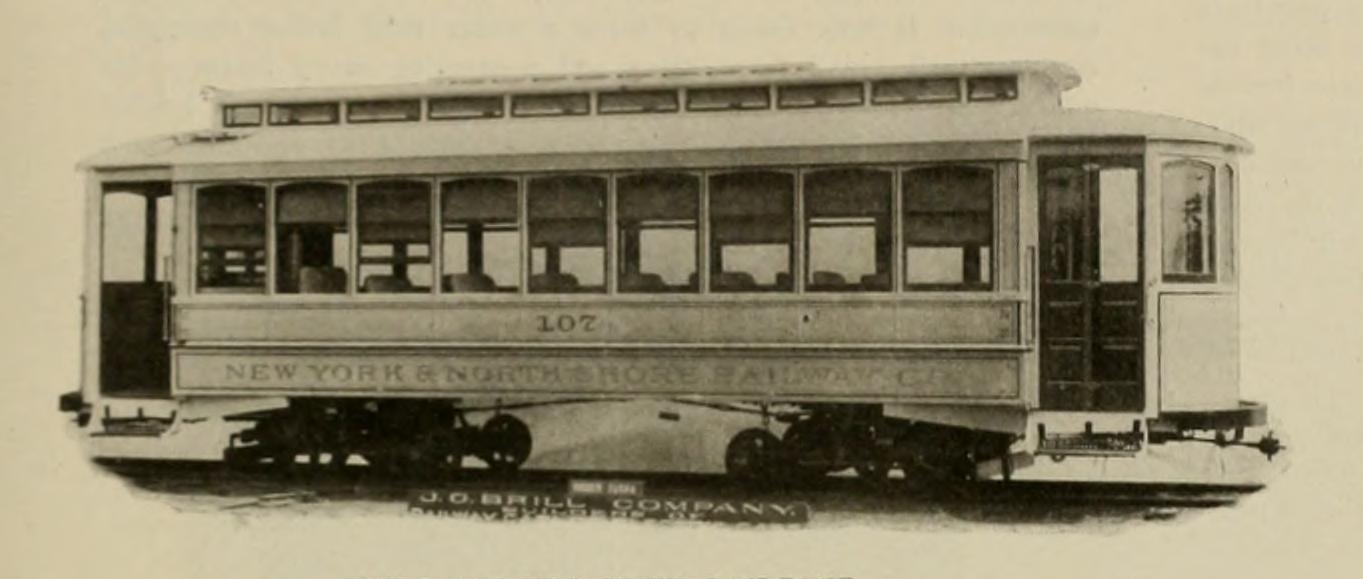
1891 coverage of a former NY&NST streetcar.

The company was established in 1902 as a trolley company called the Mineola, Roslyn & Port Washington Traction Company, but as it grew into Queens it was renamed in 1907 as the "New York and North Shore Traction Company." It had a line from Flushing, Queens to Roslyn in Nassau County named the North Shore Line, as well as another from Flushing to Whitestone–14th Avenue Station on the Whitestone Branch of the Long Island Rail Road, better known as the Whitestone Line. Within Nassau County, it had lines from Port Washington to Mineola which was known as the Port Washington Line, and from Mineola to Hicksville, called the Hicksville Line.

The trolley cars on this system were considered to be the largest and most powerful on Long Island and in Queens. As powerful as they were, however, they still had difficulty climbing the hills of such areas as Douglaston and Manhasset.

=== Transition to buses ===
By the late-1910s many trolley systems began to decline, but rather than collapse or sell themselves to other companies, the NY&NST replaced their trolley cars with buses, the majority of which operated in Queens. The economic impact of the Great Depression forced them to sell off many of their routes to other companies during the 1930s, most notably to the Triboro Coach Corporation, one of the last surviving private bus lines in New York City. In spite of this, the company was still occasionally able to purchase routes from Bee Line, Incorporated in Nassau County. North Shore acquired the Flushing Heights Bus Corporation and its Q17 and Q25 routes on September 22, 1935, although that company was never merged into NSB.

On November 9, 1936, North Shore acquired the franchise to all bus routes in Zone B (Flushing and Northern Queens), except those operated by the New York and Queens Transit Corporation. The Q26 and Q27 were transferred to the North Shore Bus Company from Z & M Coach Company, while the Q1 and Q32 were transferred to Z & M. In addition, North Shore restored service to the Bayside West–Jamaica route, which had been discontinued a year earlier by S & C Buses.

On June 25, 1939, North Shore acquired the remaining Bee Line routes and Bee Line's 165th Street Bus Terminal in Jamaica, as part of the company's takeover of nearly all routes in Zone D (Jamaica and Southeast Queens). By the 1940s, North Shore operated nearly all the bus routes in Zone B (Flushing and Northern Queens) and Zone D.

On March 30, 1947, the company went bankrupt after its drivers and other employees went on strike. Its operations were taken over by the New York City Board of Transportation, which was superseded by the New York City Transit Authority in 1953.

== Depots ==
Prior to takeover by the city in 1947, the company based its operations out of two depots:

=== Flushing Depot ===
The Flushing Depot of the company was located on the south side of Roosevelt Avenue in Flushing Meadows–Corona Park in Queens, west of 126th Street and east of the New York City Subway's Corona Yard. This depot opened sometime in the 1900s, and housed buses serving northern Queens. It is now the Casey Stengel Depot under the MTA.

=== Jamaica Depot ===
The company's Jamaica Depot was located on the west side of Merrick Boulevard just south of Liberty Avenue in Jamaica, Queens. The depot lies between Merrick Boulevard to the east and 165th Street to the west, and spans about three blocks north-to-south between South Road and 107th Avenue, located across from the campus of York College. This depot, which housed buses serving the Jamaica and Southeastern Queens area, opened in 1939, and expanded in subsequent years following takeover, adding bus storage areas and a washing area. It is now the Jamaica Depot under the MTA.

For many years after the takeover, both of the depots were overcrowded with buses due to lack of storage space. In 1968, the MTA, which now ran the NYCTA, acquired land to build another depot, the Queens Village Depot, to relieve crowding at the other two depots. This depot, located at 97-11 222nd Street between 97th and 99th Avenues in Queens Village, Queens, west of Belmont Park, opened in 1974, which took a number of routes from the depots, mainly those serving the Queens Village and adjacent areas. However, despite this move, the Jamaica Depot was still overcrowded, since the capacity for that depot is 150 buses and is assigned 200 buses. As a result, the 50 additional buses at that depot park on surrounding streets. A project to rebuild the depot would begin in 2018, with all of its routes and buses temporarily sent to other depots.

== Bus routes ==
- Q1: Jamaica – Hillside Avenue – short lines (acquired from Bee Line)
- Q2: Jamaica – Hollis Avenue – Hempstead Avenue to Belmont Park (from Bee Line)
- Q3: Jamaica – Hollis – JFK Airport via Farmers Blvd. (from Bee Line)
- Q3A: Jamaica (Parsons Blvd. & Hillside Av.) – St. Albans – Cambria Heights via Murdock & 113 Av. (renumbered 1988 to Q83 by NYCTA), (from Bee Line)
- Q4: Jamaica – Cambria Heights via Merrick & Linden Blvds. (from Bee Line)
- Q4A: Jamaica – Laurelton via Merrick Blvd. & 120 Ave. (renumbered 1988 to Q84 by NYCTA) (from Bee Line)
- Q5: Jamaica – Rosedale & Green Acres Shopping Mall via Merrick Blvd. (from Bee Line)
- Q5A: Jamaica – Locust Manor LIRR – Springfield Gardens (renumbered 1988 to Q85 by NYCTA) (from Schenck Transportation)
- Q5AB: Jamaica – Rosedale via Rochdale Village and Bedell Street. (combined with Q5A into Q85 in 1988 by NYCTA), (from Schenck Transportation)
- Q5AS: Laurelton – Rosedale Shuttle (renumbered 1988 to Q86 by NYCTA, then eliminated in 1995 due to low ridership), (from Bee Line)
- Q12: Flushing – Little Neck via Sanford Av. & Northern Blvd.
- Q12A: Little Neck LIRR Station – Floral Park via Little Neck Parkway (renumbered to Q79 by NYCTA, then eliminated due to low ridership and reinstated via compromise as part of the extended Q36 in 2013) (1933)
- Q13: Flushing – Bayside – Fort Totten via Northern & Bell Blvds. (1933)
- Q14: Flushing – Whitestone (1933) (eliminated in 2010 due to budget cuts; subsequently replaced with the Q15A route)
- Q15: Flushing – Whitestone – Beechhurst (1933)
- Q16: Flushing – Clearview – Fort Totten via Bayside Avenue, Francis Lewis & Willets Point Blvds. or Utopia Pkwy. (1933)
- Q17: Flushing – 188 Street & Jamaica
- Q17A: Jamaica – Little Neck via Utopia Pkwy & Horace Harding Blvd. (renumbered 1988 to Q30 by NYCTA)
- Q17-20: Combination of Q17 and Q20 routes which operated in the 1940s and 1950s.
- Q20: Flushing – College Point Shuttle (renumbered to Q44FS, then to Q20 in 1990, then to Q20A & Q20B in 1999 by NYCTA, and extended to Jamaica)
- Q23: 108th Street, Corona-Ditmars Avenue (before 1933); originally North Shore, transferred first to Kings Coach Company (1931??), then to Triboro Coach Corporation in 1936?, then to MTA Bus Company in 2005
- Q26: Flushing – Auburndale via Hollis Court Blvd.
- Q27: Flushing – Rosewood – Queens Village & Cambria Heights via Springfield Blvd.
- Q28: Flushing – Bayside West (before 1933)
- Q31: Jamaica – Bayside West
- Q35: Flushing – College Point – Whitestone; substitute for LIRR Whitestone Branch; replaced by Q20 in 1937.
- Q32: Queens Village LIRR-Creedmoor shuttle.
- Q36: Jamaica – Floral Park via Hillside & Jamaica Avenues.
- Q42: Jamaica – Addisleigh Park via Sayres Av.
- Q43: Jamaica LIRR Station – Hillside Av. to City Line.
- Q44: Jamaica – Flushing – Bronx.
- Q44A: Union Turnpike – Kew Gardens – Lake Success & Glen Oaks (renumbered 1990 to Q46 by NYCTA)
- Q44B: Malba Shuttle (eliminated 1990 due to low ridership)
- Q44VP: Union Turnpike – Kew Gardens & Vleigh Place Shuttle (renumbered 1990 to Q74 by NYCTA, then eliminated in 2010 due to budget cuts)
- Q48: Flushing – LaGuardia Airport began operating April 5, 1940
