= List of Ukrainian software companies =

List of software companies in Ukraine.

== TOP Ukrainian software companies for October 2025 ==
As of August 2025, the top 50 Ukrainian IT companies collectively employ about 79,600 specialists, with the top 25 accounting for the vast majority of these employees.

These companies span product and outsourcing models, covering everything from enterprise solutions, cybersecurity, and AI to mobile/web app development and game tech:

1. EPAM Systems
2. SoftServe
3. Ciklum
4. ELEKS
5. GlobalLogic
6. Luxoft
7. Mind Studios
8. Infopulse
9. DataArt
10. Yalantis
11. Fireart
12. N-iX
13. Intellias
14. Leobit
15. Genesis
16. Brights
17. Sigma Software
18. Ubisoft
19. Agiliway
20. Playtika
21. Playrix
22. Exoft
23. Capgemini Engineering
24. Innovecs
25. SKELAR
26. Brightgrove
27. QArea Company
28. QArea Company
29. Fulcrum Rocks
30. Cleveroad
31. Faster than Light
32. Kevych Solutions
33. Geniusee
34. Simform
35. Agile Engine
36. Empat
37. OAKS LAB
38. It Media
