= Ciklum =

Software company in United Kingdom

- Type: Private
- Industry: Software engineering, IT consulting
- Founded: 2002.
- Headquarters: London, United Kingdom,
- Area served: International
- Services: Custom Software Development
- Number of employees: 4,500.
- Website: ciklum.com

Ciklum is a software development and IT outsourcing company's founded in Denmark in 2002. It is headquartered in London, United Kingdom.

The company operates software development centers and offices in several countries, including India, United Kingdom, United States, United Arab Emirates, Spain, Switzerland, Denmark, Israel, Poland, Ukraine, and Pakistan.

== Social responsibility and educational initiatives ==
Ciklum has participated in several educational and social initiatives in Ukraine.

In 2011, Ciklum participated in the establishment of BIONIC Hill Innovation Park - a Ukrainian innovation park constructed similarly to the Silicon Valley.

In 2012, Ciklum co-launched BIONIC University, the first Ukrainian intercorporate IT university working on the premises of National University of Kyiv-Mohyla Academy. The initiative focused on IT education and training in cooperation with academic institutions in Ukraine.

In 2014, the company participated in the launch of the Brain Basket Foundation, an initiative aimed at supporting IT education and workforce development in Ukraine.

In 2018, Ciklum supported the establishment of Ukraine House in Davos during the World Economic Forum.

== Services ==
Ciklum provides software development and IT consulting services, including application development and quality assurance.

== History ==
Ciklum was founded in 2002 by Danish entrepreneur Torben Majgaard in Kyiv, Ukraine. By the late 2010s, the company employed several thousand people across multiple countries.

In 2017, Michael Boustridge was appointed CEO.

In 2019, Ciklum raised a new investment led by Dragon Capital with AVentures Capital co-investment.

Following the Russian invasion of Ukraine in 2022, the company reported operational adjustments while continuing its business activities in the region. In addition, Ciklum continued to develop the from Patriots to Patriots program for donations from employee income.

In April 2023, Rajaram Radhakrishnan became chief executive officer of the company.

== Acquisitions ==
In 2009, Ciklum acquired the main business activities of Mondo following its bankruptcy.

In 2011, Ciklum acquired 50% of SCR Gruppen (Denmark).

In 2013, Ciklum acquired Danish IT outsourcing provider Kuadriga.

In 2015, the Ukrainian Redevelopment Fund associated with George Soros acquired a significant minority stake in the company.

== See also ==
- Softserve
- Eleks
- Infopulse Ukraine
- DataArt
