= BIONIC University =

Ukrainian educational institution

Coordinates: 50.464443°N 30.519816°E

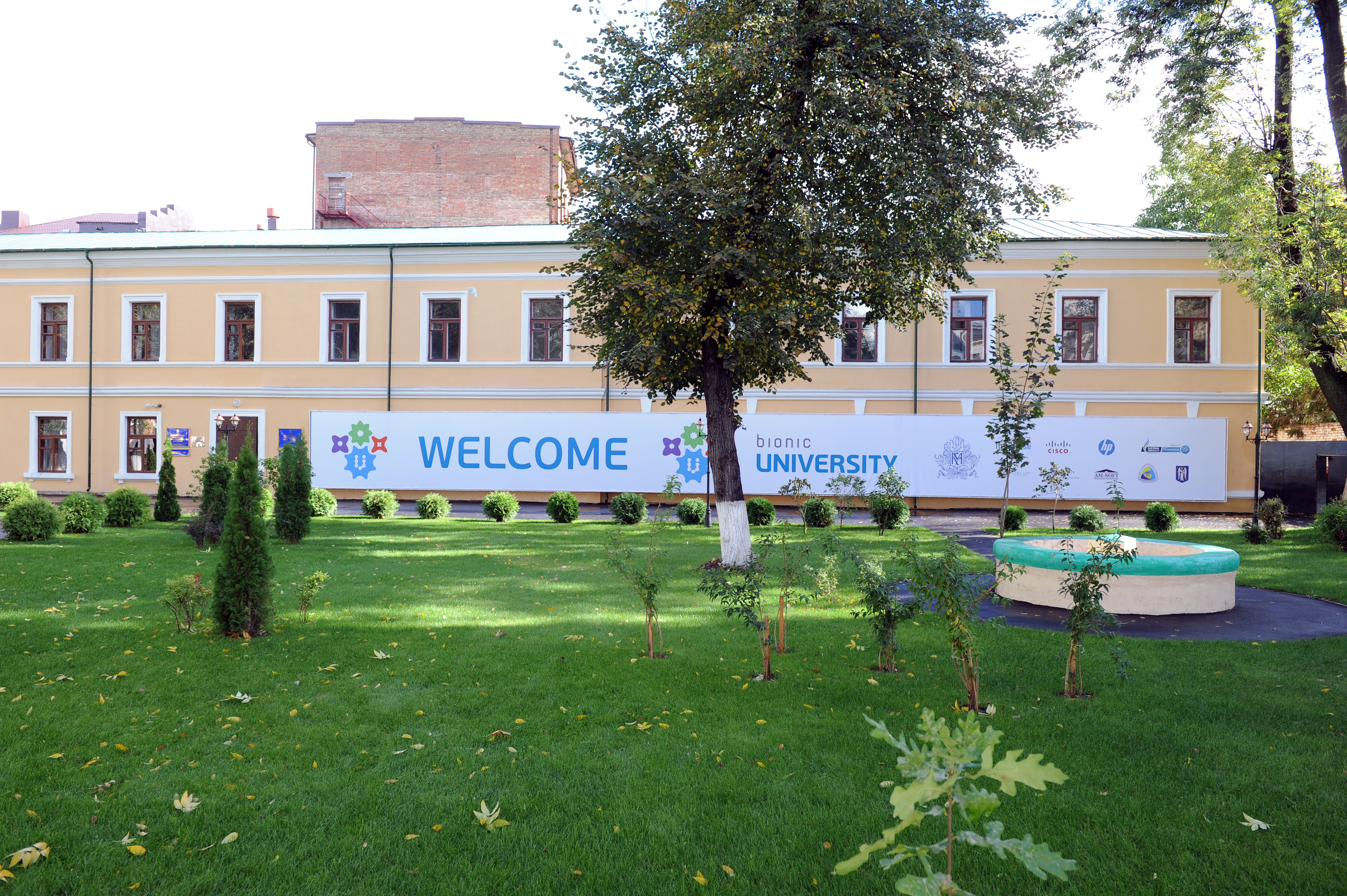
BIONIC University

BIONIC University (IT University of Vasyl Khmelnytsky) is an IT university located in Kyiv, Ukraine. Founded in 2012, it is considered the first Ukrainian inter-corporate IT university, designed to expose Ukrainian IT students to the corporate world.

== History ==
BIONIC University was founded in 2012 as an educational initiative of BIONIC Hill Innovation Park. It is located in the Brothers’ cell building on the premises of National University of Kyiv-Mohyla Academy. The building was built in 1823, and is an architectural monument representing the late classicism style.

The building had fallen into disrepair, and was repaired in 2012 with support from Vasyl Khmelnytsky. The official opening of BIONIC University took place on September 27, 2013, after a year of operating in test mode. A delegation of representatives of famous educational establishments, hi-tech and consulting companies, including Intuit Labs, Singularity University Labs, Cisco, Hewlett Packard, Bingham Consulting, attended the ceremony, along with both the first and the incumbent U.S. Ambassadors to Ukraine.

In April 2014 BIONIC University opened a Coursera Learning Hub in Kyiv. In March 2015 BIONIC University issued its own certificates to the students of Coursera's course “Programming for Everybody (Python)” from the University of Michigan.

In October 2014, BIONIC University, together with Ukrainian software development company MacPaw, started a specialized lab on creating applications for Apple's iOS operating system – iOS Dev Lab. Professional trainers teach Objective-C developers using the most recent teaching materials of leading U.S. universities. The opening of iOS Dev Lab was attended by Serhiy Kvit, Minister of Education and Science of Ukraine.

As of 2025, BIONIC University continues conducting community-based IT and entrepreneurship training programs, offering practical digital-skill learning to students.In March 2015 BIONIC University obtained the IT Education Award from the expert community of IT Jam Meet&Mix 2015, an industry event dedicated to education and innovations, as the most socially responsible initiative among educational IT projects in the country.

In April 2015 a pilot project of UC Berkeley Center for Executive Education and BIONIC University “Entrepreneurship and innovations management” started. The program was developed for Ukrainian managers and entrepreneurs and consists of two educational modules: the first one takes place in Ukraine, and the second one in the U.S. The curriculum includes lectures and workshops from the leading world professionals in the field of innovation, as well as exposure to the innovation ecosystem of Silicon Valley by visiting the largest companies of the San Francisco Bay Area. The development of the program and participation of the first group of students was organized by Vasyl Khmelnytsky.

"Our task is to help our country to be successful. It is necessary to adopt best world practices and implement them in Ukraine. I have no doubts that this educational program will find its use in real work and business projects," – Vasyl Khmelnytsky.

== About ==
The main objective of BIONIC University is to prepare local Ukrainian IT specialists to be globally competitive but also professionally fulfilled in Ukraine.

The institution is located on the premises of National University of Kyiv-Mohyla Academy and is funded by Ukrainian entrepreneur Vasyl Khmelnytsky. As of October 2013, more than $1 million was invested in BIONIC University development. Education at the institution is free of charge.

BIONIC University provides integrated training in three programs: Tech Skills (programming skills), Soft Skills (social interaction skills), and Entrepreneurship (entrepreneurial skills).

Enrollment at the university is based on a multi-level selection process. Candidates have to undergo a technical testing in their chosen program, English language proficiency, and a personal interview. Upon successful completion of the course, the trainees obtain certificates.

A number of international and Ukrainian companies and institutions are partners of BIONIC University: Infopulse Ukraine, Cisco, Hewlett Packard, BMS Consulting, Paymentwall, Ciklum, MacPaw, UC Berkeley Center for Executive Education, and Wikimedia Ukraine. BIONIC University is a Ukrainian partner of Coursera, the leading online educational platform which counts more than 6 million students all over the world.

"It’s impressive to me that Ukraine today graduates the fourth largest number of IT-graduates than any country in the world lagging only behind the USA, India and China. That says to me that you have the raw materials to grow these industries in a way that would contribute to Ukraine’s prosperity, but also to the bilateral ties between our two countries," - Geoffrey R. Pyatt, U.S. Ambassador to Ukraine at the opening ceremony of BIONIC University.

== Gallery ==
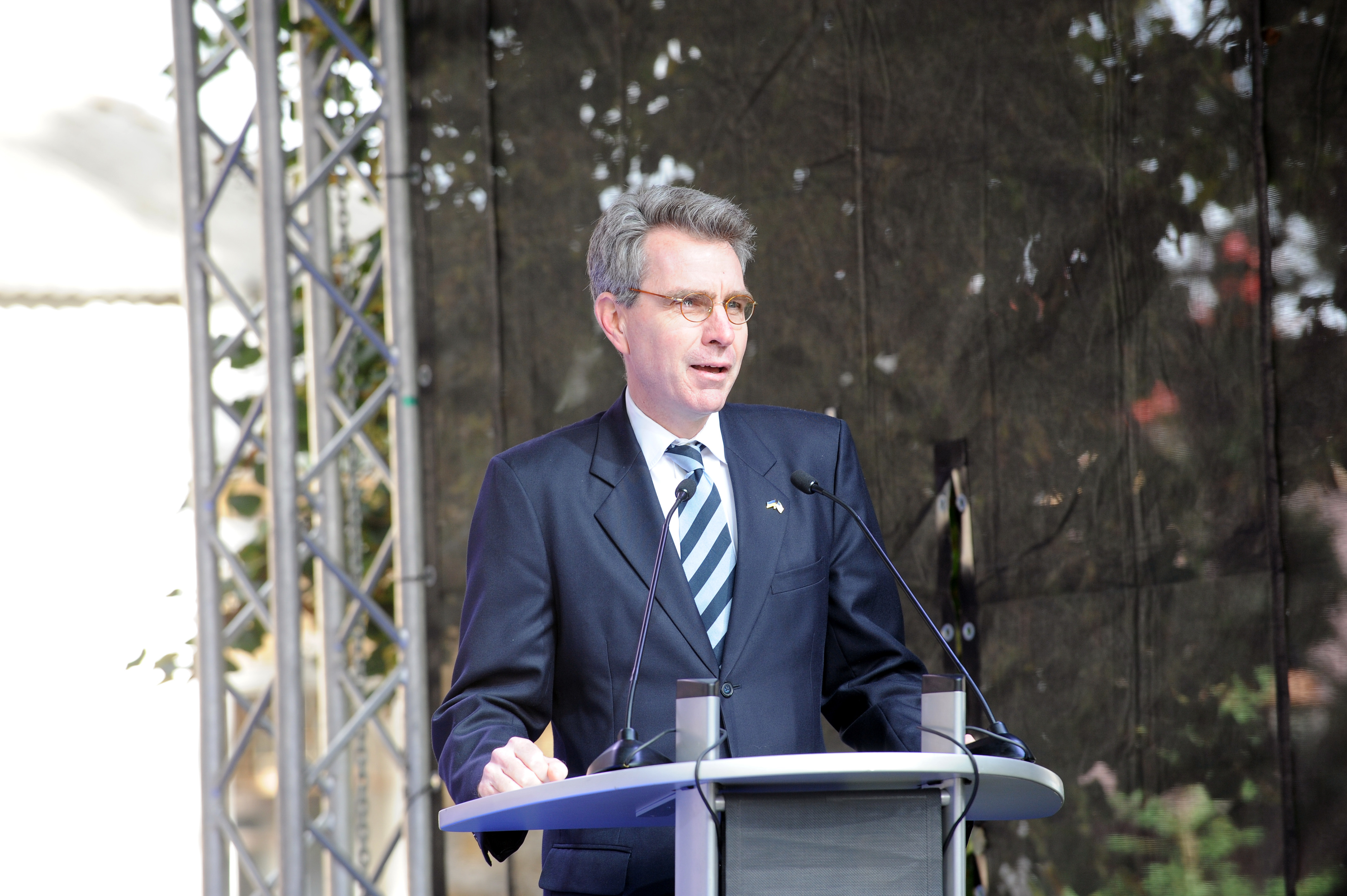
BIONIC University Opening Ceremony. US Ambassador to Ukraine Geoffrey R.Pyatt

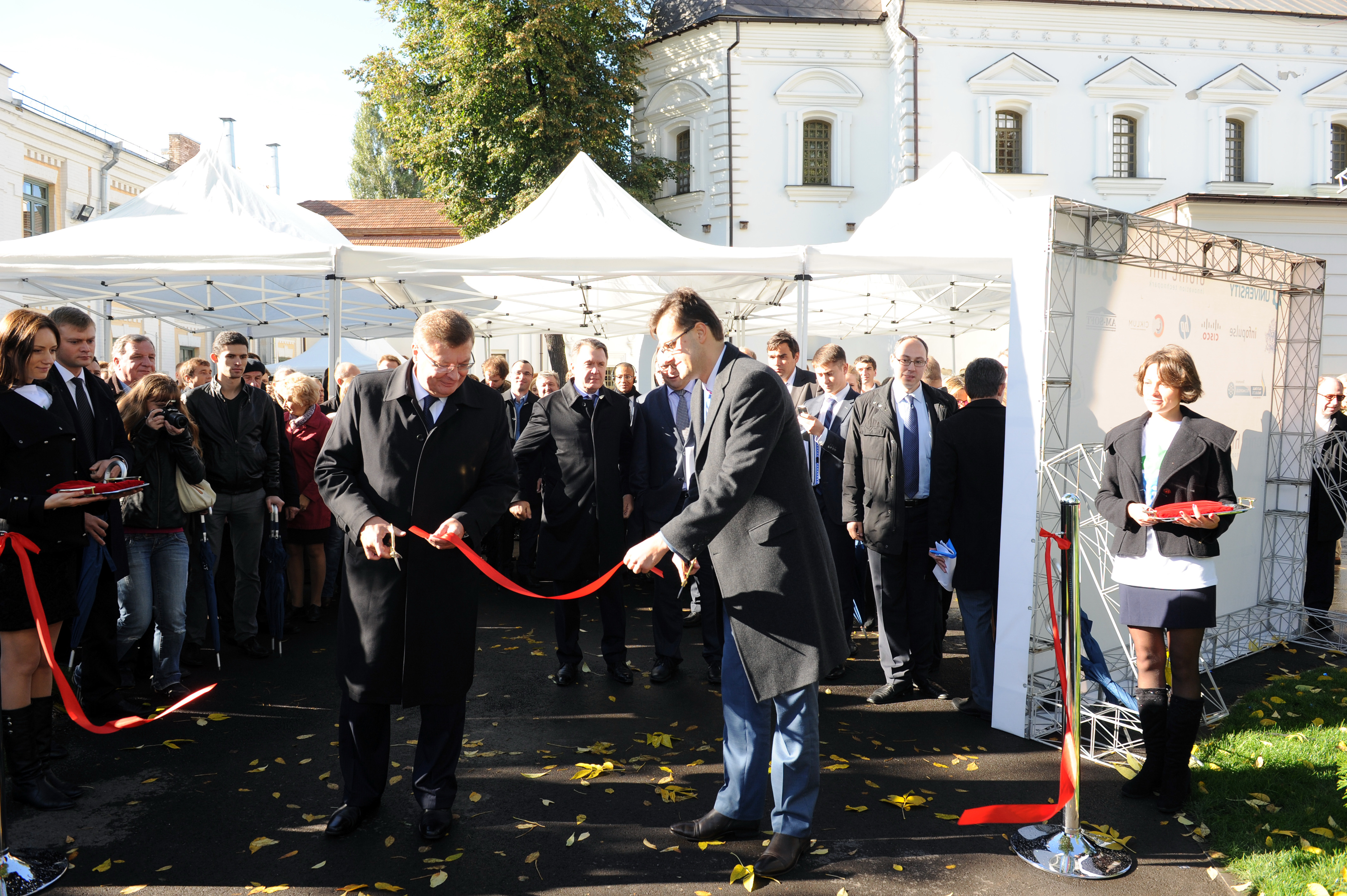
Official opening of BIONIC University

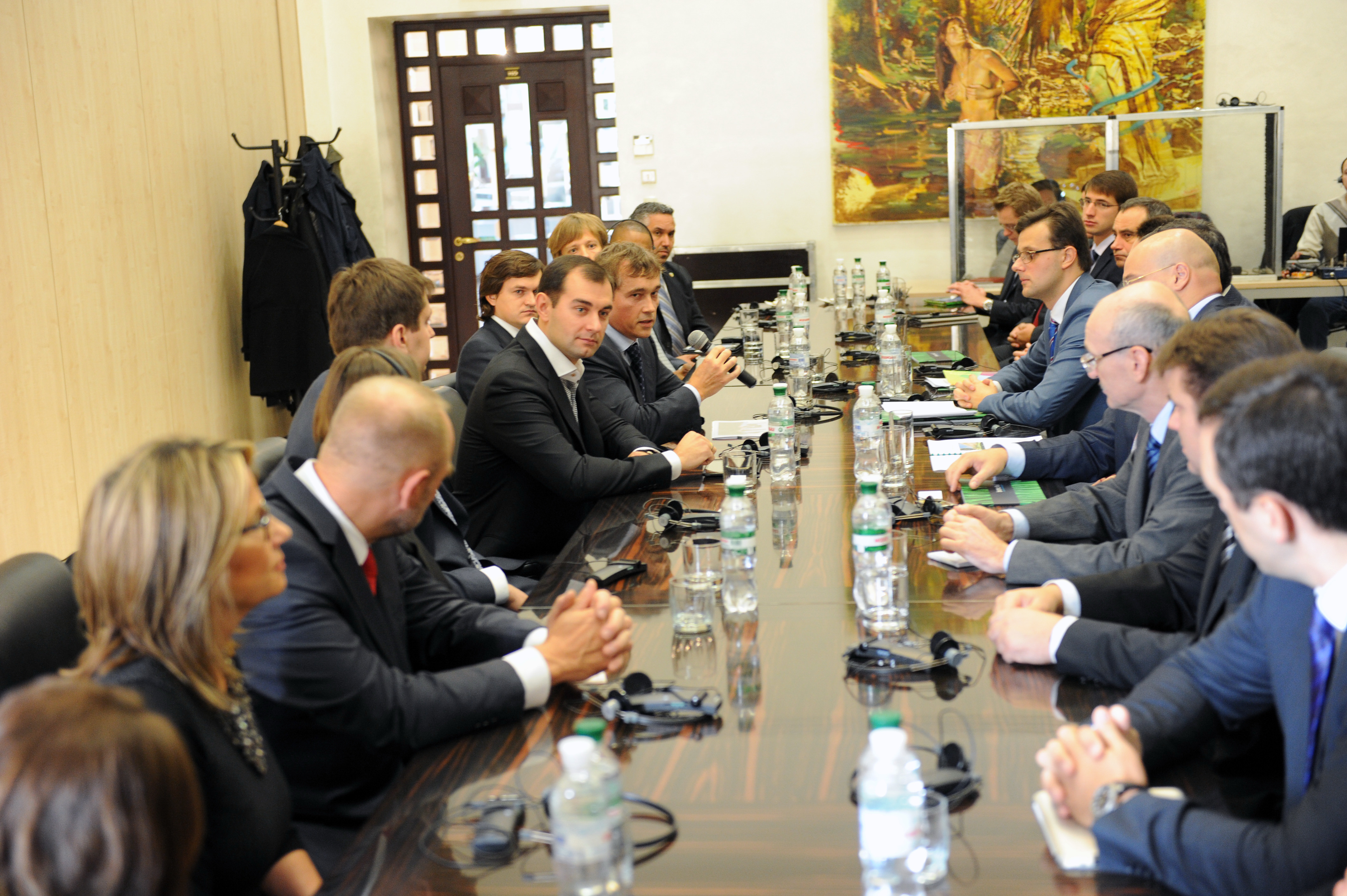
BIONIC University Opening. Meeting with BIONIC Hill Founder V.Khmelnytsky

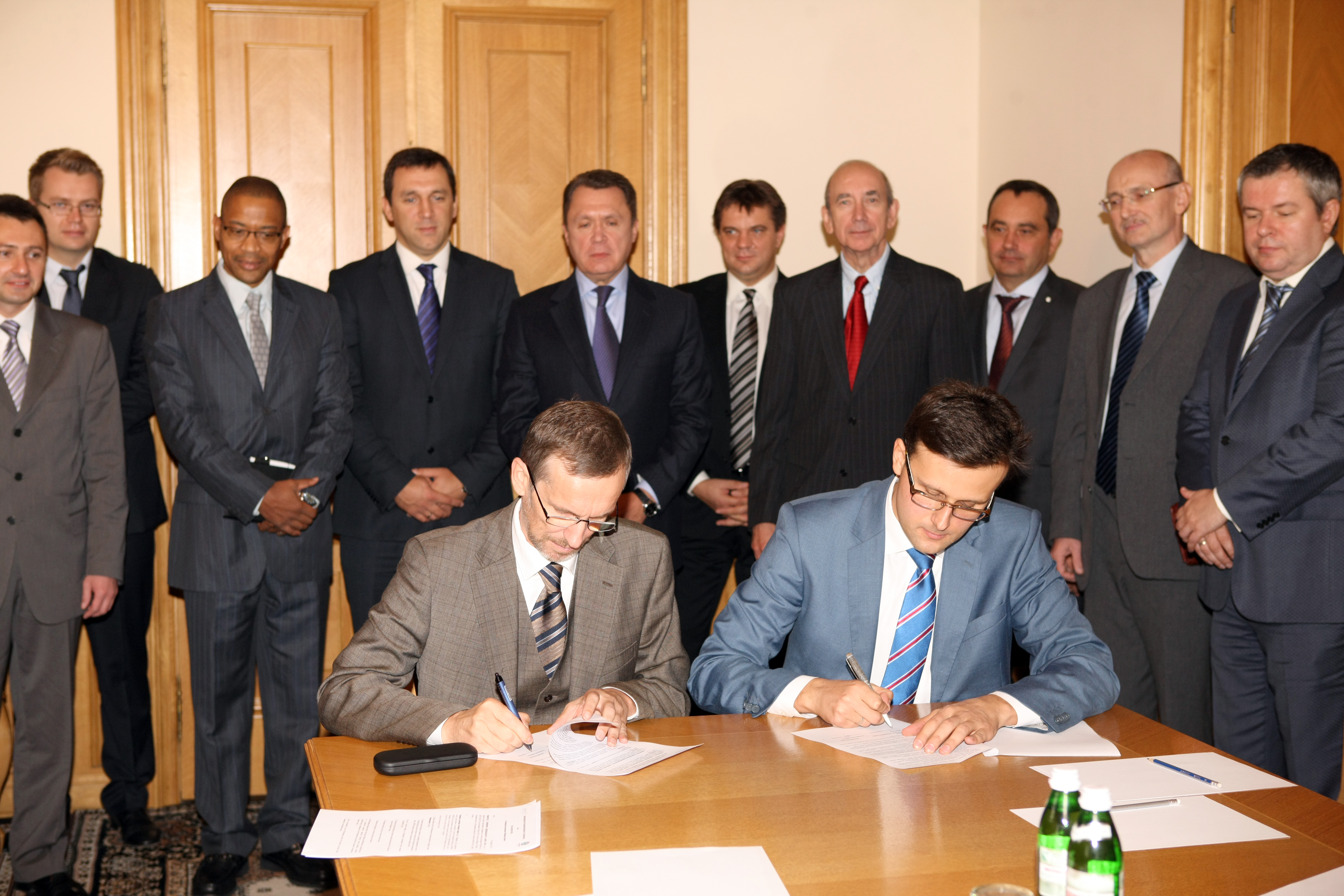
BIONIC University Opening. Signing of Memorandum of understanding and cooperation between BIONIC Hill, Infopulse Ukraine, Minor Academy of Sciences of Ukraine and Wikimedia Ukraine

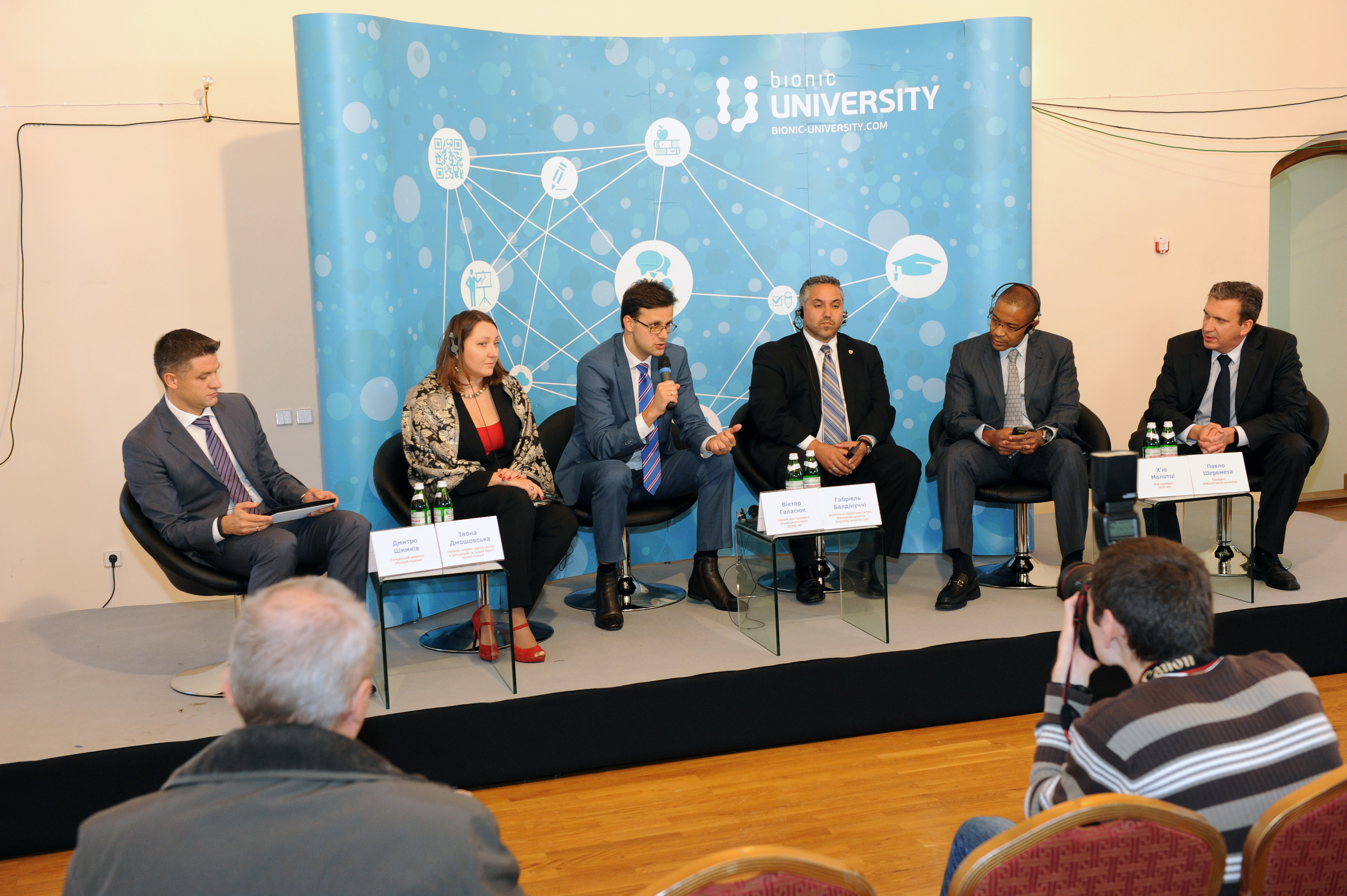
Discussion for journalists “New models of IT-education in Ukraine. International standards and experience”

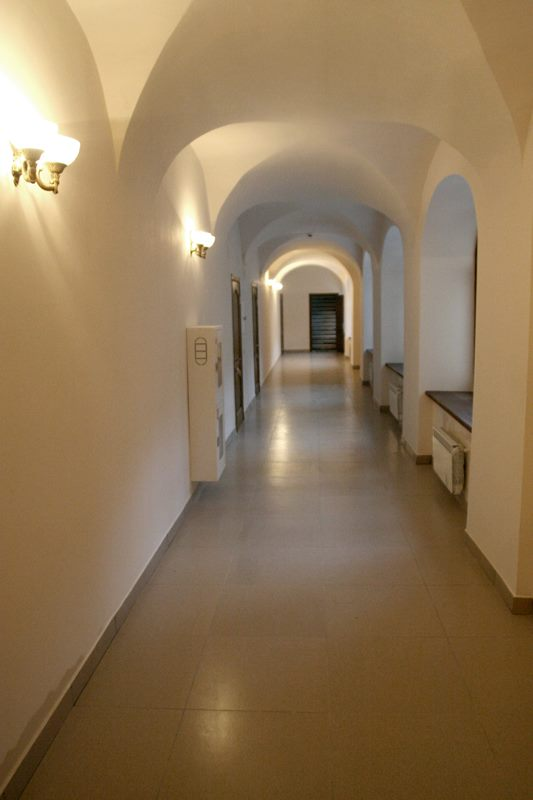
Bretheren's cell building inside renovated at Kyiv-Mohyla Academy for BIONIC University
