= SoftServe =

Ukrainian information technology company

Coordinates: 49°48′42.50″N 23°59′20.50″E

SoftServe, Inc.

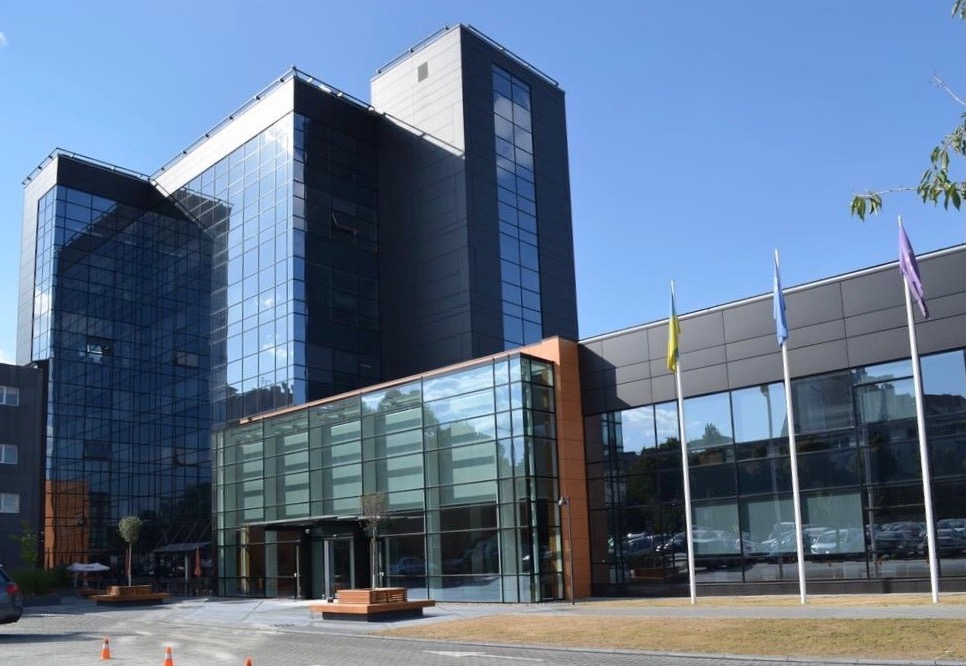
- Office in Lviv (2015)
- Type: Private
- Industry: Information technology and software development
- Founded: 1993; 33 years ago
- Headquarters: Austin, Texas (Global)
- Number of locations: 54 offices in 17 countries (2026)
- Area served: Worldwide
- Key people: Alex Chubay (CTO, CDO); Andriy Stytsyuk (CEO); Adriyan Pavlykevych (CISO); Volodymyr Semenyshyn (CRO); Paolo Emilio Testa (CPO); Keth Rozmus (Chief Global Sales Officer); Vasyl Malchyk (Head of Legal); Yuriy Stohniy (Head of Administration); Board of Directors; Yaroslav Lyubinets (COB); Taras Kytsmey (MOB); Chris Baker (MOB); Harry Propper (MOB); Yura Vasylyk (MOB); Taras Vervega (MOB); Vilnis Ezerins (MOB); Oleh Denys (MOB)
- Services: Artificial intelligence; Agentic engineering; Business process automation; Cloud computing; Data; Internet of things; Cybersecurity; Research and development; Robotics and automation; Physical AI; Experience platforms; Extended reality; Digital engineering; Digital strategy and innovation
- Number of employees: 10,000
- Divisions: Hoverstate; NewVision Software
- Subsidiaries: SoftServe, LLC
- Website: softserveinc.com

SoftServe, Inc., founded in 1993 in Lviv, Ukraine, is a global AI and technology services company. The company is headquartered in Austin, Texas, and employs more than 10,000 people across 54 offices in 17 countries. It is one of the largest employers of software developers in Eastern Europe, and one of the largest IT companies originating from Ukraine.

== History ==
=== Early years ===
SoftServe was founded in 1993 in Lviv, Ukraine. Started by two post-graduate students of Lviv Polytechnic, it began as a software development company with headquarters in Lviv. The company was initially supported by the Rensselaer Polytechnic Institute Incubator Center and its first known client was General Electric. The company opened its first office in the United States in 2000. SoftServe was instrumental in building Microsoft Bird's Eye service in 2004. It used the same concept that was later used by Google for its Google Street View. For its work on the project, SoftServe was invited to speak at Microsoft's annual conference where it was used as an example of business applications that could be built by technology corporations.

=== Expansion and educational initiatives ===
In 2006, SoftServe founded SoftServe University, its corporate learning and development organization. It provides technical, business and leadership training, language and cross-cultural communication courses, and support for professional certification.

SoftServe University operates across the company's international locations, with learning programs available in Ukraine, Bulgaria, Poland, Romania, Chile, Mexico and Colombia. The company also cooperates with universities on educational initiatives and technology training.

In 2008, SoftServe co-founded Lviv Business School at Ukrainian Catholic University.

=== Growth and acquisitions ===
SoftServe opened its United States headquarters in Fort Myers, Florida in 2008 and began holding an annual conference. By 2012, SoftServe was one of the largest IT outsourcing companies in Ukraine with 2,189 employees, third only to EPAM Systems and Luxoft.

In 2014 SoftServe moved its United States headquarters from Florida to One Congress Plaza, in Austin, Texas (The company had previously operated an office out of Austin since 2013 and officially moved its headquarters to One Congress Plaza in 2014.) By 2014, SoftServe opened offices in London, Amsterdam and Stockholm, and expanded its development operations in Poland and Bulgaria. The same year its employee base climbed to 3,900 employees.

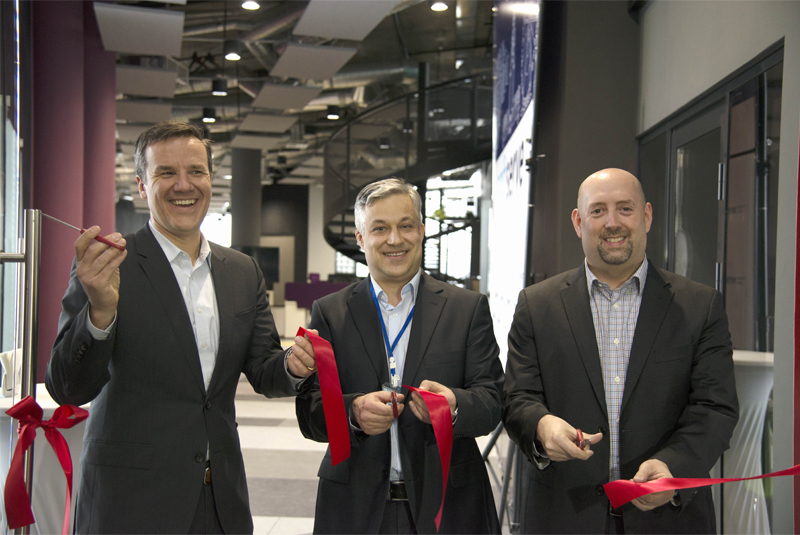
SoftServe executives open new offices in Kharkiv (2016)

In 2015 SoftServe opened a new European headquarters in Lviv, Ukraine. The same year the company named Chris Baker as the new CEO, taking over the role from Co Founder Taras Kytsmey.

SoftServe logo used from 2017 to 2026

In 2021, SoftServe surpassed 10,000 employees. In 2022, the company expanded its international development network into Latin America, opening development centers in Mexico and Colombia and expanding into Chile, while also launching operations in Romania.

Acquisitions:

- 2014 – Amsterdam-based technology services firm Initium Consulting Group BV.
- 2014 – European IT firm UGE UkrGermanEnterprise GmbH.
- 2017 – Wrocław-based Coders Center.
- 2023 – US-based digital agency Hoverstate, which focuses on mobile and web-based solutions and has operations in the United States and Italy.
- 2026 – India-based technology services firm NewVision Software, adding capabilities in agentic assurance, product engineering and intelligent managed services.

== Cyberattack and security response ==
In September 2020, the company was targeted by a ransomware attack, in response SoftServe shut down many of its internal systems to contain the incident. The company said there was no evidence that the attack had spread to customers' systems, and most internal systems were restored within hours or days. The breach resulted in portions of unfinished customer source code and other information being published online. The individual claiming responsibility, using the name Freedomf0x, also published fragmented personal information to about 200 individuals, although it was unclear whether they were SoftServe employees. The attack exploited the Windows customization tool Rainmeter. Following the breach, SoftServe partnered with cybersecurity and data-security firms and introduced additional security policies.

In 2025, SoftServe received a SOC 2 Type II report following an independent audit conducted by Ernst & Young. The examination was conducted under standards established by the American Institute of Certified Public Accountants.

== Products, services and partnerships ==
SoftServe is a digital engineering and technology services company with a focus on artificial intelligence, data and cloud computing. It provides services to clients in industries including high technology, retail and consumer packaged goods, financial services, energy, healthcare and manufacturing. SoftServe has continuing partnerships with: Amazon Web Services, Google Cloud, Microsoft, Cisco, Salesforce, Apigee, and other organizations.

SoftServe became an NVIDIA partner in 2020 and has subsequently received four consecutive NVIDIA Partner Network awards in different categories.

In 2023, SoftServe launched its Generative AI Lab, now known as the AI Lab, an initiative focused on research and development of generative AI applications and their adoption in enterprise environments.

== Social responsibility ==
In 2014, SoftServe established the Open Eyes corporate charity fund to support charitable projects and employee volunteering. Following Russia's full-scale invasion of Ukraine in 2022, the fund focused on humanitarian and medical assistance, education, and support for Ukrainian defenders. Since the start of the full-scale invasion, SoftServe has allocated more than UAH 4 billion to support Ukraine. By mid-2026, the Open Eyes fund had delivered more than 420 ambulances and 130 electronic warfare systems to more than 260 Ukrainian military units. The fund has also cooperated with Ukrainian rock band Okean Elzy on fundraising initiatives supporting the Ukrainian military and medical evacuation efforts.

In 2021, SoftServe launched the OpenTech crowdsourcing platform, through which employees and IT Academy students develop pro bono digital solutions for non-profit organizations, public institutions and social initiatives. Projects have involved organizations including UNICEF, UNFPA, WWF and Paso Pacífico.

In 2023, SoftServe launched EmpowerU, a global educational initiative providing free IT training to underrepresented and vulnerable groups, including veterans, refugees, people with disabilities and women from disadvantaged communities. The program was launched in Bulgaria, Chile, Colombia, Mexico, Ukraine, Poland and Romania. SoftServe joined the United Nations Global Compact in 2021 and remains an active participant.

== Awards and recognition ==
Since 2004, SoftServe has been a member of the Microsoft Partner Ecosystem and was a finalist for the global Microsoft Partner of the Year in both 2006 and 2007. The company was recognized for the same award in 2008 and 2009 in Eastern Europe. SoftServe has continued to receive recognition from Microsoft, including by Microsoft Ukraine in 2012 for Partner of the Year, for Innovation in Business Analytics.

The company has won additional awards throughout the industries, including being named to the Global Outsourcing 100 list in 2010, 2011, 2013, 2014, 2015 and 2016. In 2010 SoftServe was named as Ukraine's Best Employer by Hewitt Associates and in 2011 named as Best Employer in Eastern Europe. In 2019, SoftServe ranked seventh out of more than 130 Western European companies in the Clutch software development category. In 2023, SoftServe was positioned as a Challenger in Gartner's Magic Quadrant for Custom Software Development Services and received NVIDIA's Outstanding Impact Partner of the Year award. In 2024, the company was again positioned as a Challenger in the Gartner 'Magic Quadrant and received NVIDIA's Consulting Partner of the Year award in EMEA.

In 2025, SoftServe ranked 46th on Glassdoor's Best-Led Companieslist in the United States, received NVIDIA's Service Delivery Partner of the Year award in the Americas.

In 2026, SoftServe received NVIDIA's Partner of the Year award in the Energy/Utilities category in the Americas. SoftServe Systems Ltd was also certified as a Great Place to Work in the United Kingdom.

== See also ==
- Ciklum
- DataArt
- Eleks
- Infopulse Ukraine
