= Outsourcing in Ukraine =

Outsourcing in Ukraine is a widely used service in Ukraine. Most often, outsourcing services are provided in the Information Technology (IT) sphere, but they are also popular in the areas of logistics, marketing services, recruiting, accounting, processing and systematization of information, medical services, administration, and others.

== IT outsourcing ==
IT outsourcing is the practice of hiring an external service provider to deliver some of the IT projects and functions required by a business that it cannot fulfill with internal resources. Common services include managing infrastructure, directing strategy, business process management, software development, and running a service desk.

Ukraine has a long-standing reputation as a major technology region, with a well-developed scientific and educational base. In March 2013, Ukraine ranked fourth in the world by number of certified IT professionals after the United States, India and Russia.

In 2017, Ukraine emerged as the top outsourcing destination of the year according to the Global Sourcing Association. By then, there were 13 Research and Development centers of global companies located in Ukraine. According to the IT sector report of 2019, Ukraine is the largest exporter of IT services in Europe and ranks among the 25 most attractive countries for software development worldwide. Particularly, Ukraine is a European leader in the number of outsourcing companies in the field of artificial intelligence.

According to research, 90% of Ukraine's IT services are outsourced to other countries. IT outsourcing is the most actively developing industry in the outsourcing services market, and Ukraine ranks second after India in terms of growth of this segment of IT in the world. As of 2019, the number of IT specialists involved in the IT industry of Ukraine reached 172,000 people. The number of IT professionals is expected to reach 200,000 by 2020.

The share of the IT industry in Ukraine's GDP is 4%. According to DOU's annual job market research, conducted by the end of each year, the IT sector in Ukraine has grown by 60%. It is clear that most of this percentage is IT outsourcing. In 2003, the IT outsourcing market in Ukraine amounted to $110 million, in 2007 $544 million, in 2011 $1.1 billion, and in 2014 it reached nearly $2.4 billion. In 2016, the IT sector of Ukraine became the third-largest export industry of the country, with $3.2 billion in services provided abroad. The total income of information technology sphere amounted to $2.48 billion in 2017. IT service export reached $3.6 billion in 2017. In 2020, the growth continued and the share of IT in exports has increased up to 8,29% in 2020. Compared to 2019, exports in 2020 increased by 20.4% and more than 853 M USD. By 2021, the volume exceeded $5 billion for the first time, and this is the biggest number in all previous years.

The main export markets for Ukrainian IT are the USA, Canada, Great Britain, Israel, UAE, Switzerland, Germany, Netherlands, Sweden, Denmark, Finland, Norway, Portugal, Spain, France, Austria, Singapore, South Korea, and India.

In 2015, Ukraine ranked 41st in the global outsource rating. In 2016–2017, Ukraine ranked 24th in the global outsource rating.

In 2021, BritishGlobal Sourcing Association announced Ukraine as the best country for outsourcing in its annual nomination.

Despite the challenges of war since 2022, the tech industry has shown significant adaptability. In 2023, Ukraine’s IT sector generated $6.7 billion in export revenue (42% of all service exports) and remained the country’s top export industry. As the national leader, Kyiv accounts for roughly 35% of Ukraine’s tech talent.

== Economic impact ==
The level of development of IT outsourcing in Ukraine allows to achieve positive macroeconomic effects that help the economic development of the country. In the long term, these effects are capable of causing structural transformations that will shape new trends in the Ukrainian economy. The effects of the development of IT outsourcing in our country include:

- improving the structure of the labour market;
- inflow of foreign currency and improvement of the balance of payments;
- increase of domestic demand in the consumer market;
- overcoming the stratification of the population and the formation of the middle class;
- strengthening the financial security of the state

== Ratings ==
The International Association of Outsourcing Professionals (IAOP) annually publishes the Global Outsourcing 100 ranking, which lists the top 100 outsourcing providers in the world. The rating is based on applications received and evaluated by an independent panel of judges from the IAOP. The main criteria for ranking are profitability, team growth, best projects, customer recommendations, corporate social responsibility and innovation in customer service delivery. In 2018, 18 Ukrainian outsourcing companies had been included in this ranking.

== Legal regulation ==
The concept of “outsourcing” in Ukrainian law has no definition, so it can be regulated solely in the context of analogy to certain legal rules. At the same time, the legislative field defines economic interaction through the conclusion of contracts, as well as the fact that everyone has the right to engage in business activities that are not prohibited by law. However, in the National Classifier of Ukraine, outsourcing is defined as an agreement according to which a customer delegates certain tasks to a contractor; in particular, part of the production process or the whole production process, provision of recruitment services, and support functions may be delegated.

According to Article 6 of the Civil Code of Ukraine, "The parties have the right to enter into an agreement that is not provided for by the acts of civil law, but is consistent with the general principles of civil law". In Article 627, this position is extended to include that "the parties are free to enter into a contract, select a contractor and determine the terms of the contract, taking into account the requirements of this Code, other acts of civil law, customs of business, the requirements of reasonableness and fairness." This allows the parties to determine the nature of the contract at their discretion and to include outsourcing work in it.

== See also ==
- List of Ukrainian software companies
