= List of IT consulting firms =

The following is a list of the largest notable information technology consulting firms in the world, along with their corporate headquarters location and the total number of consultants they have. Many of these serve primarily as third-party consultants and outsourcing partners. Many enterprise software companies employ their own consultants for services related to their own products. Among the corporations listed below, the number of consultants listed is less than their total number of employees. Note: Not all employees of these firms are consultants and firms with less than 10,000 employees are not included.

== By continent ==
=== Asia ===
Name	Headquarters	Total employees	As of
Tata Consultancy Services	Mumbai, India	614,795	March 2023
Infosys	Bengaluru, India	343,234	March 2023
Wipro	Bengaluru, India	256,921	March 2023
HCL Technologies	Noida, India	225,944	March 2023
birlasoft	Pune, India	12,193	March 2023
Tech Mahindra	Pune, India	152,400	March 2023
Hinduja Global Solutions	Bengaluru, India	21,685	December 2022
WNS Global Services	Mumbai, India	59,755	March 2023
ITC Infotech	Bengaluru, India	12,000	June 2021
NTT Data	Tokyo, Japan	195,100	March 2023
firstsource	Mumbai, India	23,018	March 2023
Fujitsu	Tokyo, Japan	124,216	March 2022
LTIMindtree	Mumbai, India	84,546	March 2023
Mphasis	Bengaluru, India	34,042	March 2023
Pactera	Dalian, China	23,954	
Neusoft Group	Shenyang, China	20,000	December 2020
L&T Technology Services	Vadodara, India	22,233	March 2023
Persistent Systems	Pune, India	22,598	March 2023
Cyient	Hyderabad, India	15,864	March 2023
KPIT Technologies	Pune, India	11,013	March 2023
Coforge	Noida, India	23,224	March 2023
Zensar Technologies	Pune, India	10,563	March 2023
NCS Group	Singapore	10,000	
iSoftStone	Beijing, China	85,470	December 2023

=== Europe ===
Name	Headquarters	Total employees	As of
Accenture	Dublin, Ireland	738,143	February 2023
Akkodis	Brussels, Belgium	50,000	August 2024
Alten	Boulogne-Billancourt, France	54,100	December 2022
Asseco	Rzeszów, Poland	32,400	January 2023
Atos	Bezons, France	110,270	March 2023
Capgemini	Paris, France	423,400	December 2025
Deloitte	London, United Kingdom	415,000	May 2022
Ernst & Young	London, United Kingdom	365,399	June 2022
Globant	Luxembourg, Luxembourg	27,500	September 2023
Grant Thornton International	London, United Kingdom	62,000	December 2022
Indra	Madrid, Spain	56,573	March 2023
KPMG	Amstelveen, Netherlands	273,424	September 2023
Luxoft	Zug, Switzerland	17,000	March 2023
Orange Business Services	Paris, France	29,100	December 2022
PricewaterhouseCoopers	London, United Kingdom	364,232	June 2023
Sopra Steria	Paris, France	53,724	March 2023
TietoEVRY	Espoo, Finland	24,071	March 2023
T-Systems	Frankfurt, Germany	28,000	December 2022

=== North America ===
Name	Headquarters	Total employees	As of
Avanade	Seattle, Washington, United States	50,000	December 2021
Booz Allen Hamilton	McLean, Virginia, United States	25,803	February 2019
CGI Inc.	Montreal, Canada	91,000	March 2023
Cognizant Technology Solutions	Teaneck, New Jersey, United States	351,500	March 2023
Concentrix	Newark, California, United States	440,000	December 2023
Conduent	Florham Park, New Jersey, United States	58,600	March 2023
DXC Technology	Tysons, Virginia, United States	134,035	December 2022
EXL Service	New York City, New York, United States	45,400	December 2022
Genpact	New York City, New York, United States	119,000	March 2023
Hewlett Packard Enterprise	Spring, Texas, United States	60,200	March 2023
IBM Consulting	New York City, United States	160,000	November 2025.
Leidos	San Diego, California, United States	45,000	December 2022
Kyndryl	New York, New York, United States	87,708	January 2023
Softtek	Monterrey, Mexico	12,000	November 2017
Science Applications International Corporation	Reston, Virginia, United States	23,000	February 2019
Telus International	Vancouver, Canada	58,000	December 2020
Unisys	Blue Bell, Pennsylvania, United States	17,200	December 2020
UST	Aliso Viejo, California, United States	30,000	October 2023
Virtusa	Southborough, Massachusetts, United States	30,000	October 2020
Gartner	Stamford, Connecticut, United States	19,830	March 2023
Slalom Consulting	Seattle, Washington, United States	13,000	April 2023

=== South America ===
Name	Headquarters	Total company employees	As of
Algar Tech	Uberlândia, Brazil	21,000	November 2022
Totvs	São Paulo, Brazil	12,000	November 2022
Stefanini IT Solutions	Jaguariúna, Brazil	30,000	April 2022
