= ErgoGroup =

Nordic tech company

ErgoGroup AS
- Company type: Subsidiary
- Industry: Information technology
- Founded: Oslo, Norway (1972)
- Founder: Norwegian Ministry of Government Administration
- Defunct: 2010
- Fate: Merged with EDB Business Partner ASA
- Successor: EDB ErgoGroup ASA
- Headquarters: Oslo, Norway
- Area served: Nordic Region
- Key people: Terje Mjøs (CEO); Dag Mejdell (Chairman)
- Services: IT consulting; Business software; IT operations
- Net income: NOK5,7 billion (2008)
- Number of employees: 3,750 (2009)
- Parent: Posten Norge
- Footnotes / references Merger

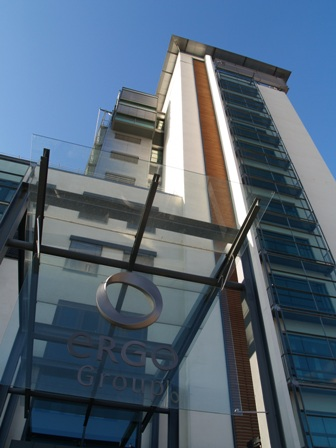
Corporate headquarters in Nydalen in Oslo, Norway

ErgoGroup was a Nordic information technology corporation, systems integrator and consulting company headquartered in Oslo, Norway. The company provided services for IT operations, business solutions, outsourcing, infrastructure and consulting. ErgoGroup had a total of 90 offices and regional branches throughout Norway, Sweden and Finland, and was a subsidiary of Posten Norge, the Norwegian Postal Service. The company also held partial ownership in SYSteam, TransWare, Gecko, Eiendomsverdi, Buypass, Eye-Share and Bekk Consulting. ErgoGroup merged with EDB Business Partner in 2010, creating EVRY.

== Organisation and services ==
ErgoGroup organised its services in Norway into five business areas: IT Operations, Solutions, Regional Services, the Nordic countries|Nordic Region and Bekk Consulting. IT Operations work primarily with outsourcing contracts aimed at the key account market. This business area also had responsibility for ErgoGroup's communications services, and developed basic operating solutions that were used by all of ErgoGroup's business areas. Other areas covered by IT Operations were cloud computing and software as a service (SaaS), network solutions, virtualisation, security and IT surveillance.

The second business area, Solutions, delivered software, services and business sector solutions that streamlined selected work processes within the public and private sectors. Examples of areas of specialisation were: finance and corporate performance management, portal, case and document handling, business consultancy and process optimisation, development, architecture and integration, electronic transactions, and information databases.

Regional Services covered ErgoGroup's smaller businesses and businesses outside the main cities and regional centres. This area covered IT infrastructure, electronic collaboration, unified communications, portals, enterprise content management, enterprise resource planning, customer relationship management, mobile solutions, service-oriented architecture (SOA) and IT infrastructure library.

In 2007, ErgoGroup bought Bekk Consulting, a Norwegian consultancy company in which ErgoGroup then had 75 per cent ownership shares and options to purchase the remaining 25 per cent within three years. Bekk Consulting supplied consultancy, development and management services in the following areas: process and organisational development, modernisation of professional systems, portal and self-service solutions and customised business applications.

== History ==
The company was founded as the government agency Statens Driftssentral for administrativ databehandling in 1972, to perform operational services related to IT operation. In 1985, it was made a limited company and renamed Statens Datasentral AS, owned by the Norwegian Ministry of Government Administration. It bought TF Data in 1989, Oslo Data in 1991 and Statdata in 1993. The postal service bought the company in 1995, changing its name to Posten SDS. It was renamed to Ergogroup in 2001. In 2005, the company bought the outsourcing division of Ementor and in 2006 Nor-Cargo Data, AddIQ, Fujitsu Services Norway, SYSteam (at NOK 1.1 billion) and Allianse (at NOK 900 million). In 2007, it bought 75 per cent of Bekk Consulting.

Due to an increased customer base and enhanced value creation, ErgoGroup has experienced a steady and organic growth in recent years. The ICT industry as a whole is in a process of consolidation, due partly to market demands for increased professionalism on the part of suppliers. ErgoGroup has been an active participant in this development and has consolidated its core activities through strategic acquisitions.

In May 2010, Telenor owned EDB Business Partner, who announced that it was in strategic discussions with ErgoGroup, which later lead to a merger between Norway's two biggest IT companies.

The announcement of merging between EDB Business Partner and ErgoGroup was official by June 7, 2010.

== IT-tinget ==
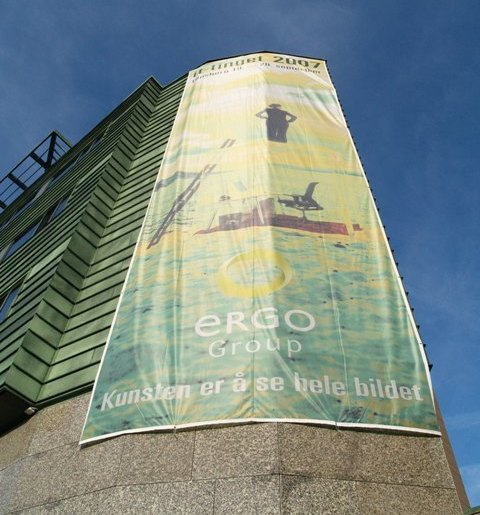
Billboard advertising IT-tinget 2007 in Tønsberg

ErgoGroup organized an annual two-day IT conference called IT-tinget. In 2007, there were almost 600 participants at the event, and some of the speakers were the former Swedish Prime Minister Göran Persson, business guru Jonas Ridderstråle, founder Shahzad Rana and former professional alpinist and Olympic champion Kjetil André Aamodt.
