= Brightgrove =

Global IT services company

- Type: Private
- Industry: Information technology, Software development, IT consulting, Outsourcing
- Number of locations: 8 in 6 countries
- Area served: Worldwide
- Services: Custom software development; Managed IT services; Cloud transformation; Technology consulting; Staff augmentation
- Number of employees: 400+
- Website: www.brightgrove.com

Brightgrove is a multinational information technology and software development company. It provides software engineering and IT consulting services. The company maintains operations in Germany, Ukraine, Romania, Poland, the United States, and Latin America.

== History ==
Brightgrove was founded in 2011 in Kharkiv, Ukraine, by Vsevolod Grebnyev and Andriy Borovitskiy. The company initially provided software engineering services. By 2018, it had opened an office in Kyiv. In 2022, Brightgrove expanded its operations internationally, opening offices in Bucharest, Romania, and Wrocław, Poland, as well as establishing a presence in Latin America.

== Operations ==
Brightgrove provides IT services to companies in sectors such as video streaming, hospitality, real estate, renewable energy, manufacturing, finance, and consumer electronics. The company's clients have included Pluto TV, HRS Group, and Zwilling.

In 2024, Brightgrove became a partner in the Amazon Web Services (AWS) Partner Network, and in 2025, it joined the International Air Transport Association (IATA) Strategic Partnership Program. The company is certified under the ISO/IEC 27001:2022 standard for information security management, and is a member of the IT Ukraine Association.

== Recognition ==
In 2021, the Ukrainian IT portal DOU ranked Brightgrove 49th on its list of the top 50 IT companies in Ukraine based on employee count.

In 2021, Brightgrove received a Red Dot Award in the "Brands & Communication Design".
