= Aspire Foundation =

Aspire Foundation is a non-profit organization that mentors women in the non-profit sector.

== Organizational goals ==
The organization has a goal of empowering one billion women by 2020 to be leaders in their communities.

== Founding ==
The Aspire Foundation was founded by Dr. Sam Collins in the United Kingdom. The first group of leaders to participate were from Women for Women International.

== Current initiatives ==
The Aspire Foundation has partnered with Avanade to encourage women to be leaders in the technology sector.
