= Skrypnyk =

Skrypnyk (Ukrainian: Скрипник) is a Ukrainian surname. Notable people with the surname include:

- Mstyslav Skrypnyk (1898–1993), Ukrainian Orthodox Church Patriarch
- Mykola Skrypnyk (1872–1933), Soviet Bolshevik politician and statesman
- Oleksiy Skrypnyk (1964–2022), a Ukrainian politician.
- Viktor Skrypnyk (born 1969), Ukrainian footballer

== See also ==
- Skripnik
- Skrypnik
