= Minecode =

Former privately held IT consulting company

Minecode, LLC
- Company type: Privately held company
- Industry: Global information services
- Genre: Information and technology services
- Founded: August 2001
- Founder: PK Samal, Anthony Springer, Sambit Behera
- Defunct: February 15, 2010
- Fate: Bankruptcy
- Headquarters: Bellevue, Washington, United States
- Area served: Pacific Northwest
- Key people: PK Samal, CEO; Jon Day, Senior Vice President, Sales and Marketing
- Products: Marketing Media Platform
- Services: Technology consulting, application development, testing, enterprise application integration, business intelligence, Web 2.0 and Enterprise 2.0
- Number of employees: 150
- Website: www.minecode.com

Minecode, LLC was a privately held IT consulting company based in Bellevue, Washington, United States. It had development centers both in India and the U.S with focus on Microsoft, Java, and Web 2.0 technologies.

== History ==
Minecode was established in 2001 as Syntegral, LLC. In 2003, Syntegral, LLC changed its name to Minecode. In 2005, Minecode established an offshore subsidiary in Gurgaon, India. Minecode currently is DBA Minebrain, headquartered in India. Samal moved remaining assets offshore to avoid attachment in bankruptcy and legal proceedings.

In 2007, Minecode purchased Seattle-based X6 Technologies, a company specializing in customized marketing and VDP technology solutions and shortly thereafter, in early 2008, purchased Saltmine, an interactive design firm with offices in Seattle, Washington and Portland, Oregon.

In February 2010, Minecode and Saltmine filed for bankruptcy leaving multiple employees with unpaid salaries and expenses. The employees have filed suit following the bankruptcy filing.

== Scandals ==
Minecode employees, CEO Pradyumna Samal (PK Samal) and project manager Sandeep Verma, pleaded guilty to several counts of computer intrusion in 2009. The charges arose after the employees at the Bellevue Web development shop intentionally disabled the Web site of Vinado, an online wine shop that had allegedly failed to pay its bills.

Verma was ordered to pay a $2,500 fine and sentenced to 1 year of probation. Minecode itself was also sentenced to 3 years' probation, a fine of $144,000 and a restitution of $120,000.

Samal was sentenced to 90 days of home confinement with electronic monitoring and 3 years' probation. He was also instructed to complete 288 hours of community service and undergo moral reconation therapy.
