= ISoftStone =

Chinese IT Company

iSoftStone Information Technology (Group) Co., Ltd.

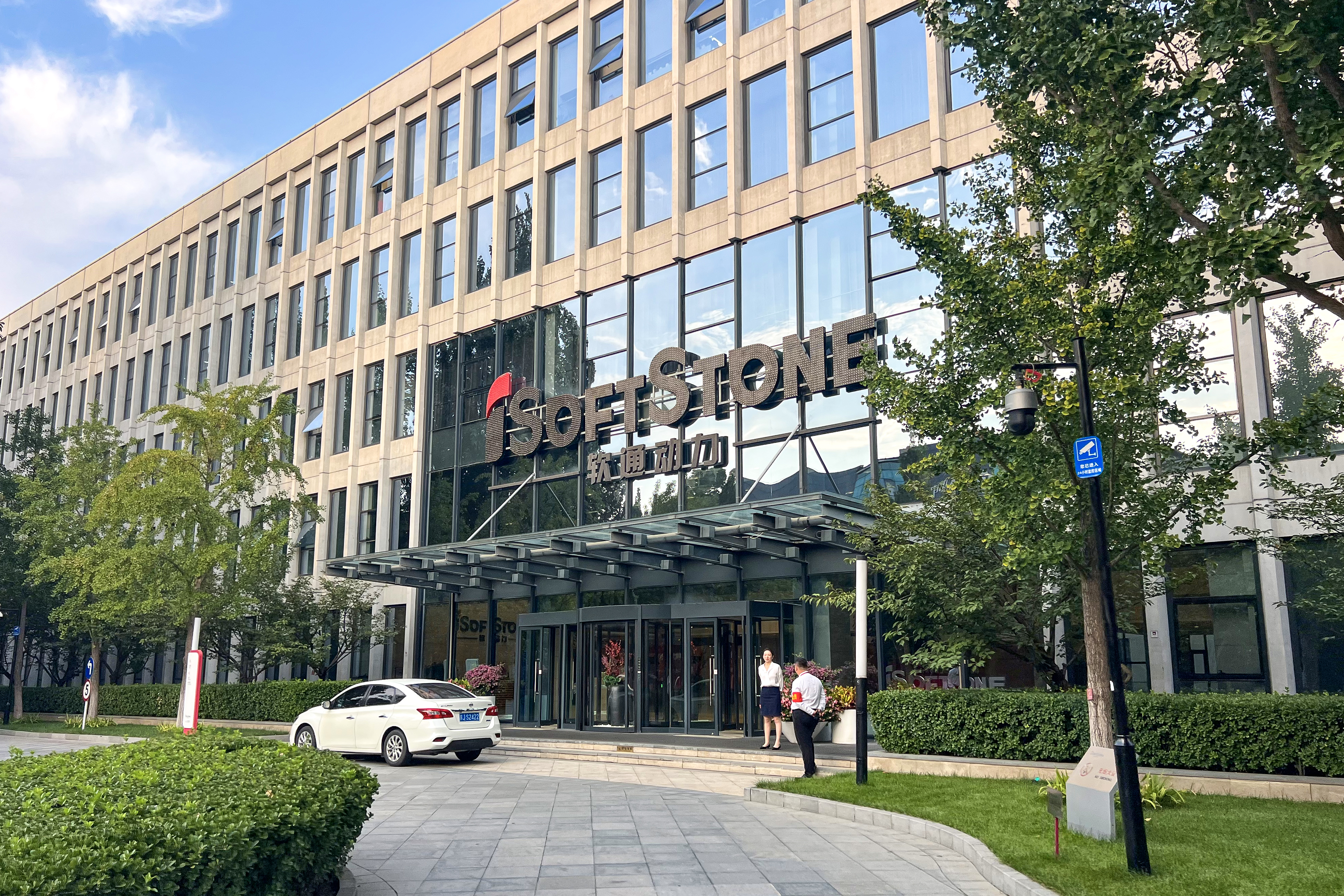
- Headquarters
- Native name: 软通动力信息技术 (集团) 股份有限公司
- Company type: Public
- Traded as: SZSE: 301236
- Industry: Information technology
- Founded: October 2001; 24 years ago
- Founder: Liu Tianwen
- Headquarters: Beijing, China
- Key people: Liu Tianwen (Chairman & CEO)
- Revenue: ▼CN¥17.58 billion (2023)
- Net income: ▼CN¥486.71 million (2023)
- Total assets: ▲CN¥15.62 billion (2023)
- Total equity: ▲CN¥10.60 billion (2023)
- Number of employees: 85,470 (2023)
- Website: www.isoftstone.com

iSoftStone Information Technology (Group) Co., Ltd. (iSoftStone; Chinese: 软通动力; pinyin: Ruǎntōng Dònglì) is a publicly listed Chinese information technology company headquartered in Beijing.

== Background ==
In 2001, iSoftStone was founded by MIT Sloan School of Management MBA graduate Liu Tianwen.

iSoftStone initially focused on providing information technology consulting and outsourcing services where it served clients such as IBM, AT&T and Microsoft. However it didn't compete with firms that focused on much large global projects such as Accenture, IBM or Hewlett-Packard. Instead its competitions were mainly other Chinese firms as well as firms based in countries that had low wage costs.

iSoftStone made several acquisitions in the US. In February 2008 it acquired Akona Consulting, a Seattle-based business and technology consulting firm. In October 2010, it acquired Boston-based Ascend Technologies and in August 2011, acquired Adventier Consulting Group.

In December 2010, iSoftStone held its initial public offering to become a listed company on the New York Stock Exchange (NYSE) where it raised $141 million.

Due to declining performance and stock prices iSoftStone made the decision to go private. In April 2014, it accepted an offer from China Everbright Investment Management to take it private in a $332 million deal and was eventually delisted from the NYSE.

iSoftStone attempted to go public in China and made three backdoor listing attempts but they all failed. In early 2022, iSoftStone regained its status as a listed company by listing on the ChiNext section of the Shenzhen Stock Exchange. At this point, the majority of iSoftStone's revenue came from Chinese companies with almost 50% of it coming from Huawei.

According to a report in December 2024 by Canalys, iSoftStone secured second place in the desktop and notebook shipment rankings in Q3 2024.

== See also ==
- List of IT consulting firms
