= Skripnik =

Skripnik is a surname. Notable people with the surname include:

- Gennadi Skripnik (born 1962), Uzbekistani footballer
- Irina Skripnik (born 1970), Belarusian cross-country skier
- Julia Skripnik (born 1985), Estonian tennis player

== See also ==
- Skrypnyk
- Skrypnik
