= EDB Business Partner =

Norwegian information technology company

EDB Business Partner ASA
- Trade name: EDB
- Company type: Public
- Traded as: (OSE: EDBASA)
- Industry: Information technology
- Defunct: October 2010
- Fate: Merged with ErgoGroup AS
- Successor: EDB ErgoGroup ASA
- Headquarters: Oslo, Norway
- Area served: Nordic countries
- Key people: as at 2010: John-Arne Haugerud (Acting CEO); Arve Johansen (Chairman)
- Website: edb.com

EDB Business Partner ASA, trading as EDB (Norwegian: Elektronisk Databehandling) was a Norwegian information technology company that supplied many services relating to computing, including operation, outsourcing and online banking. The company was headquartered in Oslo and listed on the Oslo Stock Exchange. Telenor owned 51.3% of EDB. EDB BP has wholly owned subsidiaries in Sweden and Denmark, and more recently acquired the majority of Miratech and Infopulse, which are Ukrainian IT companies.

EDB Business Partner was a full owner in the companies Fellesdata AS (acquired 2001), Avenir AS, EDB Telecom AS, Spring Consulting AS, PDS AS and TAG Systems AS. On 8 January 2008, an agreement was entered into with StatoilHydro that the company would purchase IS Partner, which was previously under Hydro under the name Hydro IS Partner.

In June 2010, EDB announced a merger with ErgoGroup, another big IT company in Norway. As of October 2010, the newly merged company was called EDB ErgoGroup, which in March 2012, took the name Evry.

The company made headlines in several major newspapers in Sweden in March 2009, when a consultant hired through a recruitment company was fired because he, outside work, had expressed political views belonging to the Pirate Party in a public chat interview organized by the newspaper Nerikes Allehanda.
