= Infopulse =

IT company in Poland

Coordinates: 51.7604°N 19.466°E

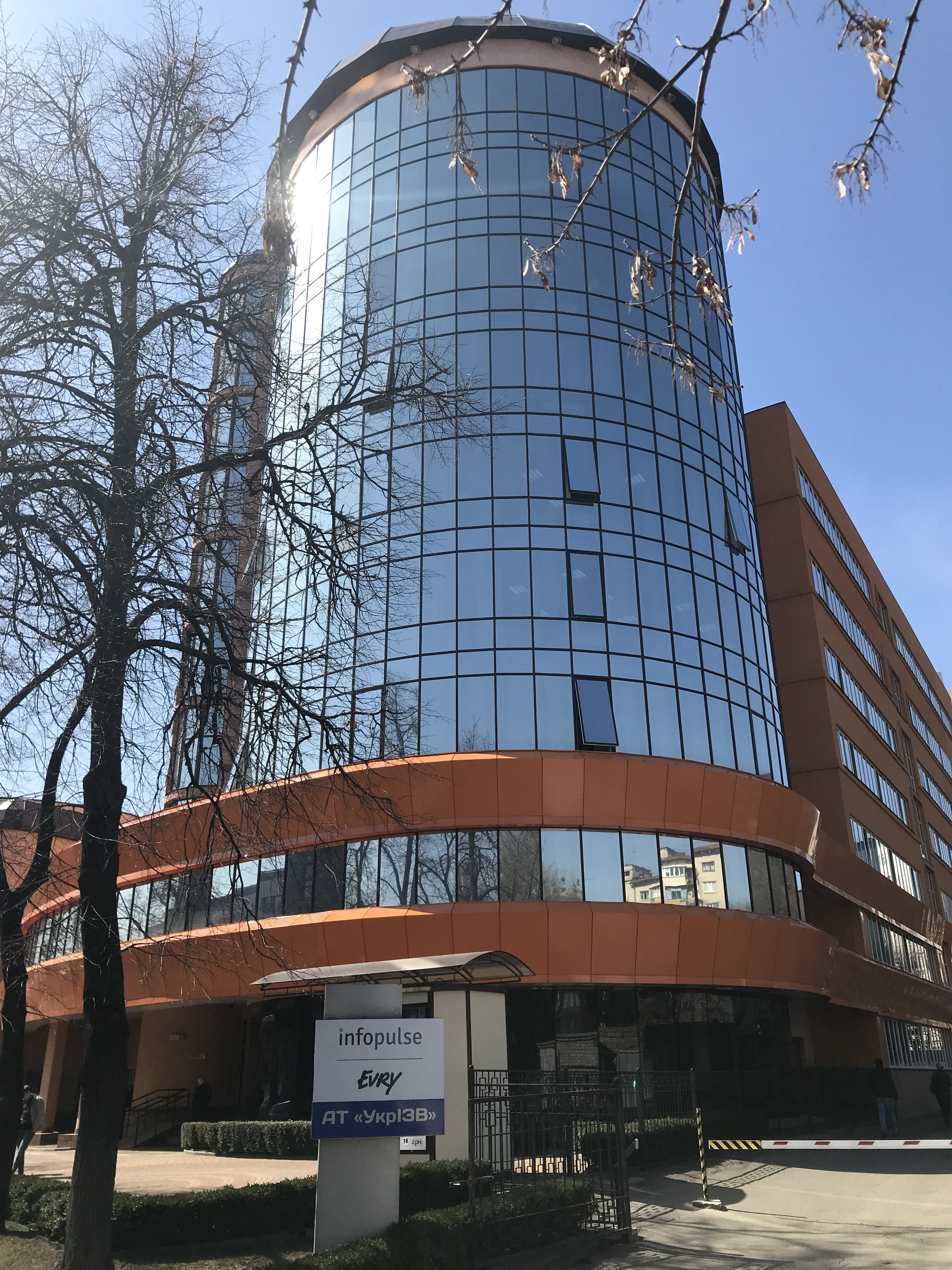
- Company Office in Kyiv, Ukraine
- Type: Subsidiary
- Industry: Information technologies; Software engineering
- Founded: February 1991; 35 years ago in Kyiv, Ukraine
- Founders: Olexiy Sihov, Andriy Anisimov
- Headquarters: Łódź, Poland
- Area served: Europe, North America
- Key people: Olexiy Sihov (president); Andriy Anisimov (CEO)
- Services: R&D, software development, cloud, big data, IT infrastructure management, mobile application development, IT consulting, cybersecurity, BPO
- Parent: Tietoevry
- Website: Infopulse.com

Infopulse (also known as Infopulse Group) is a software development and information technology (IT) outsourcing company headquartered in Łódź, Poland. The company operates as a subsidiary of Tietoevry, a Nordic IT services provider.

The company was founded in 1991 in Kyiv, Ukraine by Oleksiy Sihov and Andriy Anisimov.

In 2007, Infopulse became a part of the Norwegian information technology company EDB Business Partner ASA. Following subsequent mergers, the company became a subsidiary of Evry and later Tietoevry after the Evry–Tieto merger in 2019.

Infopulse provide software research and development, development of mobile applications and software, and IT consulting services.

Infopulse is a member of several industry and business associations in Europe and Ukraine.

== History ==
Infopulse was founded in 1991 in Kyiv, Ukraine. In the 1990s, the company focused on software development and IT services for public and private sector clients in Eastern Europe. By the early 2000s, Infopulse expanded its operations through partnerships with international companies.

In 2007, a majority stake in Infopulse was acquired by EDB. Following mergers in the Nordic IT sector, the company became part of Evry. and later Tietoevry.

March 2013 – company opens subsidiary in Germany.

August 2015 – company acquires delivery company in Varna, Bulgaria.

January 2016 – company opens a regional branch in France.

2017 – company opens three local Ukrainian delivery centers in Lviv, Kharkiv, and Odesa.

2018 – company expands EU presence by opening a delivery center in Warsaw, Poland.

== Services ==
Infopulse provides services in high tech area. Its main activities are:

- Software R&D and quality assurance
- Enterprise mobile applications development
- IT infrastructure management and cloud services
- SAP-, Microsoft-, AWS- and Oracle-based systems implementation, integration and support
- Application packaging and virtualization
- Security consulting
- Telecom operations and customer service
- Business process putsourcing

== Clients ==
Infopulse provides IT services to clients in various industries, primarily in Europe and North America.

== Public and IT Education Initiatives ==
Infopulse takes a part in various education projects aiming to improve public and IT education in Ukraine.

In 2011, Infopulse partnered together with other companies to create BIONIC Hill Innovation Park - a Ukrainian innovation park constructed similarly to the Silicon Valley.

In 2012, Infopulse along with other Ukrainian and international IT companies and institutions co-launched BIONIC University - the first inter-corporate IT university in Ukraine (Kyiv) working on the premises of National University of Kyiv-Mohyla Academy. The University prepared IT specialists for a new formation, who are globally competitive yet aiming at professional fulfillment in Ukraine.

In 2014, Infopulse became a partner of the International Championship of Computer Talents "Golden Byte".

In October 2014, Infopulse supported "АСМ-ІСРС" (World Programming Contest) semi-finals

In 2014, Infopulse together with parent company Evry supported the National University "The Kyiv-Mohyla Academy" program to open larger educational opportunities in IT industry in Ukraine, including second higher education for people who have suffered due to various life circumstances.

In 2016–2017, Infopulse and Ukrainian Center for Educational Quality Assessment (UCEQA) in cooperation with United States Agency for International Development (USAID) restored and improved the External independent testing software system, which provides Ukrainian public education with a transparent school graduation and university admission process.

== Charity causes ==
Infopulse takes part in charity projects by helping orphans, disabled military veterans, older people, and people with Down syndrome, and supporting local charity organizations.

The "Down Syndrome" project. Infopulse together with the Ukrainian Down Syndrome Organization (UDSO) and Down Syndrome Education International (DSEI) launched a long-term charity project in 2010 to help children and people with Down syndrome in Ukraine. This project raises funds for early development programs and other charity causes through a series of charity events, and aims to spread information and improve public awareness about Down syndrome, by organizing Down syndrome conferences and other related events.

Psychosocial Rehabilitation Centre for military. In December 2015, Infopulse with other international and Ukrainian institutions opened the Psychosocial Rehabilitation Centre which helps war heroes, relocated families, their children, and all people, affected by the Russo-Ukrainian War. Center's premises were renovated, refurnished and equipped under modern WHO and UNICEF standards.
