= Dag Mejdell =

Norwegian businessman

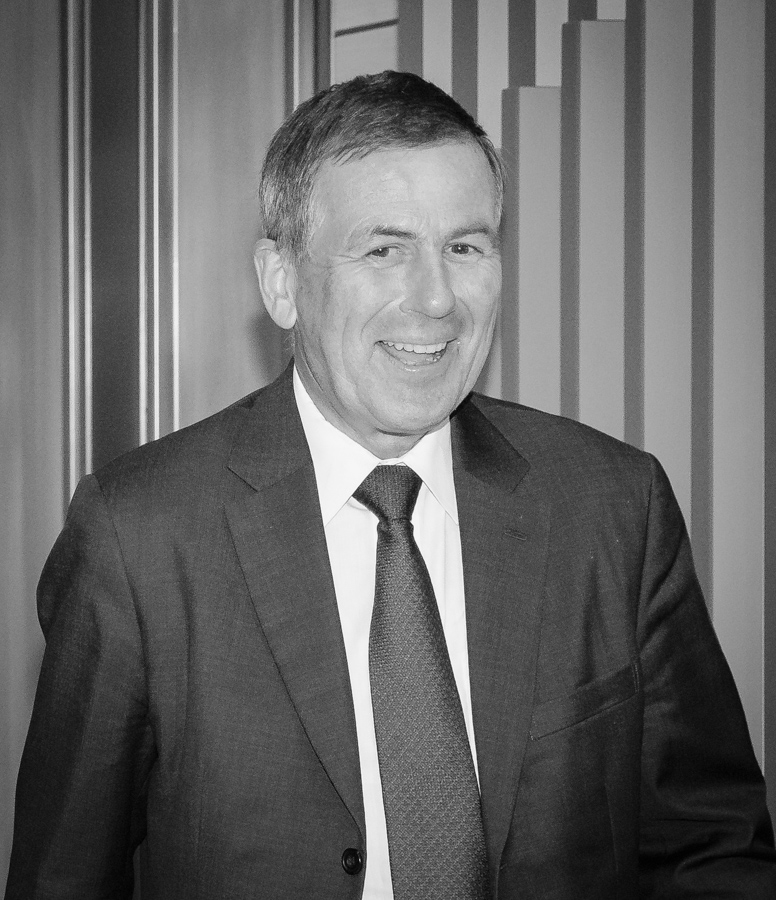
Dag Mejdell

Dag Mejdell (born 28 June 1957) is a Norwegian businessperson and current chief executive officer of Posten Norge, the Norwegian Postal Service as well as chairman of the board of ErgoGroup.

He is educated with a siviløkonom degree from the Norwegian School of Economics and Business Administration and started working for Dyno Industrier in 1981 with various executive positions and finally CEO until 1997. He was CEO in the successor Dyno Nobel between 2000 and 2005 when he was hired by Posten as CEO.
