= Avanade =

Global professional services company

- Type: Subsidiary
- Industry: Professional services Technology services
- Founded: April 4, 2000; 26 years ago
- Founder: Accenture and Microsoft
- Headquarters: Seattle, Washington, U.S.
- Area served: Worldwide
- Key people: Chris Howarth (CEO); Danielle Brady (COO); Katie O'Conor (CFO); Gord Mawhinney (Americas President)
- Services: Digital marketing, IT services, IT consulting
- Revenue: ▲US$ 4.0 billion (2025)
- Number of employees: 80,000 (2025)
- Parent: Accenture
- Website: www.avanade.com/en

Avanade (/ˈævənɑːd/) is a global professional services company providing IT consulting and services focused on the Microsoft platform with artificial intelligence, business analytics, cloud, application services, digital transformation, modern workplace, security services, technology and managed services offerings. Headquartered in Seattle, the company has 50,000 employees in 26 countries.

== History ==
Avanade was formed in April 2000, as a joint venture between Andersen Consulting (later Accenture) and Microsoft, and today is majority-owned by Accenture. The company maintains the Accenture-Microsoft alliance to combine Accenture's consulting with Microsoft's scalable cloud and mobile technologies. The name Avanade is a portmanteau between avenue and promenade.

Pamela Maynard took over from Adam Warby as CEO beginning on September 1, 2019.

In July 2020, Avanade joined the Microsoft Intelligent Security Association (MISA), an alliance of autonomous tech suppliers and defense service providers who have partnered with Microsoft Defense to help protect themselves against an environment of increasing cybersecurity threats.

In April 2022, Avanade announced the building of its first US-based engineering center in Tampa, Florida, adding around 500 new entry- and senior-level engineering, data and software development jobs over the next three years.

In September 2024, Rodrigo Caserta has stepped into the role as CEO of Avanade as Pamela Maynard has accepted a new role as Chief AI Transformation Officer for Microsoft Customer and Partner Solutions (MCAPS). Pamela Maynard had been with Avanade for 16 years.

In February 2026, Chris Howarth has been appointed as Chief Executive Officer of Avanade. Rodrigo Caserta, who will step down as CEO after more than 11 years with Avanade to join Microsoft as Corporate Vice President, Small, Medium Enterprises & Channel (SME&C), Americas. Caserta served as Avanade’s CEO since 2024.

=== Acquisitions ===
Overview of business acquisitions by Avanade
Number	Date	Company	Business	Country	References
1	March 3, 2003	DCG	Online business consulting and integration	Australia	
2	May 27, 2003	G.A. Sullivan	Information technology	United States	
3	May 2, 2005	en’tegrat	Microsoft Dynamics specialists	United States	
4	November 2, 2007	HOB	Consulting firm, specializing in Microsoft Dynamics AX solutions	Denmark	
5	June 4, 2008	Quadreon	Microsoft Dynamics specialists	Belgium	
6	May 18, 2010	Ascentium Corporation	Microsoft Dynamics specialists, Avanade acquired the US portion of the CRM practice	United States	
7	October 5, 2011	ECONNEX AG	Microsoft Dynamics specialists	Germany	
8	December 18, 2012	Azaleos	Managed messaging, collaboration & unified communications services	United States	
9	April 28, 2015	KCS.net	Information technology	Switzerland	
10	August 3, 2015	CloudTalent	Strategic cloud advisory	United Kingdom	
11	February 28, 2017	Infusion Development	Digital transformation, application modernization, and cloud-scale solutions	United States	
12	August 14, 2018	Loud&Clear	Technology and experience design	Australia	
13	September 24, 2019	Alnamic AG	Microsoft Dynamics 365 and AX specialists	Germany	
14	March 9, 2020	Altius	Data and artificial intelligence specialists	United Kingdom	
15	May 5, 2020	Concert	ERP solutions	Italy	
16	September 20, 2020	AZEO	Data and AI, cloud and IoT	France	
17	November 22, 2021	QUANTIQ	Microsoft Business Applications	United Kingdom	
18	May 27, 2022	Kabel	Data, AI and cloud	Spain	
19	June 20, 2022	Asysco	Legacy application migration	Netherlands	
20	September 28, 2022	eLogic	Technology consulting firm	United States	
21	September 30, 2025	Total eBiz Solutions	Digital transformation, automation, AI solutions	Singapore	

== Corporate affairs ==
=== Structure and operations ===
Avanade operates its business in more than 80 locations across more than 26 countries North America, Europe, Asia, South America, the Middle East and the Pacific.

India (IDC), China (CDC) and the Philippines (PDC) supply Avanade with offshore consultants housed in parent company Accenture's delivery centers. Overall, these offshore workers constitute over 40% of Avanade's total workforce. Avanade relies heavily on offshore workers in India, China and other developing countries.

=== Leadership ===
Former Avanade logo.

Avanade is managed by a leadership team of 17 members (2022). Pamela Maynard served as CEO from September 2019 to October 2024. Mitch Hill, a former senior partner at Andersen Consulting, was the founding CEO until August 31, 2008. Adam Warby held the position from September 1, 2008, to August 31, 2019.

Avanade's board of directors has five members (2022). The chairman of the board is Emma McGuigan.

=== Finances ===
Avanade began filing financial reports with the Securities and Exchange Commission in 2006, a requirement for publicly traded companies. Alternatively, filings must be made when the number of security holders exceeded 500, which at the time, Avanade had over 1,100. As of July 1, 2008, Avanade is no longer required to file financial reports with the Securities and Exchange Commission as it has unregistered all securities.

== See also ==
- List of IT consulting firms
