= Skrypnik =

Skrypnik (Belarusian: Скрыпнік) is a Belarusan-language surname. Russian variant: Skripnik, Ukrainian: Skrypnyk. Noitable people with the surname include:

- Daria Skrypnik, Russian artistic gymnast
- Darya Skrypnik, Belarusian judoka
- Sergey Skrypnik, Kazakhstani sprint canoer
