= Evry =

Norwegian information technology firm

EVRY A/S
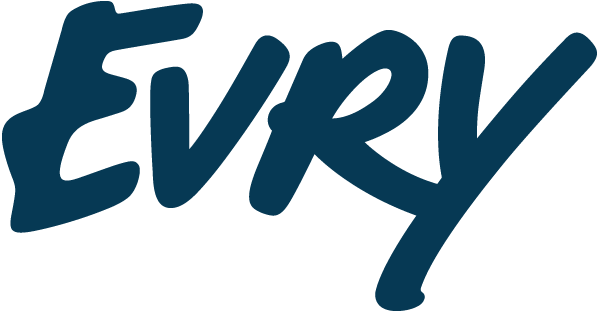
- Type: Limited company
- Industry: Information technology
- Predecessor: EDB Business Partner; ErgoGroup
- Founded: Oslo, Norway (October 2010)
- Defunct: 5 December 2019
- Headquarters: Oslo, Norway
- Number of locations: 50 offices
- Area served: Worldwide
- Key people: Per Hove (CEO); Salim Nathoo (Chairman)
- Services: IT consulting; Business solutions; IT infrastructure
- Revenue: ▲NOK 12.9 billion (2015)
- Operating income: ▲NOK 811 million (2015)
- Net income: 300,000,000 Norwegian krone (2016)
- Number of employees: 10,000 (2014)
- Website: www.evry.com
- Footnotes; Financials Key people Services

EVRY A/S was a Norwegian information technology company that supplied services related to computing, including operation, outsourcing and online banking. The company was headquartered in Oslo. It was established through a merger between EDB Business Partner and ErgoGroup in 2010 and had 10,000 employees at 135 offices in 16 countries.

In June 2019, Tieto paid EUR 1.2 billion for the acquisition of EVRY. The new company was named TietoEVRY and had over 24,000 employees.

== History ==
EDB ErgoGroup ASA was formed in 2010 with the merger of EDB Business Partner and ErgoGroup. Telenor owned most of the shares of ErgoGroup. The company subsequently changed its name to EVRY ASA in April 2012.

In August 2014, EVRY announced it was initiating a process to investigate strategic opportunities after its assessment of the IT sector in the Nordic countries. In March 2015, Apax Partners became the majority owner of the company, a new board was appointed, and it decided to apply for a delisting from the stock exchange. On 29 October 2015, the company was delisted from the Oslo Stock Exchange.

In August 2015, following the loss of a contract with the Norwegian bank DNB, EVRY announced it would lay off 500–550 workers in Norway and Sweden to increase profits, saving NOK 400–500 million (about US$50–60 million). In October 2015, it announced the transfer of 600 employees to IBM in an outsourcing deal worth US$1 billion.

On 13 December 2018, Handelsbanken and EVRY agreed to deliver next-generation core banking and payment services in Finland. The agreement represents a total contract value of approximately NOK 650 million and runs for eight years.

In 2019, it was announced that EVRY would merge with Tieto. The merged company, TietoEVRY, began operations on 2 January 2020.

== EVRY India ==
EVRY India Pvt. Ltd.
- Type: Subsidiary
- Industry: Computer applications and IT services
- Predecessor: Span Infotech
- Founded: Bangalore, India 1993
- Defunct: 5 December 2019
- Headquarters: Bangalore, India
- Area served: Worldwide
- Key people: Rajnish Mohan (CEO and Managing Director)
- Products: IT products and services
- Revenue: 12,200,000,000 Norwegian krone (2016)
- Net income: 300,000,000 Norwegian krone (2016)
- Number of employees: 8,500 (2016)
- Parent: EVRY A/S
- Website: www.evry.in

EVRY acquired Span Infotech, an Indian IT company, which was renamed EVRY India to be coherent with its parent company. EVRY India is a software services company headquartered in Bangalore and Chandigarh and a provider of IT and software product development services to customers based in North America and Europe, operating in banking and financial services, insurance, healthcare, retail and logistics industries.

In 2016, EVRY announced it would double the manpower at its Indian subsidiary, then 600 in Mohali and 1,500 in Bangalore, over three years, investing INR 1–1.25 billion.

In December 2017, the company opened a new branch in Bangalore at Global Village Tech Park.
