= QArea Company =

IT outsourcing company

- Company type: Private
- Industry: Information Technology
- Founded: 2001
- Number of employees: 350+
- Website: qarea.com

QArea Company is an IT outsourcing company operating in the markets of the US and Europe. The company is mainly specialized in custom software development, software testing, web applications development and mobile software development. QArea has its headquarters in Beverly Hills, California and its offshore development center in Lviv, Ukraine. The number of employees is about 350+ software engineers, managers and testers.

== History ==
QArea Company was founded in 2001 by Max Garkavtsev, who is currently a CEO of the company. At that period the company was mainly operating in the fast-growing IT market – Mobile&Wireless. During the period of 2001–2005 QArea had met a rapid business growth, and by the end of 2006 it was already operated with several business units. In 2008 QArea became a Microsoft Certified Partner and in 2011 – Microsoft Gold Certified Partner. QArea is also working with Microsoft as an outsourcing provider.

== Industry practices ==
- Projects in scalable internet services area (e-Commerce, e-Community, Web 2.0, WAP);
- Business process automation (CRM, Billing, Logistics)
- Mobile and Wireless technologies (VoIP, GPRS, GPS, Wi-Fi, WAP, Bluetooth);
- GIS and navigation systems;
- Search systems with mobile access;
- IT security
- QA and software testing;

== Partnership ==
- Microsoft
- Drupal.org
- American Chamber of Commerce in Ukraine
- Mobile Monday
- The Global Outsourcing 100® and The World's Best Outsourcing Advisors
- Community Sponsor of Joomla
- Ukrainian Hi-Tech Initiative
- CEEOA
- IAOP
- Acquia

== See also ==
- Offshore software development
- Outsourcing
- Information technology consulting
