= BIONIC Hill Innovation Park =

First Ukrainian innovation park being constructed similarly to the Silicon Valley

BIONIC Hill
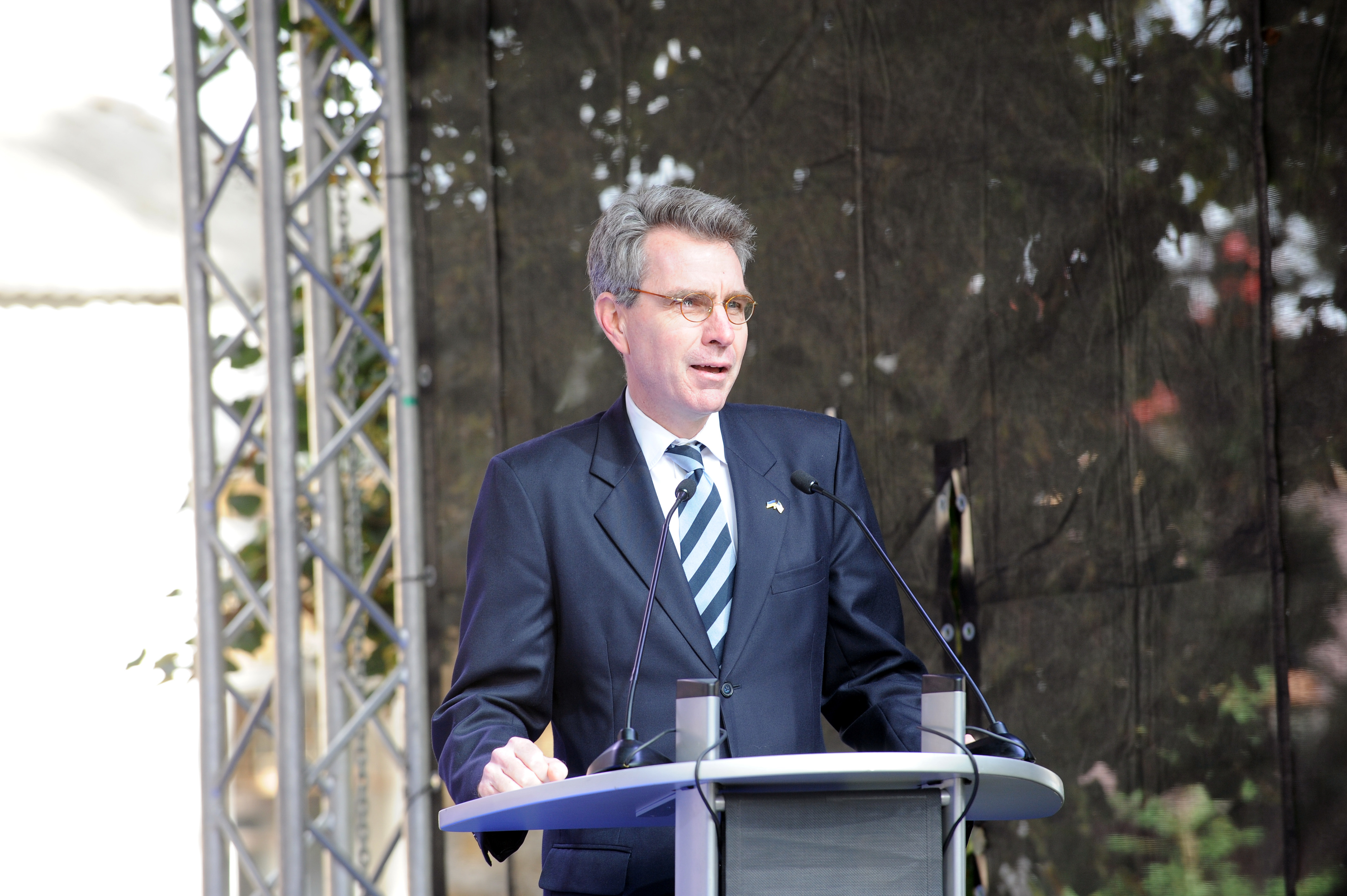
- Opening ceremony of BIONIC University. US Ambassador to Ukraine Jeffrey R. Payette, 27 September 2013
- Founded: 2011
- Headquarters: Kyiv, Ukraine
- Website: www.bionic-hill.com

BIONIC Hill is the first Ukrainian innovation park being constructed similarly to the Silicon Valley. Estimated project investment is to reach 1 billion US dollars.

== Location ==
BIONIC Hill Innovation Park will be located on 147 hectares in the Sviatoshynsky city district of Kyiv, on the territory of the former military townlet No. 136. Approximate distance to the BIONIC Hill site is 2.5 km from Kyiv ring road, 7.5 km from the nearest metro station Akademmistechko, 17 km from Kyiv downtown, and 20 km from Kyiv (Zhulyany) International Airport. The Park founder is businessman Vasyl Khmelnytsky.

== Concept ==
BIONIC Hill is meant to create an innovative ecosystem based on the concept "Live, work, learn and play." It sets the goal of creating a unique platform for business growth and providing comfortable living and a business environment for hi-tech specialists. BIONIC Hill focuses on promotion and development of information and communication technologies, biotech and pharmaceutical, energy saving, and clean energy solutions.

The project stipulates accommodation of local and international companies, project teams, showrooms, R&D centers, demo laboratories, and clean hi-tech production. Apart from that, the project will provide optimum conditions for startup development.

Among BIONIC Hill partners are the technology companies Robert BOSCH Ukraine, Cisco Systems Inc., and Infopulse Ukraine.

One of the key components of BIONIC Hill is open intercorporate IT university BIONIC University. The institution was officially opened on December 27, 2013. Prior to its official opening, BIONIC University worked in test mode for a year. Currently, the institution works at the premises of the National University of Kyiv-Mohyla Academy; as soon as the first stage of BIONIC Hill construction is finished, BIONIC University will move into its own building there. The university trains IT-specialists in three majors: tech skills (programming), soft skills (social interaction), and entrepreneurship (starting and operating a business).

== Infrastructure ==
BIONIC Hill will combine business, education, research, production, social and recreation infrastructure for 35,000 employees and 12,000 residents of the innovation town.

Business infrastructure will include business centers (330,000 sqm), a training and research center, which will house BIONIC University, hi-tech production facilities, a hotel, and conference hall. Plans also include a datacenter, venture funds, banks, law and accounting firms, and patent offices. The project will have a full-fledged social infrastructure (120,000 sqm in total), with a kindergarten, school, hospital, restaurants, shops, a fitness center, and a dormitory. Housing for the employees of tenant companies and their families (450,000 sqm) is also planned. The park stipulates creation of a large recreational area planted with valuable tree species and landscaping of an artificial lake. BIONIC Hill will be the first facility in Ukraine to apply the LEED green building certification system.

== Project development ==
BIONIC Hill project was initiated in 2011 by UDP, the Ukrainian leading real estate developer and investor, with the support of the Kyiv City State Administration. The project is a 100% private business initiative.

- March 29, 2012 saw the first public presentation of BIONIC Hill innovation park at First Kyiv Investment Forum.
- June 7, 2012 UDP signed a bi-lateral MoU with the State Agency for Science, Innovation and Informatization of Ukraine to unite efforts for execution of BIONIC Hill project.
- July 30, 2012 UDP and the Kyiv City State Administration signed a LOI to implement BIONIC Hill Innovation Park project.
- August 3, 2012 BIONIC Hill is included in Technopolis National Project: Innovation and Hi-Tech Infrastructure Development.
- October 31, 2012 the Cabinet of Ministers of Ukraine approves a preliminary feasibility study of Technopolis National Project.
- November 24 – December 2, 2012 BIONIC Hill was presented at Stanford University (California), Washington, Chicago and Toronto during the road-show organized by the State Agency for Investment and National Projects and the Kyiv City State Administration.
- April 16, 2013 saw the establishment of the Global Technology Foundation (GTF), the first Ukrainian IT grant foundation. Founders of GTF are venture funds Runa Capital, TA Venture, Almaz Capital and BIONIC Hill Innovation Park.
- September 27, 2013 saw the official opening of the first open intercorporate IT university BIONIC University, educational initiative of BIONIC Hill.
- February 24, 2016 Bionic Hill won a case in Ukraine's higher administrative court that confirmed the legality of land allocation. The judicial issue was the subject of political manipulation and pressure.

The founder of the Innovation Park, Vasyl Khmelnytsky, said its design prime cost amounted to $800 per square meter, so to ensure profit, the rent of premises should be at least $15 per square meter. According to Khmelnytsky, BIONIC Hill will start working at full capacity as soon as the economic situation in Ukraine improves.

== Expected results ==
Project development stipulates considerable benefits for the country. One of the leading international companies Ernst & Young carried out the project's preliminary feasibility study. The document was approved by the Cabinet of Ministers of Ukraine. According to Ernst & Young's evaluation, as soon as the BIONIC Hill project is up and running at full design capacity, annual revenue of resident companies will exceed ₴7.2 billion, hi-tech export; ₴4.8 billion per annum, and tax revenues to budgets of all levels; and ₴1.3 billion annually

BIONIC Hill is expected to attract foreign investments to Ukraine as well as technologies to ensure a new level of international scientific and technical cooperation, and aims to stimulate creation of innovative clusters in information, biotech, energy efficiency and other hi-tech branches, as well as provide a permanent source of revenues to State Budget of Ukraine and to local budgets.

== Construction ==
Pre-construction activities started in late 2013. The first construction stage is to be commissioned in 2015 and will include a business center, housing, and other social infrastructure. Construction is to be fully completed by 2020. The park will include 900,000 m2 of objects of various uses.

BIONIC Hill contracted American AECOM, which ranks among the five best architectural companies of the world, as a LEED consultant. Leading global and Ukrainian architects, engineers, and designers have been developing the project of the first Ukrainian innovation park (Hornberger+Worstell, ARUP, SWA Group, A. Pashenko architectural studio).
