= Hytracc Consulting =

Norwegian IT solutions company in the oil & gas industry

Hytracc Consulting AS
- Company type: Private
- Industry: Oil and gas
- Founded: 25 January 2010
- Headquarters: Norway
- Number of locations: 7 country subsidiaries (2013)
- Area served: Worldwide
- Key people: Henning Stokke (Chairman and owner); Trond Arve Pettersen (CEO & President)
- Services: Design and implement IT solutions for the hydrocarbon supply chain
- Revenue: ▲NOK 118,7 million (2011)
- Operating income: ▲NOK 19,7 million (2011)
- Net income: ▲NOK 48,4 million (2011)
- Number of employees: 50+ (2011)

Hytracc Consulting AS is a design and implementation service provider for IT solutions assisting oil and gas companies in managing their hydrocarbon exploration supply chain. The company is headquartered in Stavanger, Norway, and also has offices in Aberdeen, Calgary, Groningen, Houston, Trondheim, and Kuala Lumpur.

The company claims to be a leading provider of skills for implementing the Energy Components solution of the vendor Tieto Norway. Hytracc Consulting was founded in 2010 and has recorded a revenue in excess of NOK 118 million in its second fiscal year 2011. The Owners Dividend was NOK 43 million that year. As of 2013, Hytracc Consulting has more than 50 employees worldwide.

On 5 August 2014, Accenture declared in a joint release that it has entered into an agreement to acquire Hytracc Consulting, while the terms of the transaction were not disclosed.
