= Techskills =

TechSkills is a nationally recognized career training school, specializing in skills and certification training for careers in Information Technology, Healthcare Services and Business. It is a private, for-profit provider of career training for adult learners. The company operates 18 campuses in 13 states in the United States.

== History ==
TechSkills was founded in 1996 as AmeriTrain by John Poland. Its first campus opened in Brookfield, Wisconsin in 1996. In 1999, the company was renamed TechSkills. Five new campuses were opened in 1999, with 12 campuses added in 2000, nine campuses in 2001, and one campus in 2002. TechSkills' corporate headquarters was relocated to Austin, Texas in 2001. Beginning in 2010, TechSkills LLC campuses began to see dramatic decline and began closing multiple campuses and selling other(s) to TechSkills of California (Las Vegas). More campus closures are expected throughout 2011-2012 respectively. More than 40,000 students have graduated from their programs.

== Campus locations ==
| State | City | Status |
|---|---|---|
| Arizona | Phoenix, Tempe/Mesa | Closed |
| California | Sacramento, San Francisco/Oakland, San Jose | Closed |
| Colorado | Greenwood Village (Denver) | Closed |
| Florida | Tampa | Closed |
| Indiana | Indianapolis | Closed |
| Kansas | Lenexa (Kansas City) | Closed |
| Minnesota | Bloomington (Minneapolis) | Closed |
| Missouri | St. Louis | Closed |
| Nevada | Las Vegas | Closed |
| North Carolina | Raleigh, Greensboro, Charlotte | Closed Greesboro, Charlotte |
| Ohio | Cincinnati, Columbus | Closed |
| Oklahoma | Oklahoma City | Closed |
| Texas | Dallas, Houston | Closed |
| Wisconsin | Brookfield (Milwaukee) | Closed |

== Accreditation ==
The following TechSkills campuses are nationally accredited by the Accrediting Council for Continuing Education & Training (ACCET): Brookfield, Charlotte, Cincinnati, Columbus, Kansas City, Las Vegas, Sacramento, and San Jose.

== Courses of study ==
TechSkills offers career education programs in Information Technology, Allied Health Services, Accounting & Bookkeeping, and Project Management. TechSkills students may pursue industry certification through Information Technology vendors including Microsoft, Cisco, Oracle, CompTIA, Prosoft, and (ISC)2; and through Health Services associations including the National Healthcareer Association and the Pharmacy Technician Certification Board. Information Technology graduates may enter careers in IT engineering, network design, software development, database administration, IT security, web design or computer hardware. Health Services graduates may enter careers in medical coding, medical billing, medical transcription, medical office administration or pharmacy.

== Learning model ==
TechSkills utilizes blended learning to deliver its education programs, and emphasizes flexibility and preparation for employment.
