= Paymentwall =

Payment service provider

Paymentwall Inc.
- Website type: Private
- Available in: Multilingual
- Founded: April 2010
- Headquarters: San Francisco, United States
- Area served: Worldwide
- Founders: Honor Gunday, Vladimir Kovalyov
- Industry: IT, Financial services
- Employees: 150+ (July 2015)
- Website: paymentwall.com
- Users: ▲200 thousand (2015)
- Current status: Active

Paymentwall Inc. is a payment service provider which services businesses in the Gaming, SaaS, travel, and e-commerce industries.

== History ==
Honor Gunday and Vladimir Kovalyov started Paymentwall in April 2010 to help game companies on Facebook monetize their global traffic.

On July 1, 2011, Facebook announced that they would no longer allow any outside monetization providers, at which point the company pivoted to providing services to non-Facebook games and online dating websites.

In 2011, the company entered into partnership with Alipay, a third-party mobile and online payment platform, established in Hangzhou, China in February 2004 by the Alibaba Group.

Paymentwall launched a payment system for Smart TVs in November 2014.

In 2018, Paymentwall spun out Terminal3 as a global payment platform for gaming companies.

== Offices ==
Paymentwall is headquartered in San Francisco, with offices in Berlin, Bangalore, Beijing, Bogota, Cancun, Gurgaon, Hanoi, Istanbul, Kyiv, Lisbon, London, Moscow, Manila, Seoul, Shenzhen, Cairo and Sofia.

In November 2015, the company unveiled its intergalactic-themed development lab in Kyiv.

In July 2019, the company officially announced its two new office locations in Bangalore and Gurgaon.
