= Oleksiy Skrypnyk =

Ukrainian politician (1964–2022)

- Олексій Скрипник
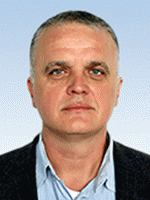
- Official portrait, 2014

People's Deputy of Ukraine
- In office 27 November 2014 – 29 August 2019
- Constituency: Self Reliance, No. 3

Personal details
- Born: 8 March 1964 Lviv, Ukrainian SSR, Soviet Union (now Ukraine)
- Died: 23 February 2022 (aged 57) Lviv, Ukraine
- Party: Self Reliance
- Education: Lviv Polytechnic

Oleksiy Oleksiyovych Skrypnyk (Ukrainian: Олексій Олексійович Скрипник, 8 March 1964 – 23 February 2022) was a Ukrainian politician. Appearing third on the party list of Self Reliance party, he was elected to the Verkhovna Rada in the 2014 Ukrainian parliamentary election. Formerly, he was the CEO of Eleks, resigning in November 2014. Skrypnyk did not return to parliament following the 2019 Ukrainian parliamentary election.

== Biography ==
Skrypnyk was born in Lviv on 8 March 1964, into a family of energy researchers.

In 1986 Skrypnyk graduated with honors from the Faculty of Electricity (department of electrical systems and networks) of the Lviv Polytechnic Institute.

Skrypnyk participated in the training program of the US government ''SABIT'' — ''Management of Software Companies".

In 1986-2000 he worked in "Lvivenergo" (since 1995 at the Western Regional Dispatch Center, since 1998 at the Western Power System). Skrypnyk used to be Engineer of the Central Dispatcher Service (CDS), then — the deputy chief of CDS on ASDC at the West regional control center Lvivenergo.

In 1991, with his father and mother, Oleksiy Skrypnyck and Evgeniia Skrypnyk founded the company LLC "ELEKS". From November 1991 to May 2000 he held the position of Technical Director at ELEKS. From June 2000 to 2010 he was the Director of ELEKS. From 2010 to 2014 Oleksiy served as a CEO of ELEKS.

In 2014 he resigned from this position following his election to the Parliament of Ukraine.

== Career in academia ==
Since 2008 Skrypnyk worked as a senior lecturer at the Institute of Computer Science and Information Technology of the National University "Lviv Polytechnic". He taught Project management of software development and Project Workshop.

He taught Project Management at the Kyiv Mohyla Business School [kmbs].

His research interests include the technology of programming and creating software.

== Civic activities ==
Skrypnyk was a member of the Entrepreneurs Committee and the Association "IT Ukraine".

He has included in the Supervisory Board Association "Lviv cluster of IT and business services". He participated in the development strategy of the economic development of the city based on a cluster of economic development.

Member of the Board of the National University "Lviv Polytechnic" and the Council on Competitiveness in the Lviv region.

== Political activities ==
In 2014 Skrypnyk participated in the parliamentary election campaign. He was third on the party list of Union ''Self Reliance''.

Since November 27, 2014 he was Member of Ukrainian parliament with the parliamentary fraction Union ''Self Reliance''.

On April 22, 2015, he became the Chairman of the Interim Verkhovna Rada "Commission on the future".

Skrypnyk did not take part in the 2019 Ukrainian parliamentary election.

== Areas of expertise ==
=== IT and new technologies ===
Oleksiy Skrypnyk has built one of the largest and most successful software companies in Ukraine — «ELEKS»

Today the company «ELEKS» employs about 1,000 people with an average age of 25. The firm's main office is in Lviv, with a network of development centers throughout Ukraine (Kyiv, Lviv, Ivano-Frankivsk, Ternopil), and abroad. ELEKS has an office in Poland as well as representative offices in the US and UK.

The company has its own educational center, the ELEKS Academy, where young specialists receive high-quality training before their employment in the company. ELEKS is known for cinema production, having collaborated with Hollywood on blockbusters Quantum of Solace and Spider-Man. Additionally, the company produces applications for automation and medical establishments (e.g. information system Doctor ELEKS). The company's activity is aimed at the international market: 95% of ELEKS customers come from abroad.

Oleksiy Skrypnyk initiated the modernization of the legislative procedure of the Ukrainian parliament, computerization and introduction of e-governance. He was also concerned with cyber security of the state.

=== National Security ===
As Deputy Chairman of the Permanent Delegation to the NATO Parliamentary Assembly and a member of the Ukrainian Inter-parliamentary NATO-Ukraine Council, Oleksiy Skrypnyk was avidly lobbying the USA and other Western countries to supply lethal weapons to Ukraine in the course of its anti-terrorist operation in the East. Also, he supported the prospect of NATO membership for Ukraine. He was collaborating with experts and with a group of MPs on military doctrine and laws on public-private partnerships in the military sphere.

=== Energetics ===
Skrypnyk specialized in the energy sector, where he worked for more than 14 years.

=== Science and education ===
As deputy chairman of the Verkhovna Rada of Ukraine on Science and Education, Skrypnyk was concerned with IT education and science issues in general. In particular, he proposed educational reform, which would abolish Computer Literacy lessons, introducing instead courses on programming for high school students.

== Initiatives ==
=== Commission for the Future ===
Temporary special "Commission for the Future" of the Verkhovna Rada of Ukraine was established on April 22, 2015. The Commission was created "to develop and promote innovative development strategy for Ukraine based on public and social priorities, of science and technology, and assessment of their impact on the harmonious development of the state".

Oleksiy Skrypnyk, MP was the chairman of the "Commission for the Future". The commission also includes:

Victor Vovk ("Radical Party of Oleh Lyashko");

Victor Galasyuk ("Radical Party Oleg Lyashko");

Victoria Voytsitska ("Samopomich Union");

Alexander Dombrowski ("Petro Poroshenko Bloc");

Svetlana Zalishchuk ("Petro Poroshenko Bloc");

Oleksiy Mushak ("Petro Poroshenko Bloc")

Lily Grinevich ("Narodnyi Front");

George Lohvynskyy ("Narodnyi Front");

Ivan Kyrylenko (VO "Fatherland").

The Commission in total has 11 members, representatives of all coalition factions. Every six months the Commission will prepare a report and announce it at the session of Parliament. Similar commissions exist in most parliaments of European countries.

== Personal life and death ==
Skrypnyk's father, Oleksiy Ivanovich, is a professor, and programmer with 40 years of experience, and co-founder of ELEKS. Mother, Skrypnyk Evgeniia is an electrical engineer, co-founder of ELEKS.

Skrypnyk was married. He had four sons and a daughter. In his spare time, he enjoyed running, swimming, yachting and cycling. He died of a blood clot on 23 February 2022, at the age of 57.
