= Innovecs =

Global technology company based in Miami

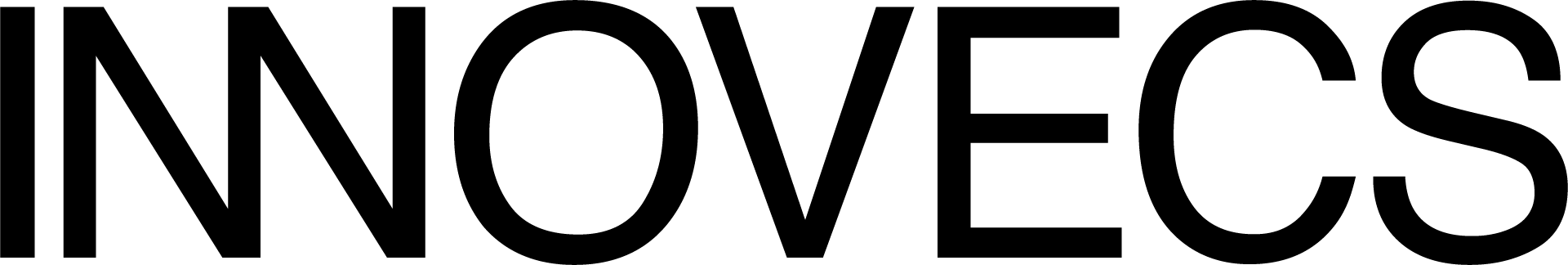
- Type: Private
- Industry: Technology
- Founded: 2011
- Founder: Alex Lutskiy
- Headquarters: Miami, US
- Number of employees: 800+
- Website: Innovecs

Innovecs is a global technology company founded by Alex Lutskiy in 2011. Headquartered in Miami, the company employs over 800 people. It operates in the US, the UK, the EU, Latin America, Israel, Australia, and Ukraine.

== History ==
Innovecs was established in September 2011 in Kyiv, Ukraine, focusing on digital services.

In 2017–2021, Innovecs was included in the Inc. 5000 rating, the list of the fastest-growing private companies in the US. In 2017–2023, the company was included in The Global Outsourcing 100 list by the International Association of Outsourcing Professionals (IAOP). In 2018, Innovecs acquired the outsourcing division of Ukrainian mobile game development company Tatem Games to expand into video game development. In 2021, Innovecs partnered with Ice Hockey Federation of Ukraine (FHU) to design and build the digital platform for the Federation. In March 2021, Innovecs earned the Amazon Web Services (AWS) Select Consulting Partner and Advanced Tier Partner in 2024.

In October 2021, Innovecs became the Platinum Partner of the International Software Testing Qualifications Board (ISTQB). After the Russian invasion of Ukraine on February 24, 2022, Innovecs actively supported Ukraine, including support to the Medical battalion "Hospitallers" and the "Leleka" Foundation, as well as providing support to the Armed Forces of Ukraine. In December 2022, it introduced Innovecs Games as a sub-brand in the game development market. In December 2023 – January 2024, Innovecs established a strategic partnerships with Davanti Warehousing and SAVOYE in the supply chain sector.

== Other ==
In August 2018, Innovecs opened InnoHub, a 600 m2 multimedia environment for educational activities in business and technology. Later, InnoHub transformed into an Engineering Leadership Platform for collaboration and networking for engineering leaders. In 2019, it launched the InnoCamp training platform.

After the Russian invasion of Ukraine on February 24, 2022, Innovecs actively supported Ukraine Defence Forces.
