= Stefanini IT Solutions =

Brazilian software company

Stefanini IT Solutions Ltda.
- Company type: Limitada
- Industry: Software
- Founded: 1987
- Founder: Marco Stefanini
- Headquarters: São Paulo, São Paulo, Brazil
- Revenue: ▲US$ 1.4 billion (2024)
- Number of employees: 32.000
- Website: stefanini.com

The Stefanini (Stefanini Consultoria e Assessoria em Informática S.A.) is a private Brazilian multinational, service and software provider, for data processing and consulting, based in Jaguariúna, São Paulo.

Stefanini was founded in 1987 by current global CEO Marco Stefanini.

The global headquarters is located in Sao Paulo, Brazil, with European headquarters in Brussels, Belgium, and North American headquarters in Southfield, MI.
