= DOU.ua =

DOU
- Available in: Ukrainian, English
- Creator: Max Ischenko
- Website: https://dou.ua/
- Commercial: Yes

DOU (developers.org.ua) is a Ukrainian online community and media platform dedicated to the IT industry, covering news, surveys, and discussions among software developers and other technology professionals.

== History ==
The entire site receives more than 3 million page views per month.

DOU is also known for conducting various surveys and research, such as salary analytics for Ukrainian IT specialists, rating of the largest product companies, the IT specialist portrait, the number of employees in Ukrainian IT companies, employer ratings, programming language rankings, and more.

The official DOU logo has two versions of its decoding. The first is an abbreviation for Developers of Ukraine. The second — the site's address was formerly developers.org.ua, which was later shortened to dou.ua.

== Fundraising ==
In 2022, following the start of Russia's full-scale invasion of Ukraine, DOU organized fundraising efforts for the Armed Forces of Ukraine. Over the year, the DOU community raised over 93 million hryvnia.

== See also ==
- Djinni.co
