= Tieto =

Finnish IT software and service company

Tieto Corporation
- Native name: Tieto Oyj
- Formerly: Tietoenator (1999–2009); Tietoevry (2019–2026)
- Type: Julkinen osakeyhtiö
- Traded as: Nasdaq Helsinki: TIETO; Nasdaq Stockholm: TIETOS
- Industry: IT services, IT consulting
- Founded: 1968; 58 years ago
- Headquarters: Espoo, Finland
- Key people: Tomas Franzén (Chairman), Endre Rangnes (President and CEO)
- Services: IT, business consulting and outsourcing services
- Revenue: ▲€2.786 billion (2020)
- Operating income: ▲€146.7 million (2020)
- Net income: ▲€94.5 million (2020)
- Total assets: ▼€3.604 billion (end 2020)
- Total equity: ▼€1626.2 million (end 2020)
- Number of employees: ▼15,000 (FTE, 2025)
- Website: www.tieto.com

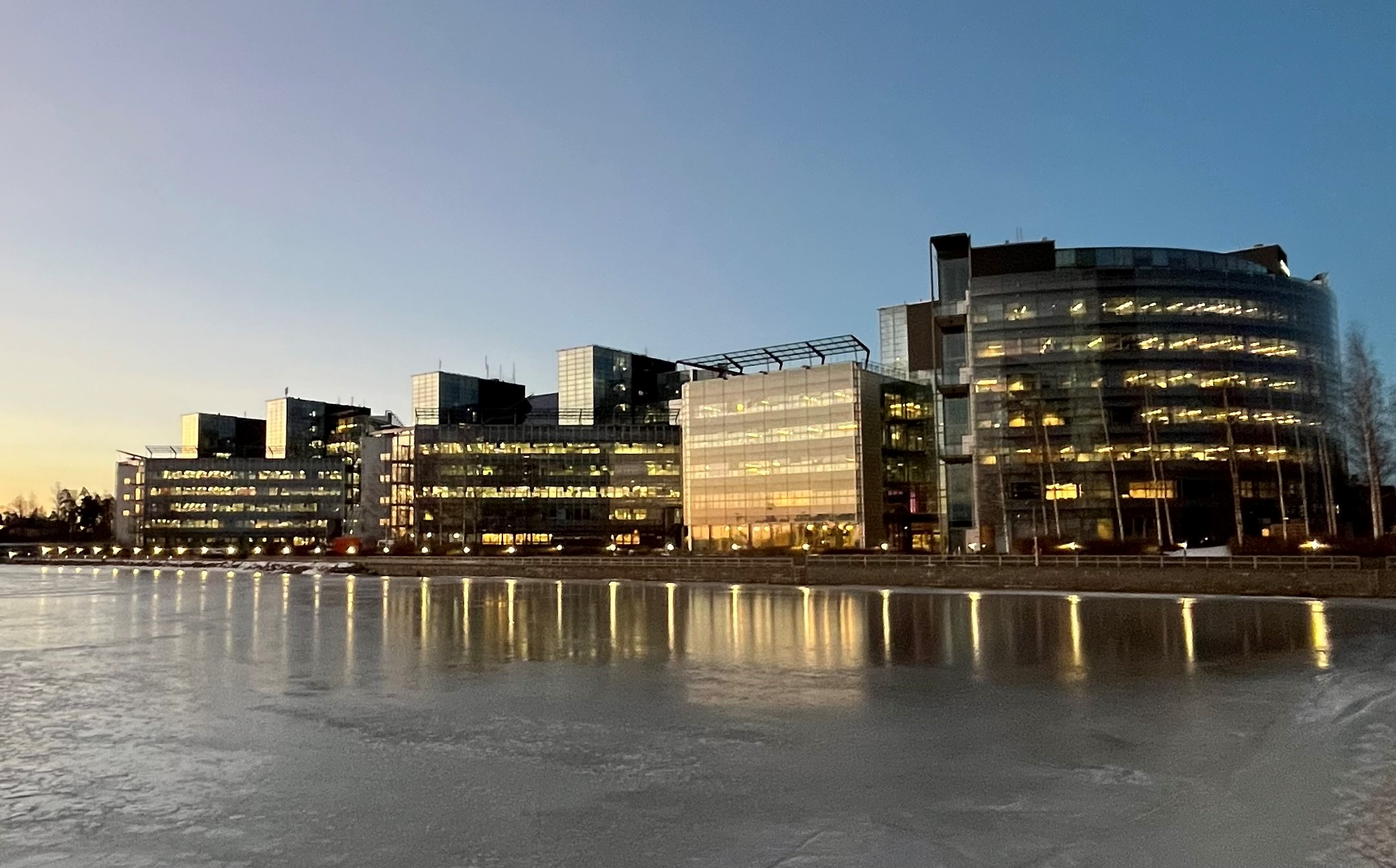
Tieto global headquarters in Keilaniemi, Espoo, Finland, since 2016. Keilalahdentie 2-4, Espoo.

Tieto Corporation (formerly Tietoenator and Tietoevry) is a Finnish IT software and service company providing IT and product engineering services. Tieto is domiciled in Espoo, Finland, and the company's shares are listed on the NASDAQ OMX Helsinki, NASDAQ OMX Stockholm and Oslo Stock Exchange. Tieto has approximately 15,000 employees across 20 countries, and has customers in the energy, forestry, banking, healthcare and public sectors.

== History ==
=== Finland and corporate origins 1968–2008 ===
Tietoenator logo used from 1999 to 2009

Tieto started its business operations in Espoo, Finland, in 1968 under the name Tietotehdas Oy. During the company's first years, it developed and maintained IT systems mainly for the Union Bank of Finland (later merged into Nordea), its customers and a few forestry companies.

The customer base of the company grew during the 1970s, when mini-computers were introduced alongside the existing mainframe computers. Besides mainframe computer services and software, the development of IT systems was also central to the operations of Tietotehdas. Customers represented several industries and operations were organized according to these verticals. During the 1990s, the company experienced rapid growth through a number of acquisitions, mergers and strategic alliances. The company's name was changed from Tietotehdas to TT Tieto in 1995 and Tieto in 1998. In 1996, the company strengthened its exposure in the telecom sector considerably through the acquisition of Avancer. In 1999, Tieto and the Swedish Enator corporation merged to form TietoEnator.

=== Tieto 2008–2018 ===
On 1 December 2008, the company re-launched the corporate brand and marketing name Tieto (which means knowledge in Finnish). The official registered name became Tieto Corporation, and the corporation is led from its Helsinki headquarters. Starting from year 2009, Tieto went with an aggressive strategy of offshore production, reaching up to the end of the decade. Kimmo Alkio started as the president and CEO of Tieto in November 2011.

In December 2015, Tieto signed an agreement to acquire Smilehouse, the largest Finnish solution provider of multichannel commerce with operations primarily in Finland and Sweden. Before the acquisition, Smilehouse's annual sales amounted to approximately EUR 10 million. Smilehouse was consolidated into Tieto on 1 December 2015.

In November 2015, Tieto acquired Imano AB, a Swedish consulting company offering consulting and digitalization services to paper and forestry industries. The acquisition was made to support Tieto's objective of becoming the largest IT services provider in the paper and forestry industries in Sweden and Norway. The company's revenue in 2014 was EUR 7.1 million.

In June 2015, Tieto signed an agreement to acquire Software Innovation, a content management system software company. In 2014, Software Innovation's net sales amounted to approximately EUR 41 million with an operating margin (EBIT) of 12.5%. In August 2015, The Norwegian Competition Authority approved the acquisition.

In December 2015, Tieto announced the relocation of its headquarters in Keilaniemi, Espoo, Finland, in space originally built for Nokia and later occupied by Microsoft Mobile. The office spaces in Keilaniemi are designed for flexible ways of working, with open spaces, co-creative areas and innovation hubs. The move to Keilaniemi is planned to take place in stages, starting in the fourth quarter of 2016; the move has been ongoing since April 2017. Since Tieto's rental agreement in Kilo, Espoo, ends in December 2016, the company expects that the move will have both logistical and financial benefits.

At the end of 2015, the number of full-time employees was over 13,000 in more than 20 countries. 28% are located in Finland, 19% in Sweden, 17% in India, 15% in Czech Republic, 5% in Latvia, and the rest spread across other countries. 28% of the employees worldwide are women. Net sales by country was Finland 47%, Sweden 36%, and International 17%. As of 2014, 42.7% of Tieto's shareholders are Finnish and 3% are Swedish and 1% Bulgarian.

=== Tietoevry 2019–2026 ===
Tietoevry logo used from 2025 to 2026

In June 2019, Tieto paid 1.2 billion pounds for the acquisition of similar-sized IT company EVRY. The intention was to expand on the Nordic market. The new company would be named TietoEVRY, have over 24.000 employees and generate a projected revenue of over EUR 3 billion for the fiscal year 2020.

In early 2025, Tietoevry sold its Tech Services business unit to the private equity firm Agilitas. In July, Endre Rangnes was appointed as the president and CEO of Tietoevry. The Agilitas deal was confirmed in September. The new company was named Vivicta.

In November 2025, the company announced a rebrand back to the name Tieto to reflect a sharpened focus on core vertical software and digital consulting businesses. As part of its current structure, Tieto is organized into four specialized business units:

- Tieto Banktech (formerly Tietoevry Banking)
- Tieto Caretech (formerly Tietoevry Care)
- Tieto Indtech (formerly Tietoevry Industry)
- Tieto Tech Consulting (formerly Tietoevry Create)

== International operations ==
Currently, Tieto operates in more than 20 countries, with Finland, Norway and Sweden as the main markets. The company's major delivery centres are located in the Czech Republic, Poland, India and China. Tieto also has operations in the Baltics (Estonia, Latvia, Lithuania), Canada, Denmark, Germany, Great Britain, Malaysia, the Netherlands and the United States.

=== Tieto Norway ===
Tieto operates in Norway as the subsidiary Tieto Norway AS. The business in Norway was developed through a series of acquisitions, starting in 1989 when Enator AB acquired the Norwegian IT consulting company ISI AS.

Other significant acquisitions were Ementor Financial Systems in February 2002, followed by DaWinci Services AS in December of that year. The latter acquisition provided control over the offshore Personnel Transportation & Tracking Solution, giving Tieto Norway a 100% market share of systems for operating the Norwegian Continental Shelf personnel movements.

In 2010, there was a major demerger by a group of Tieto Norway employees that spun off the company Hytracc Consulting. The new company has established partner offices in the vicinity of the Tieto's offices, hence both companies provide services for shared customers of the Tieto Energy Components system.

==== Lawsuit claims in Norway 2007 ====
In 2005, the Western Norway Regional Health Authority, Norwegian Helse Vest RHF, signed an agreement with TietoEnator Norway for the delivery of a system for electronic health records. By the end of 2007, Helse Vest RHF concluded its customer relationship with the company and announced a lawsuit against TietoEnator. They claimed that they had spent time, resources and efforts on the initial project without seeing TietoEnator able to deliver, and thus they were going to claim compensation from TietoEnator. "The word disaster is appropriate", Eric Hansen of Helse Vest RHF expressed to Finansavisen. Likewise, the Southern Norway Regional Health Authority, Helse Sør, experienced their frame agreement from 2004 to make no deliveries, and Helse Sør therefore also considered legal action. For the 2007 fiscal year, TietoEnator Norway recorded a loss of NOK 124,336,000 (according to the net loss indicated on their financial statement, as reported to the Brønnøysund Register Centre).

While TietoEnator Norway employed more than 1000 people in 2002, there was a further decline in the number of Tieto Norway employees from 669 to 477 between 2007 and 2011.

=== Tieto Sweden ===
The current business activities in Sweden are undertaken by the subsidiary Tieto Sweden AB based on a restructuring of the former Enator corporation. Enator corporation started in 1977 as a consultant firm created to support the Pronator company with software and project management. In 1990, it merged with Modulföretagen, adopting its logo from Modul and name from Enator. Enator grew to approximately 650 consultants in Sweden, Denmark, Norway and Finland. In 1993, it was included in the AxData group as a stand-alone company but was sold to Celsius in 1995. The subsidiary's name, Enator, was applied to the whole group in 1995 when Celsius AB, a publicly traded Swedish company, merged the IT operations it had acquired between 1991 and 1994. Until 1994, there were IT operations in three separate subsidiaries: Telub, Enator and Dialog. The merger of the three subsidiaries led to a restructuring program in 1997. In spring 1996, the corporation was listed on the Stockholm Stock Exchange under the name of Enator.

During 1998, Enator conducted a series of acquisitions to strengthen the company's public sector exposure. The company acquired 51% of shares in the Stockholm-based consulting firm Programmera. In addition, the company acquired two small IT companies – Kvatro Telecom in Trondheim, Norway, and Soft Project in Hamburg, Germany – and divested from operations in Enator Telecom Mechanics. In April 1999, Enator acquired NetDesign in Denmark. After the Enator–Tieto merger in July 1999, the Enator brand was discontinued.

==== Data center failure in Sweden ====
On 25 November 2011, there was a hardware failure in one of Tieto's Swedish data centers, which affected approximately 50 of its clients, including Apoteket (a national pharmaceuticals retail firm, for whom e-prescriptions were out of service), Bilprovningen (a Swedish motor vehicle inspection firm, which was forced to perform inspections with manual support), SBAB Bank and the Stockholm Municipality school web site. Kristina Westerlind, Head of Marketing and Communications at Tieto Sweden, commented on the incident to Dagens Nyheter: "It is a hardware failure that is very difficult to predict at this time how long it takes to restore everything to normal. It can go fast or it could last a long time." On 30 November, Tieto services for Apoteket e-prescriptions and SBAB were recovered and operational again. By 13 December, virtually all services were back to normal operations. Confidentiality agreements with customers prevented Tieto from revealing exactly who was affected by this incident. On 22 February 2012, the Swedish Civil Contingencies Agency published the report on Reflections on community safety and preparedness for serious IT incidents In March 2012, Tieto released a report investigating the incident.

=== Former international operations ===
==== Tieto Global Oy (Philippine Branch) ====
An award-winning former Telecom R&D for Tieto but was closed due to the lone client's decision to insource the project.
