= Gennadi Skripnik =

Uzbekistani footballer

Personal information
- Date of birth: 30 August 1962 (age 64)
- Height: 1.82 m (5 ft 11 1/2 in)
- Positions: Defender; midfielder

Senior career*
Years	Team	Apps	(Gls)
1985	FC Spartak Zhytomyr	35	(2)
1987–1990	FC Kasansayets Kasansai	145	(27)
1991	Navbahor Namangan	34	(3)
1992	FC Dynamo Stavropol	10	(1)
1992	FC Spartak Anapa	5	(0)
1992–1994	Navbahor Namangan	39	(7)
- * Club domestic league appearances and goals

Gennadi Skripnik (Russian: Геннадий Скрипник; born 30 August 1962) is a former Uzbekistani football player.

== Honours ==
Navbahor Namangan

- Uzbekistan Cup winner: 1992
- Uzbek League bronze: 1993, 1994
- Uzbekistan Cup runner-up: 1993
