= Eleks =

Ukrainian IT company

ELEKS
- Company type: Private
- Industry: Software engineering, Outsourcing
- Founded: 1991
- Headquarters: Tallinn, Estonia
- Area served: Globally
- Key people: Oleksiy Skrypnyk; (Co-Founder); Andriy Krupa; (CEO)
- Number of employees: 2100+
- Website: eleks.com

ELEKS is an international company that provides custom software engineering and consulting services, headquartered in Tallinn, Estonia. The company has about 2100+ employees and operates offices in the United States, Canada, Germany, Ukraine, Poland, Switzerland, Japan, Croatia, UAE, KSA and the United Kingdom. ELEKS is recognised on the Global Outsourcing 100 list by the International Association of Outsourcing Professionals (IAOP).

== History ==
ELEKS was established as a product company in 1991 by Oleksiy Skrypnyk and his son Oleksiy Skrypnyk, Jr. The company started with the launch of Dakar, a science-intensive software for power distribution systems for Eastern European markets.

By 2016, Dakar was used in more than 20 Eastern European power systems, and by 2019, the company had 1400 employees. As of 2019, more than 200 companies are using the services of the company.

== Services and industries ==
ELEKS specializes in custom software development and IT consulting for enterprise clients.

== Contribution to Ukraine’s e-Excise modernisation initiative ==
In October 2024, ELEKS was chosen through a competitive tender by Ukraine’s Digital Transformation Activity to implement the national e-Excise electronic stamp system. This project—developed in collaboration with the Ministry of Digital Transformation, Ministry of Finance, and State Tax Service—replaces paper excise stamps with traceable, DataMatrix-enabled digital stamps to boost transparency and streamline the regulation of alcohol and tobacco products through integration with the Diia mobile application.

The company supports the Ukrainian armed forces by developing software and hardware for military drones.
