= DataArt =

IT consulting company

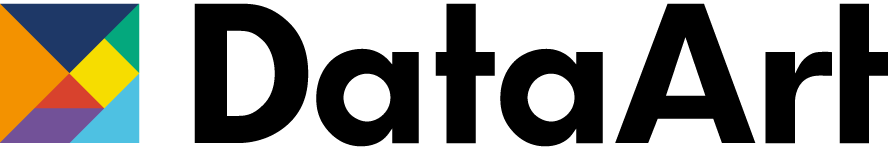
- Type: Business network of private companies
- Industry: Software engineering
- Founded: 1997
- Founder: Eugene Goland
- Headquarters: New York City, United States
- Area served: Globally
- Key people: Eugene Goland, CEO; Alexei Miller, Managing Director, US; Yuri Gubin, CIO
- Products: Software Development; Data Platform Development; Artificial intelligence
- Number of employees: 6000+ (September 2025)
- Website: www.dataart.com

DataArt is a New York City-based IT consultancy company. The firm delivers breakthrough data, analytics, and AI platforms for various industries, including finance, media & entertainment, healthcare & life sciences, retail, and travel & hospitality. DataArt operates from 30+ locations in the US, Europe (Armenia, Bulgaria, Germany, Georgia, Kazakhstan, Poland, Romania, Switzerland, Ukraine), the UK, Latin America, and the UAE.

== History ==
DataArt was founded in 1997 in New York City by Eugene Goland, president and CEO. It started as and remains a U.S. (New York) corporation.

In 2001, the company opened a London office.

In 2007, DataArt received Microsoft Gold Certified Partner status. This was attained by participating in the Microsoft Customer Satisfaction Index (CSI) program, where the company received high customer ratings and earned the status of Small Business Specialist.

In 2011, DataArt became a member of the American Chamber of Commerce in Ukraine.

In 2014, DataArt acquired AW Systems and launched a development center in Buenos Aires, i.e. it entered Argentina.

In 2018–2019, Da Vinci Capital and German state-owned development finance institution DEG invested in the company. An important reason for the investment was that DataArt employed over a thousand IT professionals in Ukraine, mitigating brain drain risks. It was a strategic investment as the institutions work on promoting sustainable economic development in Ukraine, Argentina, and Armenia.

In 2021, DataArt opened an additional R&D center in Bulgaria (Plovdiv) and new offices were opened in Kazakhstan and Georgia. In September of that same year, the company acquired the Armenian-based software development company SFL.

In 2022, due to the Russian invasion of Ukraine, DataArt left the Russian market on 15 June, i.e. it closed its offices in Russia.

In September 2022, DataArt announced the acquisition of Lola Tech, thus entering the software development market in Romania. Lola Tech's Cluj-Napoca hub becomes the first development centre in Romania.

In May 2023, DataArt opened a new office in India, followed two months later by the opening of another office in Mexico. That same year, the company was recognized as one of Newsweek’s Top 100 Global Most Loved Workplace.

In 2024, DataArt was recognized as a leader in the IAOP Global Outsourcing 100. In July of the same year, the company launched its Advanced AI Strategy Consulting Service, designed to drive organizational transformation.

== Awards and recognition ==
From 2010 to 2018, the company was ranked in the Inc. 5000 List of the fastest-growing private U.S. companies.

In 2021, DataArt appeared among the Inc. 5000 America's Fastest-Growing private companies and was included on Best Company Culture list by Comparably.

In 2022, DataArt was recognized on the Inc. 5000 list for the 11th time.

In 2023, DataArt was named one of the Americas’ Fastest-Growing Companies by the Financial Times and made its 12th appearance on the Inc. 5000 list, placing it among the top 0.1% of companies with this achievement. DataArt was also recognized as one of Newsweek's Top 100 Global Most Loved Workplaces. Additionally, Eugene Goland, CEO of DataArt, was honored as one of the Top 25 IT Services Executives of 2023.

In 2024, DataArt was included as a leader in the Global Outsourcing 100 list, recognized by the Association for Talent Development (ATD) in the 2024 BEST Awards for excellence in talent development, and named the Best Global Software Engineering Company – US at the 2024 Technology Innovator Awards.

== Product ==
DataArt specializes in product development, system modernization, security service, managed support, digital transformation.
