= Vasyl Khmelnytsky =

Ukrainian politician and entrepreneur

- Василь Хмельницький
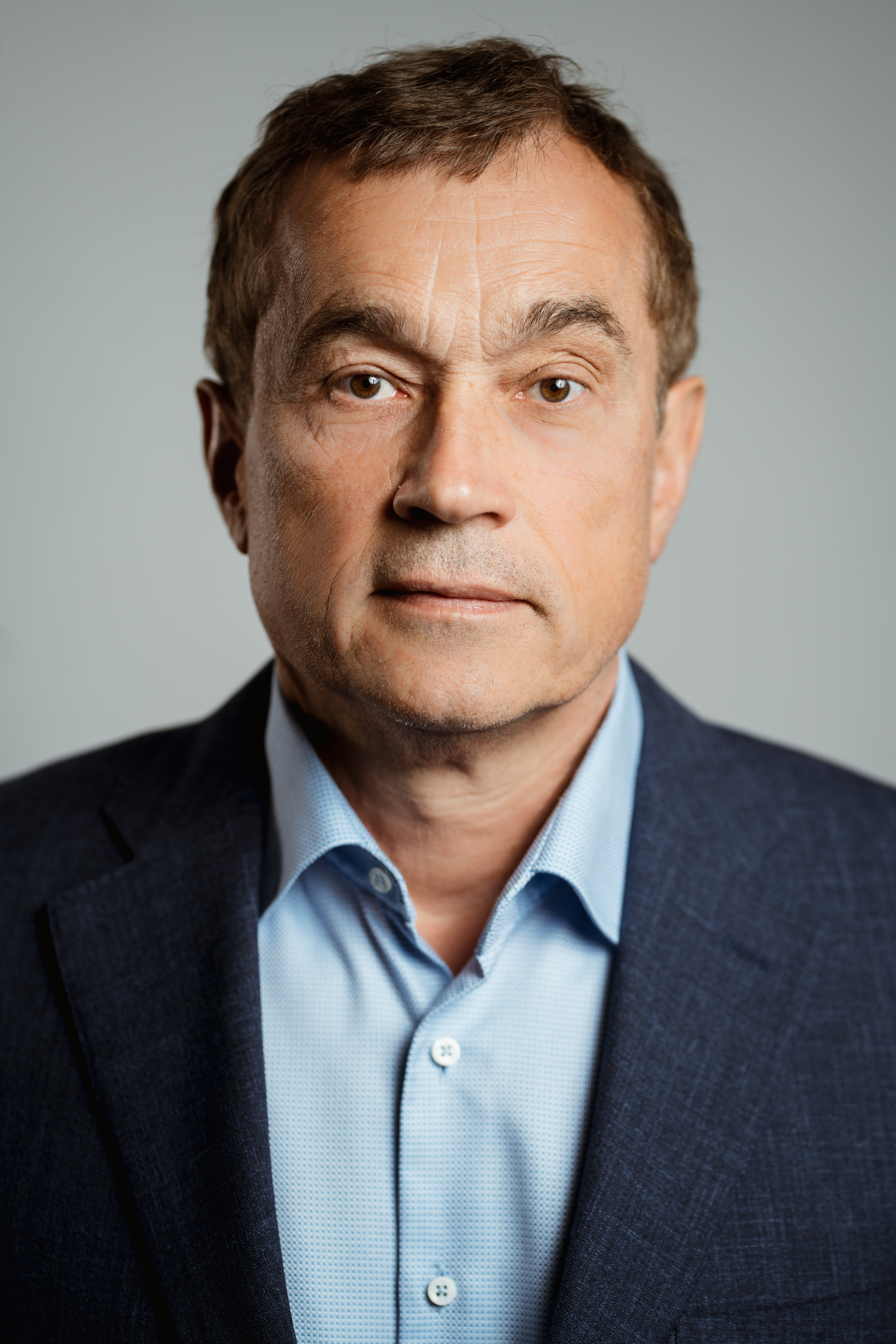

People's Deputy of Ukraine
- In office 12 May 1998 – 14 May 2002
- Constituency: Party of Greens of Ukraine, No. 3
- In office 25 May 2006 – 27 November 2014
- Constituency: Yulia Tymoshenko Bloc, No. 60 (2006–2007); Party of Regions, No. 100 (2007–2012); Party of Regions, No. 37 (2012–2014)

Personal details
- Born: 10 September 1966 (age 59) Bayanaul, Kazakh SSR, Soviet Union (now Kazakhstan)
- Party: Party of Greens of Ukraine (1998–2002); Yulia Tymoshenko Bloc (2006–2007); Party of Regions (from 2007)
- Spouse: Zoya Lytvyn
- Children: Oleksandr, Ivan
- Occupation: Ukrainian entrepreneur, founder of holding company UFuture

Vasyl Ivanovych Khmelnytsky (Ukrainian: Василь Іванович Хмельницький; born 10 September 1966,) is a Ukrainian politician and entrepreneur who served as a People's Deputy of Ukraine on two occasions, first from 1998 to 2002 and then from 2006 to 2014. He is also the founder of holding company UFuture.

== Biography ==
Khmelnytsky was born in Kazakhstan, in the village of Bayanaul, Pavlodar Region. His father was a tractor driver, and his mother was a house-painter.

In 1984 he graduated from the technical vocational school majoring in "fitter welder" in the city of Vatutine, Cherkasy Oblast. In 1987–1991, after a military service in the Soviet Army, he worked as a gas electric welder and a foreman at the construction and assembly department in Leningrad. In 1991–1998, he worked as: Head of the Information-Analytical Department at the Orimi Wood Soviet-American Joint Venture (Leningrad), CEO at JSC Danapris, Head of the Information-Analytical Department at JSC Real-Group. In 2002, he graduated from the Faculty of Law of Taras Shevchenko National University of Kyiv.

== Business and investment ==
Khmelnytsky began creating his business empire from traditional sectors, such as real estate and infrastructure, later he started investing in pharmaceutical production, renewable energy and high technologies and innovations.

From 2004 to 2008 he extensively invested, buying and selling his own assets. In 2006, an effective sale of a majority stake in the Zaporizhstal metallurgical plant took place. This transaction brought Khmelnytsky $400 million.

Explaining the reasons for the sale of Zaporizhstal, Vasyl Khmelnytsky said:

«When I realized that China chose the option of steel production development, it became apparent that before long there would be no place left for anyone else in this business»

In 2013, the Focus magazine estimated Vasily Khmelnytsky's wealth at $888.6 million (ranked 21st in the 200 Richest People of Ukraine Rating). In 2015 Forbes ranked Khmelnytsky 35th on Forbes Top 100 Richest with a fortune of $148 million. According to the rating of the Korrespondent magazine he takes 73rd place on the list of the most influential people of Ukraine.

Vasyl Khmelnytsky joined the Ukrainian League of Industrialists and Entrepreneurs (ULIE) in a position of a vice-president in 2014. Since 2015, as the First Vice-president of ULIE, he has been actively involved in the promotion of Ukraine in the global arena, attracting foreign investments, technology and expertise to Ukraine, developing manufacturing and regional projects. At the beginning of 2019 he gave up his power in the ULIE in order to fully concentrate on the development of business and social projects of his holding company UFuture.

At the European Business Summit on 2 June 2016, Vasyl Khmelnytsky presented a strategy for the development of Ukrainian regions exemplified by Bila Tserkva, until 2025. The project involves attracting $250 million investment, creating seven thousand jobs, an industrial park, a technological cluster and a business incubator.

On 16 June 2016 in Beijing, he took part in establishing the Belt & Road Industrial and Commercial Alliance (BRICA).

"We always preferred working in partnership. We believe that this reduces risks and increases revenue. Almost in all projects from 25% to 60% belongs to our partners" – V. Khmelnytsky, Kommersant Ukraine.

"It is our intention that our partners view our country not only as a transit zone for the supply of goods to Europe, but also as a platform for the creation of new industries", said Vasyl Khmelnytsky, the First Vice President of ULIE, in Beijing.

In the ULIE Khmelnytsky supervises the promotion of the investment potential of Ukraine, in particular, the attraction of foreign capital and solutions and the development of regional projects. He is a proponent of construction of new modern industrial production entities and creation of industrial parks in the country.

"When the country’s economy starts to grow, all assets, including mine and other businessmen's, will become more costly. We will become richer. This is the business model; people are not aware that the projects are not created for profit here and now. Our projects have longer than a ten-year horizon," stated Vasyl Khmelnytsky.

He is the majority shareholder at the UDP company. As of 2018, the UDP company has launched construction projects with an area of more than 3 million square meters and has become one of the largest real estate developers and infrastructure enterprises in the country. Among its most famous projects are the construction of Ocean Plaza Mall, Novopecherski Lypky, Boulevard of Fountains, RiverStone and Parkove Misto residential complexes.

In addition to UDP, the group owns or operates Igor Sikorsky Kyiv International Airport (Zhuliany), the RTM-Ukraine Group, Ukrainian national operator of outdoor advertising, and Bila Tserkva industrial park. Apart from commercial projects, Vasyl Khmelnytsky supports numerous social initiatives in the fields of education and economy whose objective is to promote Ukraine's competitiveness in world markets, for example, UNIT.City and LvivTech.City innovation parks, the unique educational UNIT Factory (Ukrainian National IT Factory); Osvitoriya public organization projects: Novopechersky school (comprehensive school) in Kyiv and iLearn online platform for orphans and children from low-income families; K.Fund Books publishing project; Small and Medium Entrepreneurship School (SME School), Lean Institute Ukraine (LIU) and K.Fund Media as information resource about new opportunities.

Vasyl Khmelnytsky is also the chairman of the supervisory board at National Technical University “Kharkiv Polytechnic Institute”. "Every year, our top managers and I visit the world top universities and the most innovative companies to adopt the unrivalled expertise and breakthrough approaches and apply them in Ukraine," he notes. The entrepreneur is sure that only education and a different way of thinking of Ukrainian citizens can speed up the country's development, helps achieve prosperity and take a proper place in the modern world.

In 2017, the Ukrainian journal Novoye Vremya placed him on Top 100 Richest Ukrainians at 36th place with $114 million.

As of July 2018, the value of assets belonging to the holding company Ufuture was $750 million.

Vasyl Khmelnytsky and his partners invested $42 million in the research and production facility of Biopharma LLC. The opening of the new complex took place in summer 2018.

== Political activity ==
Khmelnytsky was a People's Deputy of Ukraine in four convocations. He was elected to the Verkhovna Rada for the first time in 1998, representing the Party of Greens of Ukraine. In the 2002 Ukrainian parliamentary election he failed to get reelected in Ukraine's 82nd electoral district as an independent politician. Four years later he returned to the Verkhovna Rada as a member of the Yuliya Tymoshenko Bloc. In the 2007 Ukrainian parliamentary election he was reelected as a member of Party of Regions. In the 2012 Ukrainian parliamentary election Khmelnytsky was elected as number 37 on the national election list of the Party of Regions. He completed his political activities as a member of the Sovereign European Ukraine deputy group.

During the parliamentary elections in Ukraine in 2014 he did not run for election. He was one of the deputies voted for "Anti-protest laws in Ukraine" in January 2014. He left political activity in 2015. As of July 2018, he does not belong to any political party.

== Family ==
- Wife – Zoya Lytvyn, Head at Osvitoria NGO
- Sons: Oleksandr (born in 1993), Ivan (born in 2007).
