= Information technology consulting =

Field that focuses on advising businesses on how best to use information technology

In management, information technology consulting (also called IT consulting, computer consultancy, business and technology services, computing consultancy, technology consulting, and IT advisory) is a field of activity which focuses on advising organizations on how best to use information technology (IT) in achieving their business objectives and goals, but it can also refer more generally to IT outsourcing, especially in the context of larger companies.

An engagement typically begins when an organization identifies a technology-related need. A decision maker then defines the project's scope, budget, and timeline. The consulting firm is responsible for guiding the project from initiation through delivery, with the goal of meeting the agreed requirements on time and within budget.

== See also ==
- List of major IT consulting firms
- Consultant
- Outsourcing
