= Mike Salvino =

American business executive

- Education: Marietta College (BS)
- Occupations: General Manager at Duke Baseball and Adjunct Professor at the Pratt School of Engineering
- Children: 3
- Website: https://goduke.com/sports/baseball/roster/staff/mike-salvino/461

Michael J. Salvino (born July 28, 1965) is currently the General Manager of Duke Baseball and an Adjunct Professor teaching business leadership at the Pratt School of Engineering. He is the former Chairman, President, and CEO of DXC Technology. According to current DXC Chairman of the Board, Salvino "stabilized the business and put the Company on a path for growth, overseeing a meaningful restructuring of the operations and balance sheet, while launching the DXC offering-led operating model and building a world-class leadership team".

== Education ==
Salvino attended Marietta College, where he earned a Bachelor of Science in industrial engineering in 1987. Salvino was a starter for the Marietta Pioneers, the school’s basketball team, where he was a forward.

== Career ==
Salvino’s first major position was with Andersen Consulting, where he became an associate partner in 1997. He later left the company for Exult Inc. By 2003, he had been promoted to executive vice-president for North American client sales and accounts at Exult, and by April 2004, he was the company’s president for the Americas region. Before he left for Accenture in 2006, Salvino had been appointed global sales and accounts co-leader for Hewitt's human resources outsourcing group, which had acquired Exult.

Salvino joined Accenture in 2006 to serve as managing director of business process outsourcing (BPO). In September 2009, he was named group chief executive of business process outsourcing.

In 2014, Salvino became group chief executive of Accenture operations. As of 2016, when he left Accenture Operations, Salvino supervised 100,000 employees, with the division generating $7 billion in annual revenue.

In 2016, Salvino joined Carrick Capital Partners as one of the firm’s operating partners. He later became a managing director. While at Carrick, Salvino served as Executive Chairman at InfiniaML, an established leader in AI and Machine Learning.

In May 2019, Salvino joined the board of directors of DXC Technology, and in September of that same year, he became CEO of the company.

In 2020, Salvino oversaw a deal to sell DXC's state and local health and human services business to Veritas Capital for $5 billion.

In 2021, Salvino rejected an offer from French IT firm Atos to acquire DXC. Salvino said the bid undervalued the company based on recent quarterly gains.

In May 2022, Salvino was appointed as the chairman of DXC's board, taking over Ian Read following his retirement in July 2022.

From April 2020-March 2023, under Salvino's leadership the Fortune 500 company and publicly traded entity on the NYSE delivered consistent financial performance, including three-year total shareholder return (TSR) performance at 113.7%, far outpacing the GICS 4510 companies at 25.4% and the S&P 500 over the same time frame.

He stepped down as CEO in December 2023 but remained involved through March 2024.

Since 2024, he has taught Engineering 190 at Duke University's Pratt School of Engineering.

In 2025, he became a minority owner of the Tampa Bay Rays through Temerity Baseball’s ownership group, extending his lifelong passion for sports, teamwork, and community impact into Major League Baseball.

In February 2026, Salvino was named General Manager of Duke Baseball, bringing his Fortune 500 leadership experience to focus on building championship teams while also mentoring student-athletes on how to grow their personal brands and prepare for professional careers beyond the game.

=== Other professional activities ===
Salvino was recognized as an International Association of Outsourcing Professionals Hall of Fame award winner in 2014.

As of 2021, Salvino also serves on multiple boards outside of DXC Technology, including those of the Atrium Health Foundation, Marietta College, and the Duke University Pratt School of Engineering. Salvino delivered the 2021 commencement address for Marietta’s graduating class and was awarded an honorary doctorate degree.

As of 2024, he also serves on the board of The Josephinum, which is a Roman Catholic seminary and private pontifical college located in the Columbus, Ohio. In 1892, Pope Leo XIII granted it pontifical status, making it the only pontifical seminary outside Italy.

== Philanthropy ==
Salvino has actively established and supported philanthropic causes, often alongside his family:

- Through his family foundation, 5MPOWER, he launched the Carolinas Bladder Cancer Fund in 2012 to support bladder cancer treatment and research at the Levine Cancer Institute with Atrium Health Foundation.
- His children launched “Cougars 4 a Cure,” which ran for nine years and raised significant funds for bladder cancer research at the Levine Cancer Institute.
- He and his family established the Salvino Family/Accenture Brain Cancer Fund at Ohio State University.
- He is a major contributor to the Knothole Foundation in Charlotte, North Carolina, whose mission is to increase access and opportunities for underserved youth through a focus on baseball instruction, academics support and life skills development.

== Personal life ==
Salvino lives in Charlotte, North Carolina. He and his wife Denise, who serves on the Duke Catholic Center Advisory Board, was a cheerleader for the Chicago Bulls and a three-year captain, and is a cancer survivor, have three children.

- Matthew Salvino, MD — a Urology resident at Duke University. Graduated from Duke, with a Biomedical Engineering degree and Duke Medical School.
- Mitchell Salvino, MBA — a Management Consultant at Accenture. Graduated from Washington and Lee University, with an Integrated Engineering degree and Wake Forest, with an MBA. He played baseball at both universities, successfully making the jump from playing DIII baseball to playing DI baseball in the ACC.
- Morgan Salvino — a senior at Wake Forest University and a cheerleader for the Demon Deacons.
