= Peraton Labs =

American research and engineering company

- Type: Subsidiary
- Founded: January 12, 2012
- Headquarters: Basking Ridge, New Jersey, U.S.
- Key people: Petros Mouchtaris, President; Tony Bogovic, VP, Corporate Development
- Parent: Peraton (May 2021 – current); Perspecta Inc. (2018 – May 2021); Vencore, Inc. (2013–2018); Telcordia Technologies/Ericsson (2004–2013); SAIC (1997–2004); Baby Bells (1984–1997)
- Website: www.peratonlabs.com

Peraton Labs is an applied research organization for communications and information technologies headquartered in Basking Ridge, New Jersey (U.S.), with laboratory facilities in Basking Ridge, Red Bank, NJ, and Silver Spring, MD.

Peraton Labs is wholly owned subsidiary of Peraton, acquired by Peraton's owner private-equity firm Veritas Capital as part of a 2021 merger of Peraton with Perspecta Inc. At that time, Perspecta Labs president and general manager Petros Mouchtaris became the head of Peraton Labs, which has over 400 researchers, engineers, and analysts.

Earlier business names associated with the organization have included Vencore Labs, Applied Communication Sciences, and Telcordia Advanced Technology Solutions.

== History ==
As part of the 1984 breakup of AT&T, roughly 7,500 of Bell Labs 25,000 employees were allocated to the regional Bell companies and organized as Bell Communications Research, also known as Bellcore. SAIC bought Bellcore from the regional Bell companies in 1997, renamed it Telcordia Technologies in 1999, and sold it to investors in 2005. In 2012, Ericsson bought Telcordia and spun out the Telcordia Advanced Technology Solutions as a wholly owned subsidiary under the name Applied Communication Sciences (ACS).

In 2014, Ericsson sold ACS to The SI Organization, which renamed itself Vencore in 2014 and changed the name of ACS to Vencore Labs. After parent company Vencore merged to form Perspecta Inc in 2018, Vencore Labs became Perspecta Labs, and it became Peraton Labs after the merger with Peraton in 2021.

== Business focus ==
Peraton Labs (formerly Applied Communication Sciences) addresses large-scale information and communications problems requiring deep knowledge of technology and operations. Particular areas of focus include cyber security, data analytics, wireless and mobility applications, advanced software methodologies, network and operations, information assurance, optical networking, application engineering and integration, and smart grid.

Including work as part of Telcordia, Peraton Labs (ACS) researchers have produced more than 2,000 patents across ADSL, ATM/SONET, Advanced Intelligent Network (AIN), optical networking / Wavelength-division multiplexing (WDM), wireless (3G/4G, cellular, mobility), security and other areas of communications and information.

Peraton Labs (ACS) is active in the development of a wide range of industry standards, with standards-bodies memberships including IEEE, ATIS, TIA, 3GPP, ETSI, OIF, Open Mobile Alliance, Open Geospatial Consortium, Small Cells Forum, ZigBee Alliance and related industry organizations.

== Recent projects ==
In 2024, Intelligence Advanced Research Projects Activity (IARPA) of the Office of Director of National Intelligence selected Peraton Labs as one of five research teams aiming to find ways to boost cybersecurity by predicting hacker behavior in order to identify hacker decision-making biases and then develop ways to measure ways to change hacker's behavior.
