= Peraton =

American national security and tech company

Peraton Inc.
- Type: Private
- Industry: cybersecurity
- Founded: 2017
- Founder: Stu Shea
- Headquarters: Reston, Virginia, U.S.
- Key people: Steve Schorer, chairman, president, CEO
- Revenue: US$7 billion (2023)
- Number of employees: > 18,000 (2024)
- Parent: Veritas Capital
- Website: www.peraton.com

Peraton Inc. is an American national security and technology company owned since its formation in 2017 by private-equity firm Veritas Capital. It is headquartered in Reston, Virginia. Its service areas include space, intelligence, cyber, defense, homeland security, citizen security, and health. The company's applied research organization, Peraton Labs, is located in Basking Ridge, New Jersey.

As of 2021, the company had more than 150 offices across the United States. Peraton then employed over 5,000 people in the D.C. area and approximately 18,000 worldwide.

== History ==
Peraton was established and has grown due to acquisitions made by New York-based private-equity firm Veritas Capital. In 2017, Veritas acquired Harris Corporation's government IT services division for $690 million and renamed it Peraton. In 2019, Peraton acquired Solers, Inc.; the terms of the acquisition were not disclosed. In 2021, Veritas acquired the federal IT and mission support business of Northrop Grumman for $3.4 billion. In May 2021, Perspecta (a 2018 merger of DXC Technology's U.S. public sector spin-off, Vencore, Inc., and KeyPoint Government Solutions), was acquired by Veritas for $7.1 billion and placed under Peraton.

Peraton was awarded a $2.69 billion contract by the U.S. Department of Homeland Security concerning Data Center and Cloud Optimization Support Services. Peraton also captured a $1B contract from the Pentagon to counter "misinformation".

Despite loss of business due to the reorganization of the U.S. government in President Trump's second term, Peraton is still maintaining existing and receiving new government contracts. In December 2025, despite concerns about triple-C credit ratings from Fitch and Moody's, Peraton beat out an offer from Parsons Corp and IBM to win a $1.5 billion contract to serve as prime integrator overseeing an allocated $12.5 billion (and an additional $20 billion requested) for modernization of the FAA's Air Traffic Control System. As of September 2026, Peraton's master schedule for the modernization effort listed 330,000 independent projects.
