= PRSP =

PRSP may refer to:

- Poverty Reduction Strategy Paper, documents required by the International Monetary Fund and World Bank
- Penicillin-resistant Streptococcus pneumoniae, a Streptococcus species resistant to antibiotics
- Perspecta (defense contractor), publicly traded IT Service Management Company
