= Robert Schriesheim =

American business executive

Robert A. Schriesheim
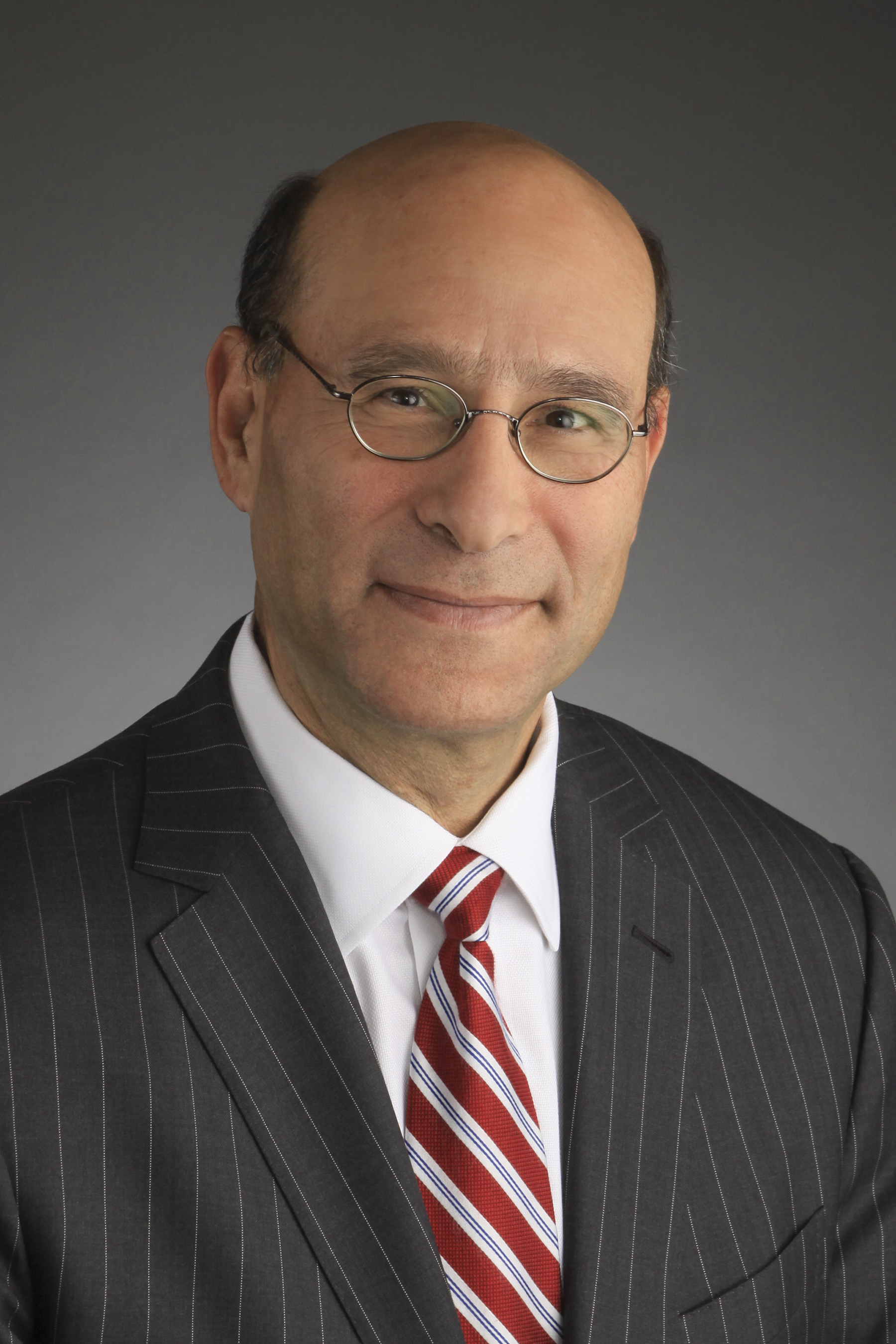
- Born: 1960 or 1961 (age 65–66); New Jersey, United States
- Citizenship: American
- Education: Princeton University (BS), University of Chicago Booth School of Business (MBA)
- Occupation: Business executive
- Parent(s): Beatrice and Alan Schriesheim

Robert A. Schriesheim (born 1960/61) is an American business executive who has been on the board of directors of 11 public companies, including as board chairman. He is chairman of Truax Partners LLC and has partnered with institutional investors leading large enterprises through complex corporate restructuring.

According to a 2016 Wall Street Journal article, he has a "history of working in partnership with private equity firms, hedge funds and institutional investors in special situation circumstances".

According to Barron's and CFO magazine, Schriesheim has "spent most of his career at the high end of the strategy spectrum, embroiled in complex restructurings" focused on capital allocation. He is also an adjunct professor at The University of Chicago Booth School of Business where he teaches a course titled "Corporate Governance and Activism: The Role of Boards in Critical Decisions".

== Early life, family and education ==
Schriesheim was raised in Summit, New Jersey, a suburb of New York City, by parents Beatrice and Dr. Alan Schriesheim who were scientists and educators and he has an older sister.

His father was the director emeritus and retired CEO of Argonne National Laboratory, and a chemist. In 2008 The Schriesheim Distinguished Graduate Fellowship was established at the Eberly College of Science at Penn State University.

His mother Beatrice Schriesheim was a long-time high school chemistry teacher committed to improving science education in the United States. She was born in 1930 in Poland and survived the Holocaust by escaping the Nazi invasion in 1939, surviving imprisonment in Siberia and arriving in the US in 1947. Her memoirs, "Bea's Journey", documented her experiences of the Holocaust and life in the United States. They were independently published in 2003 after her death at the age of 73.

Robert Schriesheim attended the Pingry School, a college preparatory school in New Jersey, graduating in 1978, graduated from Princeton University with a degree in chemistry and from the University of Chicago Booth School of Business with an MBA. While at Princeton he was a member of the Princeton Men's Varsity Swim team.

== Career ==
Schriesheim was on various boards of publicly traded companies including Houlihan Lokey, Skyworks Solutions, a provider of semiconductors to mobile telephone manufactures and Alight Solutions, an employee administration services provider. Schriesheim ws chairman of the finance committee of the board and was credited with leading the corporate restructuring of Frontier Communications and was recognized with the 2021 M&A Advisor’s Annual Turnaround Award for Telecommunications Services Deal of the Year.

Until 2016, Schriesheim was executive vice president and chief financial officer of troubled Sears Holdings Corporation which was controlled by chairman and CEO Edward S. Lampert. During Schriesheim time, Sears managed its balance sheet and restructured its asset portfolio with divestments of Lands' End, Sears Canada, Sears Hometown and Outlet Stores, Orchard Supply Hardware and the separation of Seritage Growth Properties, a public REIT. Schriesheim was selected by Eddie Lampert as CFO in 2011 and raised $9 billion of capital through various borrowing and sales — departing Sears in October 2016. Two years after Schriesheim's departure in 2016, Sears Holdings filed for Chapter 11 Bankcruptcy in October 2018.

Prior to joining Sears Holdings, Schriesheim was senior vice president and chief financial officer for Hewitt Associates until its sale to Aon. Prior to Hewitt, Schriesheim was a board member, executive vice president and chief financial officer of Lawson Software.

=== Corporate roles ===
Schriesheim led the corporate restructuring of Frontier Communications as the full time finance committee chairman overseeing the replacement of the board of directors, the hiring of a new CEO, and initiated a new company strategy to deal with high levels of debt. In an interview he claimed this resulted in the reduction of $10 billion in debt from the $17.5 billion at the start of the restructuring while generating $5 billion in market value for the benefit of the bond holders.

He was named as executive vice president and chief financial officer of Sears Holdings in August 2011. Before Sears, he was CFO of Hewitt Associates. Prior to Hewitt, from 2006 to 2011, he held various roles at Lawson Software, including executive vice president, chief financial officer and a board director. Schriesheim was credited with a turnaround in financial performance.

He was named a board director of MSC Software in December 2007 and was later named co-chairman. In addition Schriesheim has been a board member of Skyworks Solutions a producer of analog and mixed signal semiconductors since 2006.

Earlier in his career he worked at the Brooke Group, a leveraged buyout firm controlled by Bennett S. LeBow who acquired control of Western Union. LeBow installed Schriesheim at Western Union from 1987 to 1990 as a special adviser to CEO Robert J. Amman to help oversee a restructuring of the company. They executed a strategy of redirecting Western Union from being an asset-based provider of communications services into a provider of consumer-based money transfer financial services and divested the company's telecommunications assets.
