= Vencore =

Private defense contractor

Vencore, Inc.
- Formerly: The SI Organization, Inc.
- Type: Private
- Founded: 1972
- Headquarters: Chantilly, VA, United States
- Revenue: 1,130,000,000 United States dollar (2017)
- Number of employees: 4800
- Subsidiaries: Applied Communication Sciences
- Website: vencore.com

Vencore, Inc. was a private defense contractor that served the U.S. Intelligence Community, Department of Defense and other agencies. From 2010 to 2014, the company was named The SI Organization, Inc. (the SI). The SI provided full life cycle, mission-focused systems engineering and integration capabilities, according to its corporate website. Major locations include Chantilly (VA), Basking Ridge (NJ), Denver (CO), Laurel (MD), Los Angeles (CA), Red Bank (NJ), St. Louis (MO), and Valley Forge (PA). The company employed approximately 2,000 people. It is now part of Peraton.

== History ==
The SI was founded in 1972 in Valley Forge, Pennsylvania, as part of GE Aerospace, when a team of 60 engineers began providing systems engineering and integration services to the Intelligence Community. The System Integrator construct was conceived by the US Government to help implement a very large, complex, and expensive space-based national security program. Due to the success of the construct, the SI grew throughout the 1980s and 1990s, as part of Martin Marietta and later Lockheed Martin, expanding into Northern Virginia and Maryland. The SI was divested by Lockheed Martin in 2010 and acquired by private equity firm Veritas Capital.

In 2012, the SI acquired PhaseOne Communications, a company that provides strategic communications services. In 2013, the SI acquired Applied Communication Sciences. ACS has capabilities in cybersecurity and information assurance, network and operations, data analytics, advanced software and methodologies, wireless and mobility, application engineering and integration, smart grid, and optical networking and quantum technologies.

In October 2013, the SI was notified by the US Air Force Space & Missile Systems Center (SMC) that it had submitted the winning proposal for SMC's follow-on GPS SE&I contract, supplanting incumbent Leidos (formerly SAIC) on the program it had managed since 2007.

In 2014 the SI acquired QinetiQ North America, and soon thereafter, changed its name to Vencore.

In October 2017 it was announced that Vencore would merge with the U.S. Public Sector business of DXC Technology and with KeyPoint Government Solutions to create a new independent and publicly traded government contractor. The newly formed company was named Perspecta Inc. The merger completed and Perspecta began operations on June 1, 2018. On August 1, 2019, Perspecta acquired Knight Point Systems.
