= Luxoft =

Swiss technology company

- Type: Subsidiary
- Industry: Software development
- Founded: 2000; 26 years ago in Moscow, Russia
- Headquarters: Zug, Switzerland
- Area served: Worldwide
- Key people: Raul Fernandez (President and CEO)
- Services: application development; Mobile application development; software engineering; IT consulting and User experience design
- Revenue: ▲US$906.8 million (2018)
- Number of employees: 17,000+
- Parent: DXC Technology (100%)
- Website: www.luxoft.com

Luxoft, a DXC Technology subsidiary, is represented in 21 countries with 17 000+ employees globally. Luxoft is headquartered in Zug, Switzerland, with several large offices in the US, Poland, Germany, Bulgaria, India, Ukraine, Singapore, and Serbia.

== History ==
In 2000, Luxoft was established under the direction of Dmitry Loschinin in Russia.

In 2008, it acquired ITC Networks in Bucharest.

In 2013, Luxoft was listed on the New York Stock Exchange, following an initial public offering of 4.1 million shares at $17.00 per ordinary share. UBS Limited, Credit Suisse Securities (USA) LLC, J.P. Morgan Securities LLC, VTB Capital plc and Cowen and Company, LLC were the joint book-running managers for the offering.

In 2010, Luxoft established a development center in Kraków, Poland. Since 2018, Luxoft has been present in Italy (Turin), through the acquisition of the Objective site.

In 2018, Luxoft enabled Switzerland's first Blockchain based e-vote platform with the City of Zug and Hochschule Luzern's Blockchain Lab.

In January 2019, DXC Technology of Tysons Corner, Virginia announced the acquisition of Luxoft Holding.

In June 2019, DXC Technology completed the 100% acquisition of Luxoft. According to the information from SEC database, DXC Technology owns 83% of Luxoft shares.

== Controversy ==
Because of Russian invasion of Ukraine, the company announced it strongly supported Ukraine and condemned Russia. It decided to leave the Russian market, accordingly in April 2022 and the Russian business was sold to IBS Holding.

== Acquisitions ==
Company name	Industry	Country	Date of acquisition	Reference
Radius Inc.	Internet of Things/Big data	USA	2014	
Excelian	Financial services	UK	2015	
Symtavision GmbH	Automotive - Timing Analysis	Germany	2016	
Pelagicore AB	Automotive	Sweden	2016	
INSYS Group	Healthcare/Telco	USA	2016	
IntroPro	TMT	Ukraine	2017	
derivIT	Financial services	Singapore	2017	
UNAFORTIS AG	Financial services	Switzerland	2017	
Smashing Ideas	Design & Innovation	USA	2018	
Objective Software GmbH	Automotive Software Development	Germany	2018	
CMORE Automotive GmbH	Automotive	Germany	2020	
