= Stu Shea =

American business executive (born 1957)

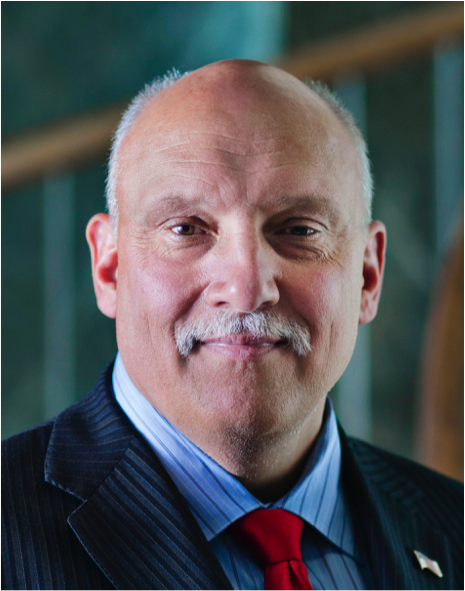
- Shea in June 2015
- Born: January 9, 1957 (age 69); Hollis, New York, U.S.
- Education: State University of New York, Albany (BS) University of Kansas (MA)
- Known for: Separation of Science Applications International Corporation (NYSE: SAI) into two publicly traded companies: Leidos (NYSE: LDOS) and SAIC (NYSE: SAIC); Founder of USGIF and the GEOINT Symposium; Former chairman, president, and CEO of Peraton

Stu Shea is an American business executive in the national security and intelligence sector. He is best known for being chairman and chief executive officer of Peraton, and for his previous leadership roles at Leidos and Science Applications International Corporation (SAIC). Shea is also the founder of the United States Geospatial Intelligence Foundation (USGIF).

== Early life and education ==
Shea was born in Queens, New York, and attended Mineola High School. He earned a Bachelor of Science degree in geological sciences from the University at Albany, SUNY in 1979 and a Master of Arts in geography from the University of Kansas in 1983.

In 2022, he was awarded an honorary doctorate of humane letters from George Mason University.

== Career ==
Shea began his career in 1982 as a software engineer at Rome Research Corporation, working on computer mapping applications for U.S. intelligence and defense agencies. He later held technical and management roles at PAR Government Systems Corporation and The Analytic Sciences Corporation (TASC), which underwent a series of corporate acquisitions through the 1990s and early 2000s. After Northrop Grumman acquired TASC's parent company Litton Industries in 2001, Shea became vice president and general manager of its Space and Intelligence Business Unit.

In 2005, Shea joined Science Applications International Corporation (SAIC), where he led the Intelligence, Surveillance, and Reconnaissance Group. He was appointed chief operating officer in 2012, and led the separation of SAIC into two public companies, Leidos and a restructured SAIC. Shea became president and COO of Leidos following the separation and remained until 2014.

In 2017 was named chief executive officer of Peraton, where Shea was chairman and CEO from 2017 to 2024.

== Honors and awards ==
Shea was named a Fellow of the American Congress on Surveying and Mapping in 1997. In 2009, he received the Federal 100 (Fed100) Award from Federal Computer Week. He was awarded the Intelligence Community Seal Medallion in 2016 by the Director of National Intelligence. In 2018, Shea was inducted into the National Geospatial-Intelligence Agency’s GEOINT Hall of Fame. He has also been a multiple-time recipient of the Executive Mosaic Wash100 Award.
