= Mineola, New York =

Village in New York, United States

Mineola Miniolagamika
- Village; County seat of Nassau County
- Incorporated Village of Mineola
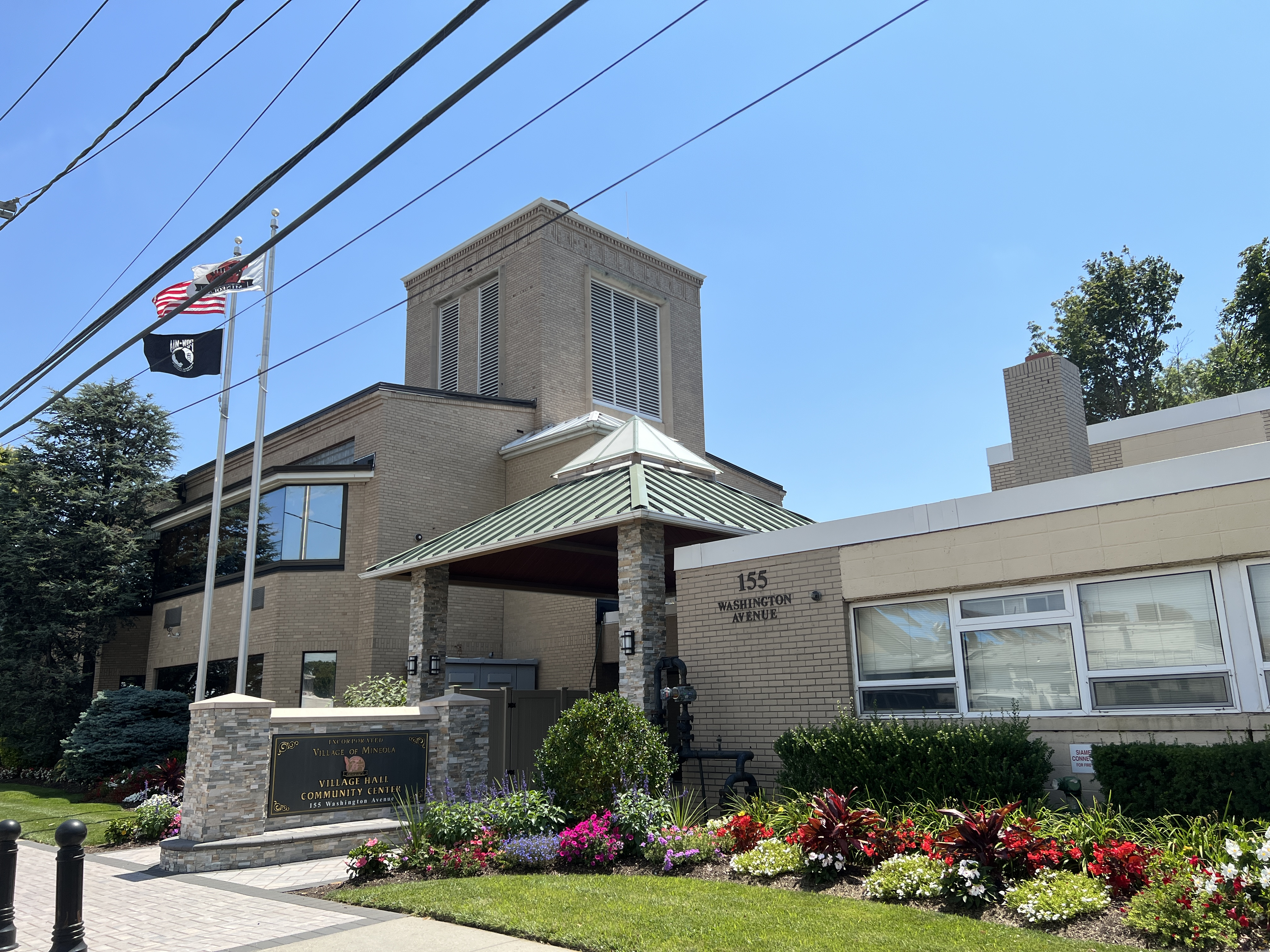
- Mineola Village Hall and Community Center

- Location in Nassau County and the state of New York

- Location on Long Island Location in the state of New York
- Coordinates: 40°44′50″N 73°38′17″W
- Country: United States
- State: New York
- County: Nassau County
- Town: North Hempstead; Hempstead
- Incorporated: 1906
- Named for: Algonquin Chief Miniolagamika

Government
  - Mayor: Paul A. Pereira
  - Deputy Mayor: Janine Sartori

Area
  - Total: 1.85 sq mi (4.79 km^{2})
  - Land: 1.85 sq mi (4.79 km^{2})
  - Water: 0 sq mi (0.00 km^{2})
- Elevation: 108 ft (33 m)

Population (2020)
  - Total: 20,800
  - Density: 11,236.4/sq mi (4,338.39/km^{2})
- Time zone: UTC−5 (Eastern (EST))
  - Summer (DST): UTC−4 (EDT)
- ZIP Code: 11501
- Area codes: 516, 363
- FIPS code: 36-47636
- GNIS feature ID: 0957391
- Website: www.mineola-ny.gov

Mineola (/mɪniˈoʊlə/, min-ee-OH-lə) is a village and the county seat of Nassau County, on Long Island, New York, United States. The population was 20,800 at the time of the 2020 census. It is considered the anchor community of the Greater Mineola area.

The Incorporated Village of Mineola is located primarily in the Town of North Hempstead, with the exception being a small portion of its southern edge within the Town of Hempstead. Old Country Road (CR 25) runs along the village's southern border.

The area serviced by the Mineola Post Office extends farther south into the adjacent village of Garden City, where the Old Nassau County Courthouse and other county offices are located. Offices of many Nassau County agencies are in both Mineola and Garden City.

== History ==
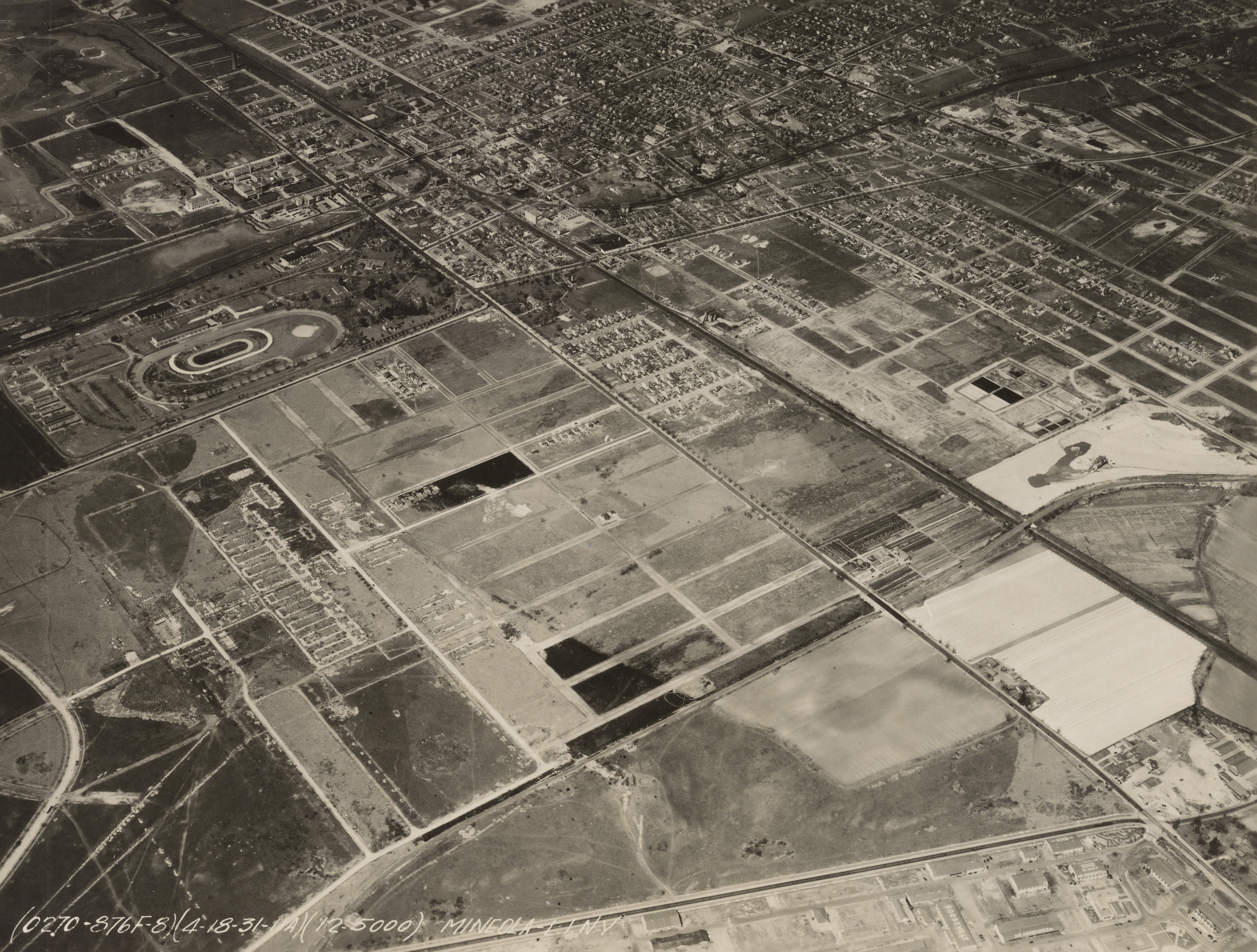
Mineola in 1931

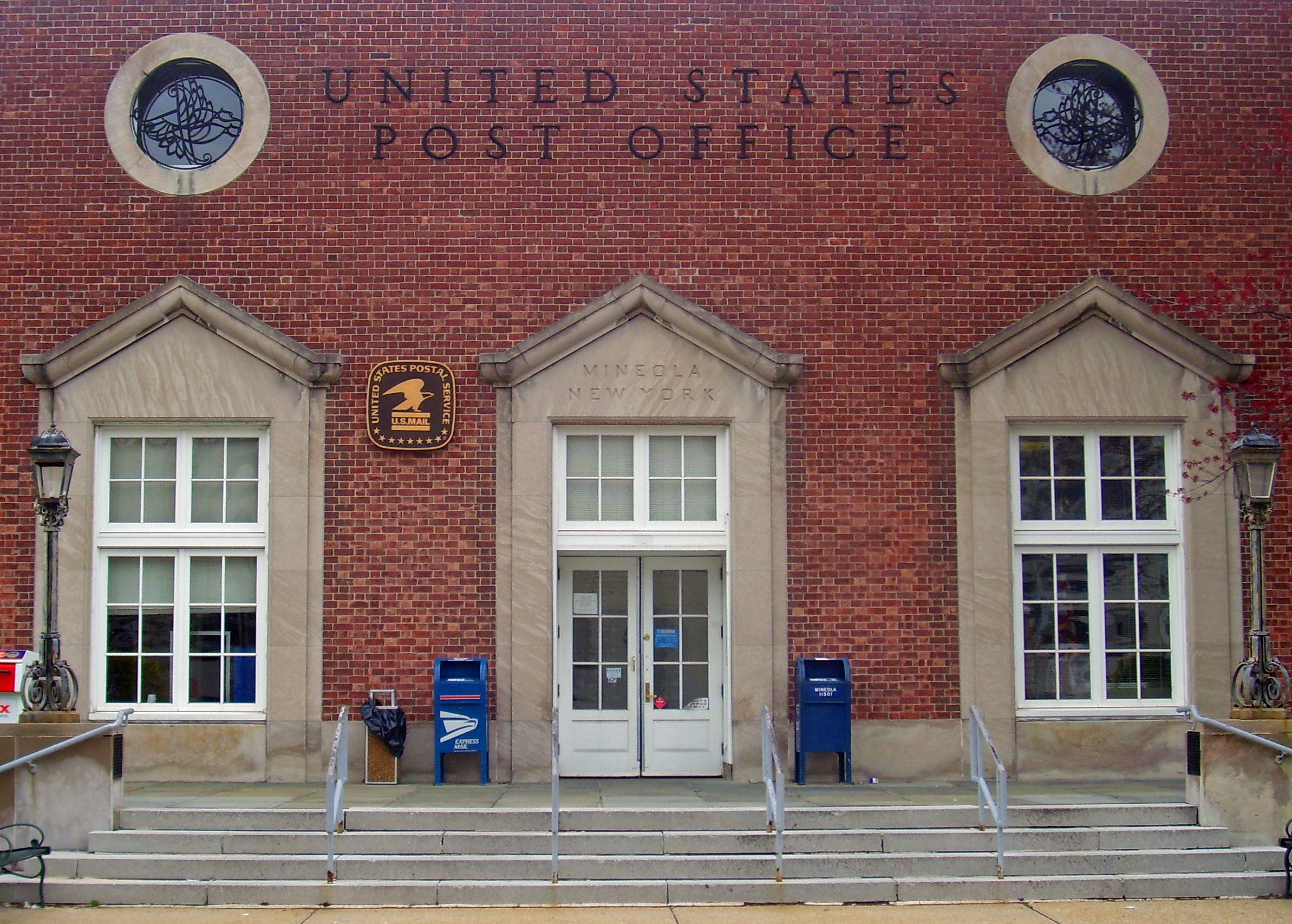
The Mineola Post Office – a landmark listed on the National Register of Historic Places – as seen in 2008

=== Pre-incorporation ===
The central, flat, grassy part of Long Island was originally known as the Hempstead Plains. In the 19th century, various communities were started in this area. One of those communities was called "Hempstead Branch," which would ultimately be known as "Mineola" later on.

As early as 1609, Long Island was part of Henry Hudson's original claim in the name of the Dutch East India Company. In the 18th century, the Dutch and English settlers worked to clear farmland to start their life on the Hempstead Plains. It was in 1858 when the community was named by the locals after an Algonquin Indian Chief, Miniolagamika meaning, "Pleasant Village". The name was later shortened and altered to "Mineola".

From about 1787 until the 1870s, the area was the county seat for Queens County, in a section then known as Clowesville – located just outside the Village of Mineola's present territory. That area today is largely in the adjacent hamlet, Garden City Park. The western portion of Queens became a borough of New York City in 1898, and in 1899, Nassau County was formed from the part of Queens that did not consolidate. Voters selected Mineola (in the Town of North Hempstead) to be the county seat for the new county of Nassau in November 1898(before Mineola incorporated as a village in 1906 and set its boundaries), winning out over Hicksville and Hempstead. The Garden City Company (founded in 1893 by the heirs of Alexander Turney Stewart) donated four acres of land for the county buildings just south of the Mineola LIRR station and the present day Village of Mineola, in the Town of Hempstead; these buildings today are physically located within the territory constituting the Village of Garden City but use the Mineola ZIP Code.

Mineola officially became the County Seat of Nassau County on July 13, 1900, as Governor Theodore Roosevelt laid the cornerstone of the Nassau County Court House. A celebration was held to commemorate the occasion on the barren 5-acre (20,000 m^{2}) site at the corner of Old Country Road and Franklin Avenue. Many dignitaries were present to witness this event such as Frederick Hicks, Congressman Townsend Scudder, Colonel William Youngs and Supervisors William Jones and Edwin Willits.

=== Village of Mineola, 1906–present ===
Mineola was legally incorporated as a village in 1906 and run by a president. The lands on which the County buildings sat were not included as part of the village. The land and the buildings have a Mineola postal address, but are within the present day Village of Garden City, which did not incorporate or set its boundaries until 1919.

NYU Langone Hospital – Long Island founded in 1896 by local physicians and residents as Nassau Hospital – was Long Island's first voluntary hospital. In 1897, it admitted 91 patients, performed 27 operations, and reported two births and eight deaths during the first year. The original hospital was constructed in 1900. Renamed Winthrop-University Hospital in the 1980s, it is now a nationally recognized award-winning hospital and in 2004 was ranked among the Top 5 Percent of Acute-Care Hospitals in the Country.

In 1888, the Mineola Fire Department was formed in the Willis Avenue School house. The department soon moved to a new location on Washington Avenue. The department originally consisted of volunteer firemen and would officially be incorporated as an official company in 1889.

In 1839, the Long Island Rail Road reached Mineola, with the community's eponymous station along what is now the Main Line opening that same year.

In 1840, the Mineola Hotel was built by resident John A. Searing across from the LIRR station, which had been completed the year prior. When the village was separated from Queens and became the county seat of Nassau, it was renamed to Allen's Mineola Hotel. It is considered a landmark alongside the local offices and agencies in Garden City. An adjacent inn, also named the Mineola Hotel, burned down in 1966 as the result of arson. One man was killed and seven others were injured. A jobless machinist, a 20 year old hotel resident named Chlary Skorge, Jr. who was previously on probation for robbery, was indicted for murder. The cause was speculated to be revenge, as he was threatened with eviction after annoying fellow residents.

Main Street was the center of village business as well as a popular meeting place for farmers and the business community alike. The general store offered an array of goods that would fulfill most everyday needs, such as hardware, toys, wool, dry goods, clothing and food. The small glass-fronted mail and delivery boxes filled the existing six-foot post office. As the Mineola population grew, the post office was relocated to the Meyer Building on Mineola Boulevard, and then twice more to 3rd Street and 2nd Street. It eventually found its permanent home on 1st Street and Main Street. As years passed, Jericho Turnpike became the commercial "main street" within Mineola. Farmland was sold off and homes and offices were built. Mineola would continue to be a community of growth and development – a trend continuing into the 21st century.

Mineola's first theater named Allen's Hall drew in many early moviegoers to see "the flickers". Motion picture success drew in other theaters to the area, the most lavish being the Century Opera House. Most theaters had a showing in the morning and in the evening, usually featuring a live pianist who kept up with the action of the movie while playing music that suited the story.

The centennial celebration for Mineola was held in 2006. Developments for this celebration originated in 2004 from a Centennial Committee formed by then-mayor Jack M. Martins. Co-chairing this were John DaVanzo, former mayor Robert W. Hinck, Sr., and Candida Maia. Various events commenced in January 2006, including the Nassau Pops Symphony Orchestra performing at Chaminade High School, the installation of LIRR Caboose #50 in Memorial Park, the unveiling of a historical quilt by the Nimble Fingers quilting group, and a Centennial Journal delivered to residents and businesses. In March, a fashion show entitled “Decade by Decade” was hosted by Fox’s department store at the Corpus Christi Knights of Columbus Hall, and a marching parade consisting of 80 units took place later in October. The final event was an ecumenical service at Mineola Middle School in December, followed by fireworks in Mineola Memorial Park.

In 2005–2006, as a result of numerous recommendations from the community that Mineola increase its police force, a Mineola Police Task Force was appointed by then-Mayor Jack M. Martins to evaluate the feasibility of withdrawing from the Nassau County Police Department and establishing a village police department. The Mayor indicated to the Task Force at its inception that if the feasibility study resulted in a positive report, Mineola would only have its own police department if the residents approved such through a village-wide referendum. The village board was split 3–2 in favor of the police force, with Mayor Martins, Deputy Mayor Werther, and Trustee Davanzo supporting it – while Trustees Fargrieve and Cusato opposed it. On December 5, 2006, the measure was defeated by a 2–1 margin by village residents in a referendum.

In the 2010s and 2020s, the Village of Mineola's downtown has seen significant growth, in part credited to the creation of large-scale transit-oriented development in the vicinity of the Mineola LIRR station.

=== Prevalence in aviation ===
Mineola was also a familiar place to many of the most famous pilots in history. The Aero Club of America chose the area for the level plains. Glenn Curtiss brought the area to national attention in July 1909 with his second Scientific American Award flight of over 23 minutes and 15 miles. He also made some of the first public flights in America in his "Golden Flyer", while practicing for the Reims Aviation Meet in France. The Wright Brothers, Igor Sikorsky, Captain Rene Fonck, and the famed duo of Clarence Chamberlain and Bert Acosta, dubbed "twins of derring-do", all spent time in Mineola taking advantage of the rolling grasslands and favorable winds.

On November 1, 1915, Captain Raynal Cawthorne Bolling, a New York attorney working at United States Steel, organized the Aviation Detachment, 1st Battalion Signal Corps of the New York National Guard (now the 102nd Rescue Squadron). It was the Guard's first genuine aviation unit. Subsequently, the organization was re-designated as the 1st Aero Company. Located at Mineola on Long Island, the unit rented and then purchased its own aircraft with funds donated by the Aero Club of America and other contributors. It was "provisionally recognized" on June 22, 1916, and then called into federal service on July 13, 1916, during the Mexican border crisis. However, instead of active service in the southwest, it remained at Mineola for training and was ultimately released from federal service on November 2, 1916.

After World War I, the British Royal Navy rigid airship R34 made the first-ever east–west aerial crossing of the North Atlantic, traveling from the airship base at RAF East Fortune in the UK to Mineola from July 2 to 6, 1919.

On May 20, 1927, at 7:52 a.m., Charles Lindbergh started his historic flight on the Spirit of St. Louis from nearby Roosevelt Field. Thirty-three hours later he landed in Paris and became the first person to complete a solo flight from the United States across the Atlantic Ocean. This historic feat was given numerous test flights in the weeks leading up to his departure, particularly in San Diego and St. Louis. On May 20, 1977, fifty years after the flight, a thirteen-cent commemorative stamp depicting the Spirit of St. Louis over the Atlantic Ocean was issued in commemoration.

=== 1982 Long Island Rail Road auto-train collision ===
At approximately 2:18 A.M. on Sunday, March 14, 1982, ten teenagers were riding in a Ford Econoline van on their way to a nearby popular nightspot in Garden City South after attending a friend's house party when the driver swerved around the closed Herricks Road railroad crossing gates, only for their vehicle to be struck broadside and dragged an estimated 100 yards. A 17-year-old girl, Kathleen Caemmerer (the daughter of former New York State Senator John D. Caemmerer) was the only survivor despite being severely injured. The county's worst vehicular accident and railroad accident in its history sent shockwaves across New York and across the country. In an investigation made and concluded by the Nassau County Police Department, the primary cause of the accident was the driver's failure of judgement contributed by driving under the influence.

=== Etymology ===
The village's name is derived from an Algonquin Chief, Miniolagamika, which means "pleasant village."

== Geography ==
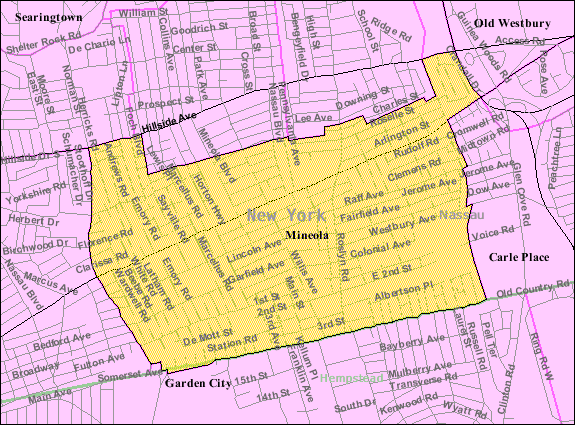
U.S. Census map of Mineola

According to the United States Census Bureau, the village has an area of 1.9 square miles (4.9 km^{2}), all land. The village gained territory between the 1990 census and the 2000 census.

Mineola is located approximately 21 miles (34 km) east of Midtown Manhattan and 4 miles (6 km) from the Queens border. The villages bordering Mineola are East Williston and Williston Park to the north, and Garden City to the south. Mineola also borders the hamlets (CDP) of Carle Place to the east, Garden City Park and Herricks to the west, and Roslyn Heights to the north.

Near the center of the village, Mineola Memorial Park commemorates the victims of the September 11 terrorist attacks with a monument. Mineola's own Memorial Library, as well as multiple private & public schools, adjoin the park. The Memorial Tablet and surrounding paths were an Eagle Project by Troop 45 Eagle Scout Edward Kaiser.

=== Climate ===
According to the Köppen climate classification, Mineola has a Humid subtropical climate (type Cfa) with cool, wet winters and hot, humid summers. Precipitation is uniform throughout the year, with slight spring and fall peaks.

Climate data for Mineola, New York, 1991–2020 normals, extremes 1999–present
| Month | Jan | Feb | Mar | Apr | May | Jun | Jul | Aug | Sep | Oct | Nov | Dec | Year |
|---|---|---|---|---|---|---|---|---|---|---|---|---|---|
| Record high °F (°C) | 71 (22) | 73 (23) | 85 (29) | 94 (34) | 97 (36) | 103 (39) | 105 (41) | 104 (40) | 100 (38) | 90 (32) | 83 (28) | 76 (24) | 105 (41) |
| Mean daily maximum °F (°C) | 39 (4) | 43 (6) | 50 (10) | 61 (16) | 70 (21) | 80 (27) | 85 (29) | 83 (28) | 76 (24) | 65 (18) | 55 (13) | 45 (7) | 63 (17) |
| Mean daily minimum °F (°C) | 26 (−3) | 28 (−2) | 34 (1) | 42 (6) | 51 (11) | 61 (16) | 66 (19) | 65 (18) | 58 (14) | 48 (9) | 40 (4) | 31 (−1) | 46 (8) |
| Record low °F (°C) | −10 (−23) | −7 (−22) | 3 (−16) | 13 (−11) | 32 (0) | 43 (6) | 50 (10) | 48 (9) | 38 (3) | 27 (−3) | 10 (−12) | −1 (−18) | −10 (−23) |
| Average precipitation inches (mm) | 3.62 (92) | 3.17 (81) | 4.35 (110) | 4.15 (105) | 3.90 (99) | 3.85 (98) | 4.40 (112) | 3.72 (94) | 3.91 (99) | 4.08 (104) | 3.73 (95) | 3.82 (97) | 46.7 (1,186) |
Source: The Weather Channel

==== Plant zone ====
According to the United States Department of Agriculture (USDA), Mineola is located within hardiness zone 7b.

=== Greater Mineola area ===
The Greater Mineola area consists of three incorporated villages and two unincorporated hamlets:

- Village of Mineola
- Carle Place
- Albertson
- Village of East Williston
- Village of Williston Park

== Economy ==
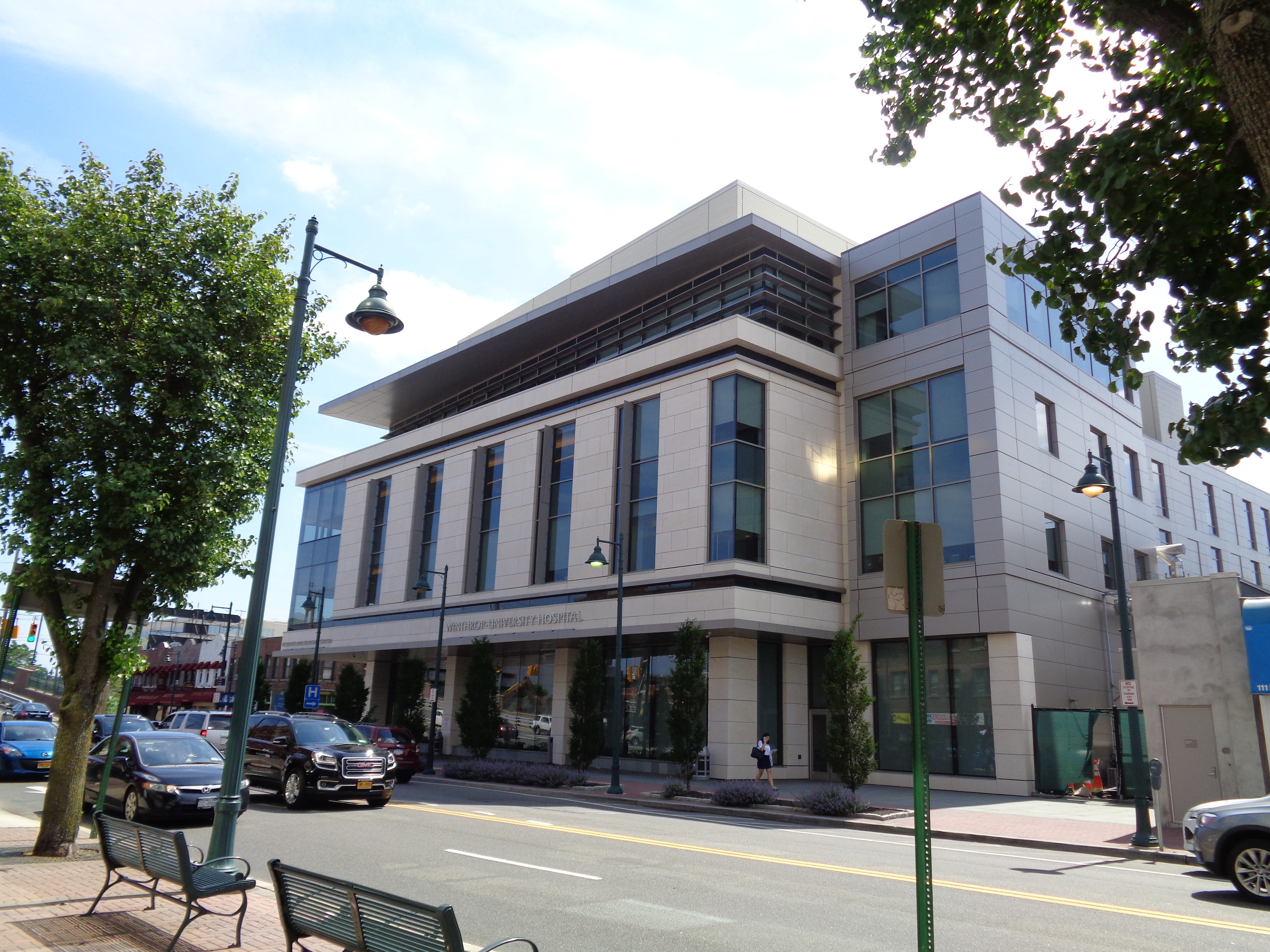
NYU Langone Hospital – Long Island in 2017

Mineola is considered a bedroom community of the City of New York. Accordingly, a large number of its residents commute to and from New York each day for work.

Dover Publications is based in Mineola. The village is also home to NYU Langone Hospital–Long Island (formerly known as Nassau Hospital, Winthrop University Hospital and NYU-Winthrop Hospital) – the second-largest employer located within the Town of North Hempstead.

== Demographics ==
Historical population
| Census | Pop. | Note | %± |
|---|---|---|---|
| 1880 | 313 | | — |
| 1910 | 1,981 | | — |
| 1920 | 3,016 | | 52.2% |
| 1930 | 8,155 | | 170.4% |
| 1940 | 10,064 | | 23.4% |
| 1950 | 14,831 | | 47.4% |
| 1960 | 20,519 | | 38.4% |
| 1970 | 21,845 | | 6.5% |
| 1980 | 20,757 | | −5.0% |
| 1990 | 18,994 | | −8.5% |
| 2000 | 19,234 | | 1.3% |
| 2010 | 18,799 | | −2.3% |
| 2020 | 20,800 | | 10.6% |
| 2024 (est.) | 21,305 | ▲ | 2.4% |
U.S. Decennial Census

=== Racial and ethnic composition ===
Mineola village, New York – Racial and ethnic composition Note: the US Census treats Hispanic/Latino as an ethnic category. This table excludes Latinos from the racial categories and assigns them to a separate category. Hispanics/Latinos may be of any race.
| Race / ethnicity (NH = Non-Hispanic) | Pop 2000 | Pop 2010 | Pop 2020 | % 2000 | % 2010 | % 2020 |
|---|---|---|---|---|---|---|
| White alone (NH) | 15,227 | 13,442 | 12,500 | 79.17% | 71.50% | 60.10% |
| Black or African American alone (NH) | 179 | 321 | 528 | 0.93% | 1.71% | 2.54% |
| Native American or Alaska Native alone (NH) | 22 | 13 | 13 | 0.11% | 0.07% | 0.06% |
| Asian alone (NH) | 862 | 1,579 | 2,860 | 4.48% | 8.40% | 13.75% |
| Native Hawaiian or Pacific Islander alone (NH) | 7 | 1 | 3 | 0.04% | 0.01% | 0.01% |
| Other race alone (NH) | 49 | 130 | 200 | 0.25% | 0.69% | 0.96% |
| Mixed race or Multiracial (NH) | 381 | 223 | 625 | 1.98% | 1.19% | 3.00% |
| Hispanic or Latino (any race) | 2,507 | 3,090 | 4,071 | 13.03% | 16.44% | 19.57% |
| Total | 19,234 | 18,799 | 20,800 | 100.00% | 100.00% | 100.00% |

=== 2020 census ===
As of the 2020 census, Mineola had a population of 20,800. The median age was 41.6 years. 17.6% of residents were under the age of 18 and 17.8% of residents were 65 years of age or older. For every 100 females there were 96.5 males, and for every 100 females age 18 and over there were 93.4 males age 18 and over.

100.0% of residents lived in urban areas, while 0.0% lived in rural areas.

There were 8,311 households in Mineola, of which 26.4% had children under the age of 18 living in them. Of all households, 47.6% were married-couple households, 18.1% were households with a male householder and no spouse or partner present, and 28.7% were households with a female householder and no spouse or partner present. About 31.0% of all households were made up of individuals and 11.8% had someone living alone who was 65 years of age or older.

There were 8,776 housing units, of which 5.3% were vacant. The homeowner vacancy rate was 0.7% and the rental vacancy rate was 4.2%.

Racial composition as of the 2020 census
| Race | Number | Percent |
|---|---|---|
| White | 13,126 | 63.1% |
| Black or African American | 562 | 2.7% |
| American Indian and Alaska Native | 46 | 0.2% |
| Asian | 2,880 | 13.8% |
| Native Hawaiian and Other Pacific Islander | 3 | 0.0% |
| Some other race | 1,965 | 9.4% |
| Two or more races | 2,218 | 10.7% |
| Hispanic or Latino (of any race) | 4,071 | 19.6% |

=== Demographic estimates ===
According to 2020 profile data, 28.4% of residents were foreign-born persons and 46.6% were female. The average age for men was 37.9 years and for women was 45.2 years. The average household size was 2.44 persons, with the average family household size being 3.09 persons.

=== Income and poverty ===
The median income for a household in the village was $138,385, and the per capita income was $65,423. Out of all households, 15% had a combined income of under $50,000, 23% were between $50,000–100,000, 36% were between $100,000–200,000, and 26% were over $200,000. Approximately 6.6% of the population lived below the poverty line, including 7% of children and 8% of seniors.

=== 2010 census ===
As of the census of 2010, there were 18,799 people, 7,473 households, and 4,954 families residing in the village. The population density was 10,337.3 people per square mile (3,991.3 people/km^{2}). There were 7,650 housing units at an average density of 4,111.5 per square mile (1,587.5/km^{2}). The racial makeup of the village was 81.7% White, 71.5% Non-Hispanic White, 2.0% African American, 0.2% Native American, 8.5% Asian, 5.3% from other races, and 2.3% from two or more races. 16.4% of the population is Hispanic or Latino of any race.

There were 7,473 households, out of which 27.0% had children under the age of 18 living with them, 53.2% were married couples living together, 9.3% had a female householder with no husband present, and 33.7% were non-families. 29.1% of all households were made up of individuals, and 11.8% had someone living alone who was 65 years of age or older. The average household size was 2.57 and the average family size was 3.20.

In the village, the population was spread out, with 20.2% under the age of 18, 7.4% from 18 to 24, 34.1% from 25 to 44, 22.6% from 45 to 64, and 15.7% who were 65 years of age or older. The median age was 38 years. For every 100 females, there were 92.5 males. For every 100 females age 18 and over, there were 89.6 males.

The median income for a household in the village was $60,706, and the median income for a family was $71,042. Males had a median income of $47,182 versus $37,057 for females. The per capita income for the village was $28,890. About 2.6% of families and 4.2% of the population were below the poverty line, including 3.5% of those under age 18 and 5.4% of those age 65 or over.

=== Portuguese community ===
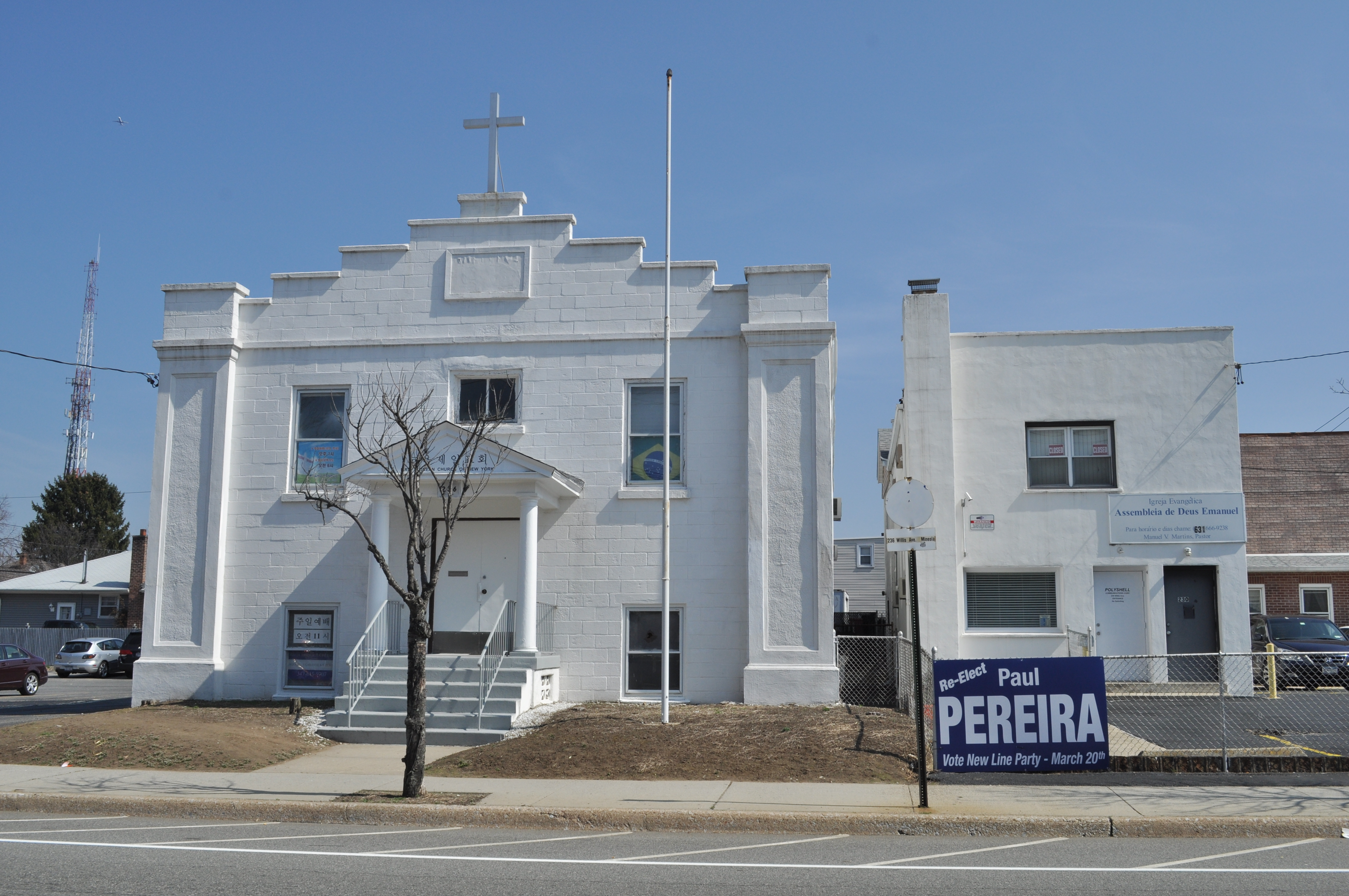
Korean and Portuguese churches in Mineola

Mineola has been home to a large, well-established Portuguese community since the early 20th century. Portuguese restaurants and businesses – in addition to the Portuguese language – are a common feature throughout the village. According to census data, the village contains approximately 1,900 Portuguese residents, out of the 5,100 total across Long Island.

== Government ==
=== Village government ===
The legislative body of the village is the Village of Mineola Board of Trustees, which is composed of a mayor and four village trustees – one of whom also serves as the deputy mayor, appointed to that rule annually by the mayor. Each member is elected to a four-year term. The board is charged with management of village property and finances, and may take all measures under the law for the good government of the village. The trustees may adopt a wide range of local laws to address village concerns.

The trustees are appointed to be liaison officers to various community organizations throughout the village and report back to the board with updates at board meetings.

As of August 2025, the Mayor of Mineola is Paul A. Pereira, the Deputy Mayor is Janine Sartori, and the Village Trustees are Jeffrey M. Clark, Paul S. Cuasto, Janine Sartori, and Donna M. Solosky.

=== Representation in higher government ===
==== Town representation ====
Mineola is located in the Town of North Hempstead's 2nd and 3rd council districts, which as of August 2025 are represented on the North Hempstead Town Council by Edward W. Scott (R–Albertson) and Dennis J. Walsh (R–Mineola), respectively.

==== County representation ====
Mineola is located in Nassau County's 9th Legislative district, which as of August 2025 is represented in the Nassau County Legislature by Scott Strauss (R–Mineola).

==== State representation ====
===== New York State Assembly =====
Mineola is located in the New York State Assembly's 19th State Assembly district, which as of August 2025 is represented in the New York State Assembly by Edward P. Ra (R–Garden City South).

===== New York State Senate =====
Mineola is located in the New York State Senate's 7th State Senate district, which as of August 2025 is represented in the New York State Senate by its former mayor, Jack M. Martins (R–Old Westbury).

==== Federal representation ====
===== United States Congress =====
The village of Mineola is located almost entirely within New York's 3rd Congressional district, which as of August 2025 is represented in the United States Congress by Thomas R. Suozzi (D–Glen Cove). The southern edge located in the Town of Hempstead, however, is represented by Laura Gillen (D-Baldwin), and is within New York's 4th Congressional district.

===== United States Senate =====
Like the rest of New York, Mineola is represented in the United States Senate by Charles Schumer (D) and Kirsten Gillibrand (D).

=== Politics ===
In the 2020 U.S. presidential election, the majority of Mineola voters voted for Donald J. Trump (R).

== Education ==
=== Public ===
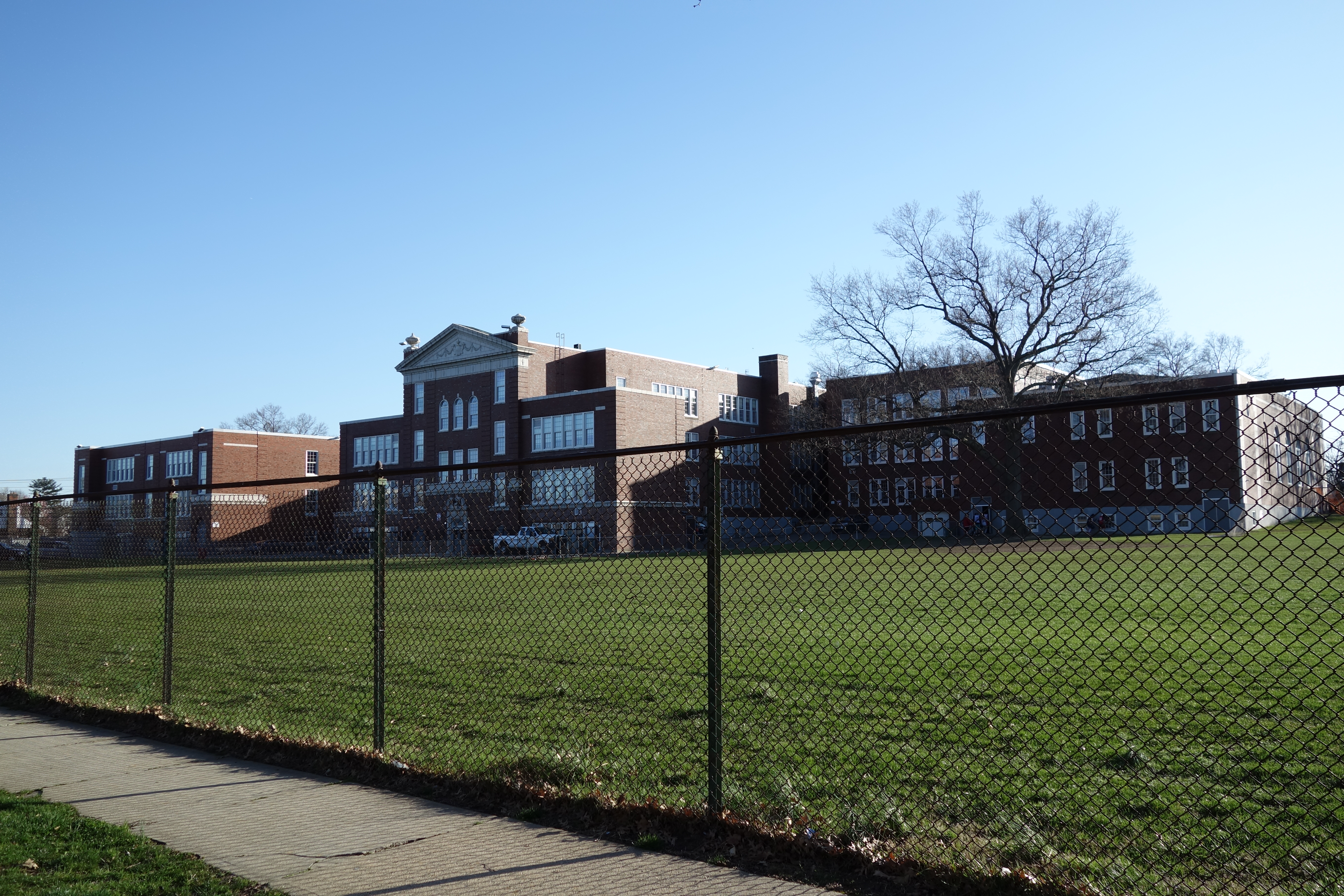
Mineola Middle School in 2018

The Village of Mineola is primarily located within the boundaries of (and is thus served by) the Mineola Union Free School District. Smaller sections of Mineola are in the East Williston UFSD, Carle Place UFSD, and the Garden City UFSD.Accordingly, children who reside within Mineola and attend public schools go to school in one of these four districts, depending on where they live within the village.

=== Private ===
The private Chaminade High School – an elite and prestigious all-boys Catholic high school – is located within the village.

The village is also home to the New York University Grossman Long Island School of Medicine, which is one of the two medical schools of New York University, the other being NYU Grossman School of Medicine located in Manhattan.

== Infrastructure ==
=== Transportation ===
==== Road ====
Jericho Turnpike (NY 25) passes through the village and Hillside Avenue (NY 25B) forms part of its northern border. Old Country Road also passes through the village and forms its border with Garden City.

Other major roads within the village include Mineola Boulevard, Roslyn Road, and Willis Avenue.

Additionally, the historic Long Island Motor Parkway formerly ran north–south through the village; the right-of-way is now used by the Long Island Power Authority for a high-voltage power transmission line.

==== Rail ====
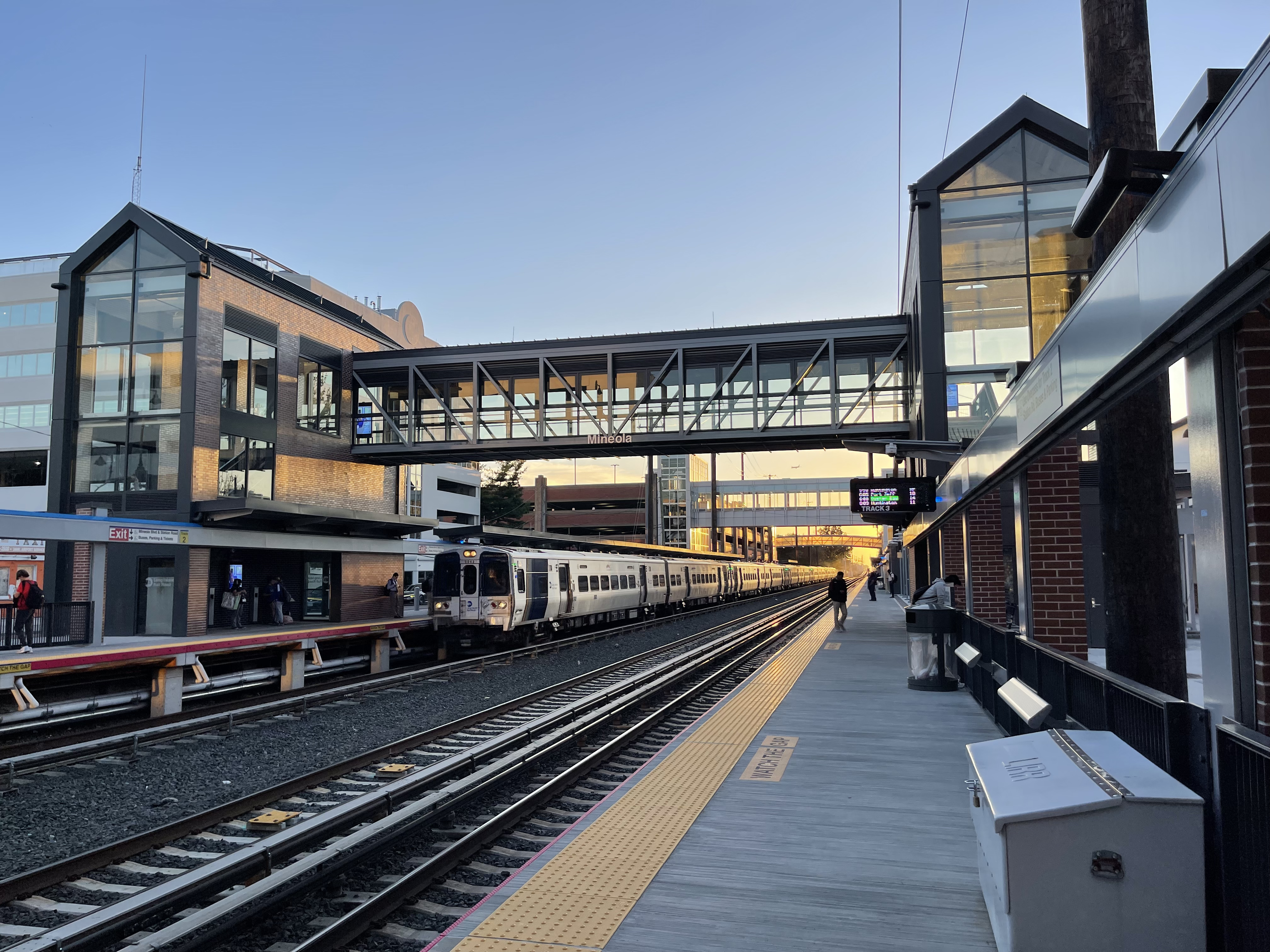
The Mineola LIRR station in 2023

The Mineola station on the Long Island Rail Road's Main Line is located within the village. It serves trains on the Oyster Bay, Ronkonkoma, and Port Jefferson Branches, as well as limited service on the Montauk Branch.

==== Bus ====
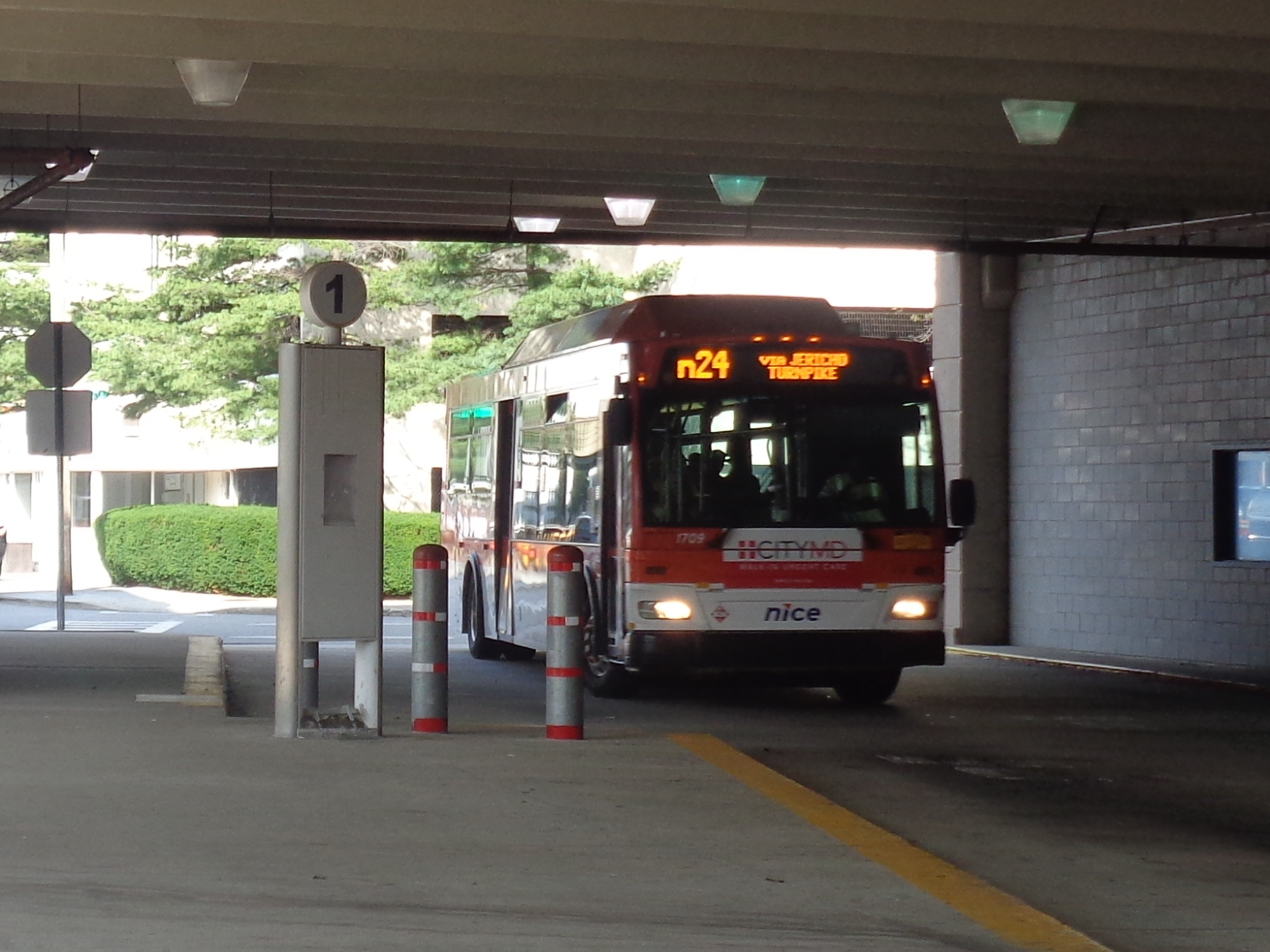
An n24 bus pulling into the Mineola Intermodal Center in 2017

Mineola's Mineola Intermodal Center contains the Long Island Rail Road station and a Nassau Inter-County Express (NICE) bus terminal; the Mineola Intermodal Center is one of Nassau County's main bus hubs. Mineola is served by the following routes:

- n15: Mineola – Long Beach (rush hours only)
- n22: Jamaica – Hicksville via Hillside Avenue & Prospect Avenue
- n22X: Jamaica – Roosevelt Field Mall
- n23: Mineola – Manorhaven
- n24: Jamaica – Hicksville via Jericho Turnpike & Old Country Road
- n40: Mineola – Freeport
- n40x: Mineola – Freeport

NICE's n27 bus routes also serve Mineola, but they do not stop at the Mineola Intermodal Center.

=== Utilities ===
==== Natural gas ====
National Grid USA provides natural gas to homes and businesses that are hooked up to natural gas lines in Mineola.

==== Power ====
PSEG Long Island provides power to all homes and businesses within Mineola.

==== Sewage ====
Mineola is connected to sanitary sewers. The village maintains a sanitary sewer system which flows into Nassau County's system, which treats the sewage from the village's system through the Nassau County-owned sewage treatment plants.

The village's sanitary sewer system is roughly 70 miles (110 km) in total length.

==== Water ====
The Village of Mineola owns and maintains its own water supply system. Mineola's municipal water supply system serves the entire village with water.

== Notable people ==
=== Entertainment ===
- Lenny Bruce (1925–1966), comedian
- John Burstein (born 1949), creator of Slim Goodbody ("the Superhero of Health")
- Jenna Busch (born 1973), entertainment journalist known for working on sites like IGN, Huffington Post, Coming Soon, JoBlo, SheKnows, Collider, and Stan Lee's World of Heroes
- Jean Butler, (born 1971), Stepdancer, master of Irish Dance, choreographer, and actress. Known for Riverdance
- Emmy Clarke (born 1991), actress who played the recurring character Julie Teeger on the USA Network show Monk.
- Brian Dennehy (1938–2020), actor
- Andrew Heermans (born 1953), musician, mixer, audio, and mastering engineer
- Jimmy Hines (1903–1986), professional golfer
- Kevin James (born 1965), actor, comedian, star of films and television series The King of Queens
- Jack Kirby (1917–1994), comic book artist
- James Patrick Kelly (born 1951), Hugo Award-winning author
- Jackie Martling (born 1948), comedian and former writer for The Howard Stern Show
- Sally Menke (1953–2010), film editor who worked in cinema and television
- Lia Purpura (born 1964), poet, writer and educator
- Steve Rawlins (born 1954), musician, composer, arranger, musical director, and author
- Kim Richards (born 1964), child actress who starred in Nanny and the Professor, Escape to Witch Mountain, No Deposit, No Return, and Return from Witch Mountain
- Lauren Scala (born 1982), WNBC and New York Nonstop correspondent
- Robert B. Silvers (1929–2017), editor of The New York Review of Books
- Joe Simon (1913–2011), comic book writer, artist, editor, and publisher
- Eric Staller (born 1947), mixed media artist
- Katherine Teck (born 1939), author and composer
- Timothy Treadwell (1957–2003), bear enthusiast
- Trisha Ventker (born 1967), author and photographic artist
- Tiffany Vollmer (born 1973), voice actress best known for portraying Bulma from Dragon Ball
- Peter Walker (born 1927), film, stage and television actor
- W. D. Wetherell (born 1948), writer of books, novels, short story collections, memoirs, essay collections, travel and history

=== Politics and government ===
- Lloyd Bryce (1851–1917), diplomat and one-term congressman of New York's 7th congressional district
- Steven Derounian (1918–2007), congressman of New York's 2nd and 3rd congressional districts
- Herb Guenther (1941–2021), politician who was a member of both the Arizona House of Representatives and the Arizona State Senate
- Martin W. Littleton (1872–1934), politician and attorney known for involvement in high-profile trials during the early 1900s
- Carolyn McCarthy (born 1944), politician who served as the U.S. representative for New York's 4th congressional district from 1997 to 2015
- Bill Owens, former Congressman for New York's 23rd District
- Ed Ra (born 1981), Republican member of the New York State Assembly, representing the 19th district
- Gerry Studds (1937–2006), Democratic congressman of Massachusetts who was the first member of Congress to be openly gay
- Frances Townsend (born 1961), US Homeland Security Adviser under President George W. Bush
- Mitchell Van Yahres (1926–2008), Democrat mayor of Charlottesville, Virginia and served in the Virginia House of Delegates
- Paula Xinis (born 1968), United States district judge of the United States District Court for the District of Maryland, appointed by former President Barack Obama
- Frank E. Young (1931–2019), physician who served as Commissioner of Food and Drugs and deputy assistant secretary in the United States Department of Health and Human Services

=== Academia and journalism ===
- Elizabeth Bunce (1915–2003), geophysicist who became the first female chief scientist of an oceanic expedition at Woods Hole Oceanographic Institution
- Michael Burns (born 1947), historian and retired actor
- Donald C. Hood (born 1941), professor in Psychology and Professor of Ophthalmic Science in the Department of Psychology at Columbia University
- Elliot G. Jaspin (born 1946), 1979 winner of the Pulitzer Prize for Investigative Reporting
- Monroe Karmin (1929–1999), journalist who won a Pulitzer Prize in 1967
- Jonathan LaPook (born 1953), physician in internal medicine and gastroenterology
- Paul A. Libby (1921–2021), professor of mechanical and aerospace engineering at the University of California, San Diego
- John F. Murray (1927–2020), pulmonologist best known for his work on acute respiratory distress syndrome (ARDS)
- Deborah Nickerson (1954–2021), professor of genome sciences at the University of Washington
- Gary Schwartz (born 1944), psychologist, author, parapsychologist and professor at the University of Arizona
- Frank Wilczek (born 1951), theoretical physicist, mathematician and Nobel laureate

=== Business ===
- Kenneth Chenault (born 1951), CEO of American Express
- Louis V. Gerstner, Jr., former chairman of IBM and former chairman of the Carlyle Group
- Lou Gerstner (born 1942), businessman, best known for his tenure as chairman of the board and chief executive officer of IBM
- Stu Shea (born 1957), business executive and intelligence professional
- Bronson Thayer (1939–2016), chairman of the board and past chief executive officer of Bay Cities Bank

=== Sports ===
- Bob Bill (1940–2012), football player and businessman
- Aud Brindley (1923–1957), basketball player for the New York Knicks
- Gary Christenson (born 1953), former Major League Baseball pitcher who played for two seasons
- Xavier Edwards (born 1999), professional baseball infielder for the Miami Marlins
- Julia Elbaba (born 1994), former professional tennis player
- Jack Emmer, all-time winningest Division I men's college lacrosse coach for Army
- Steve Falteisek (born 1972), former Major League Baseball pitcher for the Montreal Expos and the Milwaukee Brewers
- Luis Felipe Fernandes (born 1996), professional soccer player who currently plays for USL Championship side Sacramento Republic
- Jimmy Hines (1903–1986), professional golfer
- Cannon Kingsley (born 2001), professional tennis player
- Pete Koegel (1947–2023), professional baseball first baseman, catcher, and outfielder
- Warren Koegel (born 1949), professional football player and college athletics administrator
- B. J. LaMura (born 1981), professional baseball pitcher who played for Italy in the 2009 World Baseball Classic
- Kevin Lowe, retired professional lacrosse player who played professional box lacrosse in the National Lacrosse League and professional field lacrosse in Major League Lacrosse
- Manny Matos (born 1953), retired American soccer player who played professionally in the North American Soccer League and Major Indoor Soccer League
- Len Mattiace (born 1967), professional golfer, formerly of the PGA Tour and now playing on the PGA Tour Champions
- Carlos Mendes (born 1980), defender for Major League Soccer side New York Red Bulls
- Brian Mullan (born 1978), former professional soccer player who played for the Los Angeles Galaxy, San Jose Earthquakes, Houston Dynamo, and Colorado Rapids in Major League Soccer
- Garrett Pilon (born 1998), son of former NHLer Rich Pilon, Garrett plays in the NHL for the Ottawa Senators and Belleville Senators of the American Hockey League (AHL)
- Douglas Razzano (born 1988), former competitive figure skater and the 2014 CS Ice Challenge champion
- John Valentin (born 1967), former MLB player
- Lillian Watson (born 1950), former competition swimmer, a two-time Olympic champion, and a former world record-holder in three events
- Chris Weidman (born 1984), UFC Middleweight Champion

=== Other notable people ===
- James L. Fowler (1931–2015), marine who was the founder of the Marine Corps Marathon
- Marie Jerge (born 1953), former bishop of the Evangelical Lutheran Church in America
- Diane Macedo (born 1982), news anchor for ABC News
- Gregory Parkes and Stephen D. Parkes (born 1964 and 1965, respectively), prelates of the Roman Catholic Church

== Sister city ==
Mineola is twinned with:

- Estarreja, Portugal (2024)

== See also ==
- List of municipalities in New York
- Mineola Union Free School District
