= Alan Schriesheim =

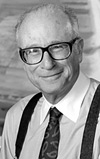
- Born: March 8, 1930 (age 95); Queens, New York, United States
- Education: Polytechnic Institute of New York, Bachelor of Science in Chemistry 1951; Penn State University PhD in Chemistry 1954
- Occupation(s): Retired CEO and Director Emeritus of Argonne National Laboratories
- Office: Director and CEO of Argonne National Laboratory
- Predecessor: Walter Massey
- Successor: Dean E. Eastman
- Spouse(s): Beatrice (wife; deceased)

Alan Schriesheim is the Director Emeritus and the retired CEO of Argonne National Laboratory, one of the U.S. Department of Energy's largest research centers. In a January 2008 announcement issued by Penn State University upon the establishment of the Schriesheim Distinguished Graduate Fellowship, it was noted that "Schriesheim is an internationally acclaimed chemist and technology executive. With a career spanning 50 years in industry, academia, and government, Schriesheim was a pioneer in transforming large and highly complex research organizations to yield productive commercialized technology.

== Early childhood and education ==
Alan Schriesheim was born in 1930 in Far Rockaway, Queens, New York. He graduated from Far Rockaway High School in 1948 where he played football. Schriesheim graduated from Penn State in 1954 with a PhD in chemistry, having earned his bachelor's degree from The Polytechnic Institute of New York University (known then as Brooklyn Polytechnic Institute) in 1951. He was the first person in his family to attend college, his father had a 6th grade education and was a furniture store manager.

== Career ==
Schriesheim joined The National Bureau of Standards (renamed the National Institute of Standards and Technology) as a research chemist immediately after graduating with his PhD and worked there from 1954 to 1956. Schriesheim joined Exxon in 1956 and worked there for 27 years until 1982, rising through the organization to become general manager of Exxon Engineering and director of Exxon Corporate Research. In 1983, he became director and CEO of the Argonne National Laboratory, while also holding a dual appointment as a Professor of Chemistry at The University of Chicago, retiring in 1996. He was the first director of a major national laboratory to have an extensive industrial background.

== Awards and honors ==
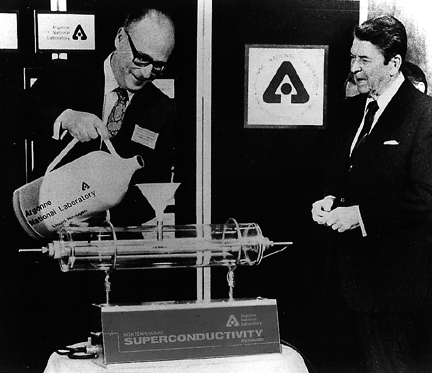
Argonne CEO Alan Schriesheim and U.S. President Ronald Reagan in 1987 during demonstration of high-temperature superconductivity (U.S. Department of Energy Office of Science)

While at Exxon, he won the American Chemical Society's George Olah award for research in petroleum chemistry in 1969.

Schriesheim served on several public corporate boards, many university and government advisory committees, and is a member of the National Academy of Engineering and holds 22 U.S. patents. He is a member of the board of directors of publicly traded HEICO, an aerospace and defense electronics company, and was a former board member of Sun Electric Company and of Rohm and Haas a Fortune 500 chemical company.

He received several honorary doctorate degrees including a 2001 honorary degree in science from Penn State, and in 2005 he was named a Distinguished Alumnus, the highest honor the university can bestow on its graduates. He also holds honorary degrees from Penn State, Illinois Institute of Technology and Northern Illinois University and is a board member of Children's Memorial Hospital in Chicago, Illinois. Dr. Schriesheim continues to reside in Chicago and is president of The Chicago Council on Science and Technology.

In 1987, Argonne Director and CEO Alan Schriesheim demonstrated high-temperature superconductivity to U.S. President Ronald Reagan at a 1987 superconductor applications meeting. He was elected a member of the National Academy of Engineering in 1989 for innovative chemical and chemical engineering research and for leadership in both the academic and the industrial sectors.

In 1996, Schriesheim became a Lincoln Laureate and was awarded The Order of Lincoln by The Lincoln Academy of Illinois – the highest honor awarded by the State of Illinois. Other notable Lincoln Laureates include 1981 Laureate U.S. President Ronald Reagan, artist LeRoy Neiman, Olympic Gold Medal winner Jacqueline Joyner-Kersee, author Studs Terkel, author Scott Turow, scientist and Nobel Laureate Leon M. Lederman, actor Charlton Heston, writer and Nobel Laureate Saul Bellow, architect Ludwig Mies van der Rohe, .

According to the Official History of The Lincoln Academy:

The Order of Lincoln was established in 1964 by Proclamation of Illinois Governor Otto Kerner to honor individuals whose contributions to the betterment of humanity have been accomplished in Illinois, or, whose achievements have brought honor to the state because of their identity with it, whether by birth or residence, or whose dedication to the principles of public service inspire all Illinoisans to respond to what Lincoln called 'the better angels of our nature'. To insure that no political connotation should surround the award, an independent, non-partisan entity was established to administer the program. Thus, the Order of Lincoln and the Lincoln Academy (based respectively upon the French Legion of Honor and the French Academy) were established, with Michael Butler, the Academy's first chancellor, as its primary architect. In 1989, as part of the Academy's twenty-fifth anniversary, Governor James R. Thompson declared the Order of Lincoln to be 'the state's highest award' and every Illinois Governor since then has so described it. Each honoree receives a warrant signed by the Governor and bearing the Great Seal of the State of Illinois, certifying his or her investiture as a Laureate of the Order of Lincoln.

== Family ==
He and Beatrice, his late wife of fifty years, met while they were both graduate students in Chemistry at Penn State. Beatrice Schriesheim (née Brand) was born in 1930 in Poland and survived the Holocaust by escaping the Nazi invasion in 1939 and surviving imprisonment in Siberia . She arrived in the U.S. in 1947 and received her undergraduate degree from Queen's College in New York before attending Penn State's Graduate School . She was a long-time high school chemistry teacher who was committed to her students as well as to the improvement of science education in the United States . She played a leadership role in the Achievement Rewards for College Scientists (ARCS) organization. Her memoirs, "Bea's Journey", documented her Holocaust journey and her life in the United States and are included in the United States Holocaust Memorial Museum . They were published in 2003 after her death at the age of 73. She shared her husband's affection and enthusiasm for the university and for helping outstanding students through scholarship support. Alan and Bea Schriesheim had two children, Laura Lyn and Robert A. Schriesheim, and six grandchildren.

== Philanthropy ==
The Schriesheim Distinguished Graduate Fellowship, according to a press release issued by The Penn State University, was established at Penn State University by Penn State alumnus Alan Schriesheim in January 2008 who gave $250,000 to the Eberly College of Science to create a Distinguished Graduate Fellowship.

According to the January 2008 Penn State press release, The fellowship, named for the donor and his late wife, Beatrice "Bea" Schriesheim, will help the Eberly College of Science to recruit academically talented first-year graduate students who are pursuing doctoral degrees, according to Dean Daniel Larson. First preference will be given to students majoring in chemistry.

Penn State's Distinguished Graduate Fellowship program is a university-wide program that aims to attract the nation's most capable graduate students. When a fellowship is fully funded at its $250,000 minimum, the university, through the Graduate School and the fellowship's affiliate college, will match the endowment's annual spendable income in perpetuity, thus increasing the amount available to the recipient in the form of tuition aid, a stipend, and health insurance.

“The Schriesheim Fellowship will have an impact that will last beyond our lifetimes and will influence bright students and future discoveries,” said Larson. “We are grateful to Alan for recognizing the value of such a fellowship to the Eberly College and to generations of its students.”
