= Trisha Ventker =

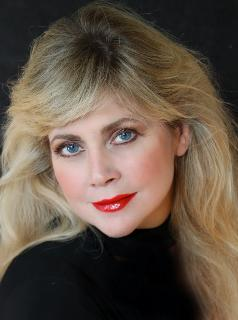
- Born: Patricia Small; 1967 (age 58–59); Mineola, New York
- Education: SUNY, Master's degree
- Occupations: Author, photographic artist, teacher
- Known for: Internet Dates From Hell
- Spouse: Thomas Ventker
- Children: Tristan Ventker
- Website: Author; Photography

Trisha Ventker (born 1967) is an author, photographic artist, and elementary school teacher. She is best known for her book Internet Dates From Hell which is self-published by Ventker through iUniverse and has since had the movie rights to it optioned to Paula Wagner. She is also one of the first Indie Books authors to have a book that was optioned for the big screen.

== Early life ==
Ventker grew up on Long Island, New York and has three older brothers. She attended Holy Trinity High School and graduated in 1984. She attended nursing school at Nassau Community College and received an Associate degree before proceeding to State University of New York at Old Westbury where she earned her Bachelor's degree in Education. After obtaining employment in the education field, she went on to earn her Master's degree as a reading specialist from Adelphi University.

== Professional career ==
=== Internet Dates From Hell ===
Internet Dates From Hell is a memoir based on Ventker's experience of trying to find her soul mate through internet dating. The book is filled with many of her personal experiences including meeting a guy who claimed that the United States government was being led by Satan and that he had videotape evidence that aliens exist.

=== Photographic art ===
Ventker is the founder and owner of Enchanted Inspire Photographic Art which was voted No. 2 on the Denver A List in 2011. Ventker has had many pieces featured in auctions and galleries throughout the United States including the Sotheby's Masterpiece Private Art Auction in 2011. Ventker's work has also been featured in Stylenik and she has also performed photographic shoots for Land Rover and Bing.

== In the media ==
Ventker has been in the media numerous times for Internet Dates From Hell. In addition to numerous articles in Match.com, Ventker has also been interviewed by Adam Curry from the Big Book Show and featured on Fox 31 News. Ventker also made an appearance on the Dr. Keith Ablow Show on the segment "Inside the Mind of the Single Woman" and her personal story was featured in More Magazine.

== Philanthropy ==
Ventker has been involved in numerous charity and fundraising activities. In addition to donating packages from her photo studio, Ventker has also donated hundreds of hours creating charity calendars such as "The Spirit of Flight Center Rods and Wings" and "The Vista Vixens" calendar for Charity Water.
