= Lauren Scala =

American television reporter

- Born: February 10, 1982 (age 44); Mineola, New York
- Occupation: Reporter
- Notable credit(s): Reporter (WNBC), Correspondent (New York Live)
- Website: https://laurenscala.com/

Lauren Scala (born February 10, 1982) is an Emmy Award winning television host and reporter based in New York City.

== Early and personal life ==
Scala was born and grew up in Mineola, New York, and attended Mineola High School. She graduated from Fordham University in 2004 with a degree in Communications. She currently resides in Manhattan.

== Career ==
Prior to her on-air career, Lauren worked at Metro-Goldwyn-Mayer and DreamWorks Pictures in movie studio publicity and events.

Scala previously hosted several half-hour shows for NBC's digital cable channel New York Nonstop as far back as 2008, including "In the Wings," a backstage guide to everything Broadway, "Don't Miss This" a collaboration with Time Out New York Magazine, "The Great American Health Challenge", New York City's first local fitness-themed reality competition show, and "Nonstop Sound," a show about music in the big apple.

In 2009, Scala hosted the official broadcast of the 52nd Annual New York Emmy Awards, which aired Thursday, April 9, 2009 on NYCTV, a division of NYC Media Group.

Since 2011, she has been a correspondent for WNBC's weekday lifestyle show "New York Live," covering a variety of beats, but mainly the city's restaurant scene. For over a decade, Scala was a part of WNBC's morning news team as the traffic/transit anchor on Today in New York.

In her early days at the station, Lauren was the host of WNBC's Live Interactive Trivia Game on the Saturday edition of Today in New York during the 9 am broadcast. She has also appeared as a guest host on NBC’s national travel show "1st Look" and has co-hosted Beat Bobby Flay on Food Network. She anchored the NYC St. Patrick's Parade Broadcast on WNBC from 2014 to 2018.
