= Manny Matos (soccer) =

American soccer player

Personal information
- Full name: Manuel Matos
- Date of birth: May 9, 1953 (age 73)
- Place of birth: Mineola, New York, U.S.
- Height: 5 ft 9 in (1.75 m)
- Positions: Midfielder; defender

Youth career
- 1971–1974: Adelphi University

Senior career*
Years	Team	Apps	(Gls)
1975–1978	Seattle Sounders	28	(0)
1979	Los Angeles Skyhawks		
1980–1981	Buffalo Stallions (indoor)	2	(0)
- * Club domestic league appearances and goals

Manuel Matos (born May 9, 1953) is an American retired soccer player who played professionally in the North American Soccer League and Major Indoor Soccer League.

Matos graduated from Mineola High School where he was the 1970 Nassau County Soccer Player of the Year. He attended Adelphi University, where he played on the school's 1974 NCAA Men's Division II Soccer Championship team. He is a member of the school's Athletic Hall of Fame. In 1975, the Seattle Sounders selected Matos with the first pick of the North American Soccer League draft. He signed with the Sounders in February 1975, but did not report to the team until after he graduated from Adelphi in the spring. Matos spent most of his first season with the reserves before becoming a regular first team player in 1976. In 1979, he moved to the Los Angeles Skyhawks of the American Soccer League. Matos also played for the Buffalo Stallions in the Major Indoor Soccer League. After retiring from professional soccer, Matos continued to play for Portuguese Sports in the Philadelphia leagues until 1992.

In 1980 he was contracted to play with ASL expansion team the Phoenix Fire, but the team folded in pre-season.
