= Internet Dates from Hell =

2006 book by Trisha Ventker

Internet Dates From Hell
- Author: Trisha Ventker
- Language: English
- Publisher: iUniverse, Inc.
- Publication date: August 29, 2006
- Pages: 158
- ISBN: 978-0595391158

Internet Dates From Hell was written by elementary school teacher and photographic artist Trisha Ventker. She holds a master's degree in education and has made numerous appearances on television and in print for her work on Internet Dates From Hell. The book was self-published by Ventker through iUniverse.

== Summary ==
Internet Dates From Hell is a memoir based on the author's experience of trying to find her soul mate through internet dating. The book is filled with many of her personal experiences including meeting a guy who claimed that the United States government was being led by Satan and that he had video tape evidence that aliens exist.

== Movie rights ==
In September 2011, Ventker optioned the rights to Internet Dates From Hell to Paula Wagner, producer of films such as the first three Mission Impossible movies, Vanilla Sky, and the Last Samurai. The rights include film, TV, and stage rights. Internet Dates From Hell is also one of the first Indie Books to be optioned. A tentative release date for the big screen is scheduled for 2014.

== See also ==
- Author Solutions
