= Mineola High School (New York) =

Coordinates: 40°44′31″N 73°39′27″W

- 10 Armstrong Road; Garden City Park, New York, US

Information
- Type: Comprehensive school
- Established: 1962 (current high school)
- School district: Mineola Union Free School District
- Principal: Rory Parnell
- Teaching staff: 105.38 FTEs
- Grades: 8-12
- Enrollment: 1,090 (as of 2024-2025)
- Student to teacher ratio: 10.34
- Colors: Red, white and black
- Nickname: The Mustangs
- Website: www.mineola.k12.ny.us/mineola-high-school-home

Mineola High School is a public high school in the Mineola Union Free School District and is located in Garden City Park, New York, United States. It serves Mineola, as well as certain parts of Albertson, Williston Park, Garden City Park, and Roslyn Heights.

== History ==
The current high school opened in 1962, replacing the old high school, built in 1927, which now houses the Mineola Middle School. In 2016, the high school underwent a multimillion-dollar renovation, which included the refurbishment of the school's library. The Mineola High School, as well as the Middle School served as a filming location for the movie Detachment directed by Tony Kaye.

Mineola's mascot is the Mustang, which replaced the original “Maroon” mascot in the early 1960s.

Since 2022, Mineola High School has incorporated a second building to their campus, calling it "Synergy" which changes the way the traditional high school concept is done. They planned to create a high school program that was centered around the students by listening to the students themselves.

== Fine arts ==
The Mineola Union Free School District was recognized as being one of the best communities for music education in the United States from 2009 to 2026. In the winter months the Mineola Colorguard produces two indoor performance ensembles. Mineola White is composed of first-year members and competes in the Scholastic Novice Class in local competition. Mineola Red, an all-veteran ensemble, competes nationally in Winter Guard International (WGI). In 2006 Mineola High School became the first Scholastic colorguard program on Long Island to attend the prestigious WGI World Championships. In February 2009 Mineola Red was crowned the WGI Northeast Regional Scholastic A Champions at Trumbull, Connecticut, and in April 2009 finished 21st out of 102 units at the WGI World Championships in Dayton, Ohio.

In 2010, Mineola Red was once again crowned the WGI Northeast Regional Scholastic A Champions at Trumbull. Then in April at Dayton, Ohio placed 16 out of more than 100 guards in Championships.

The Mineola Mustang Marching Band and Colorguard compete in the fall in the New York State Field Band Conference (NYSFBC) and were named the 2009, 2018 and 2019 New York State Small School Class 2 and 2022, 2023, 2025, and most recently 2026 New York State Field Band Conference New York State Small School Class 1 state champions making Mineola High School only the 4th school and 5th band to win back to back Small School Class 2 championships. In 2021, after moving up to New York State Small School Class 1, they finished in 3rd place. In 2022, the Mustang Marching Band won the Small School Class 1 Championship. The following season, in 2023, they repeated as champions with a score of 93.550. After a 2nd place finish in 2024, the Mustang Marching Band won back to back Championships in 2025 and 2026, capping their 2025 championship with a record score of 95.05.

== Athletics ==
The Mineola boys spring Track and Field team won Nassau County Championships in 2010. The Mineola boys' varsity soccer team won the Nassau & Long Island Championship in 2005 and 2023 and won Conference ABC 1 in 2006. The girls' softball team has won Nassau County, Long Island, and state championships in its history. Its football team is among the top 50 in New York State for longest winning streaks, going 28–0–2 over several years.

== Demographics ==
As of the 2024–2025 school year, the school had an enrollment of 1,090 students and 105.38 classroom teachers (on an FTE basis), for a student–teacher ratio of 10.34. There were 290 students eligible for free lunch and 34 students eligible for reduced-cost lunch.

== Notable alumni ==
- Steven Boghos Derounian (Class of 1934), United States Congressman
- Carolyn McCarthy (Class of 1962), United States Congresswoman
- Jack Emmer (Class of 1963), Hall of Fame Army lacrosse coach
- Stephen Schwartz (Class of 1964), noted Broadway composer of Pippin, Godspell and Wicked.
- Manny Matos (Class of 1971), professional soccer player
- Thomas DiNapoli (Class of 1972), New York State Comptroller
- Richie Meade (Class of 1972), Navy lacrosse coach
- Haywood Nelson (Class of 1978), actor from What's Happening!!
- Amit M. Shelat (Class of 1993), Chairman of the New York State Board for Medicine (December 2024-Current), Vice Chairman of the New York State Board for Medicine (2018-2024), New York State Education Department
- Karla Cavalli (Class of 1994), Miss New York USA 2002, Emmy nominated actress, host, writer and producer, Host of Travel Channel's Planet Primetime
- Diane Macedo (Class of 2000), tv news anchor and journalist
- Lauren Scala (Class of 2000), WNBC and New York Nonstop correspondent
