= Elizabeth Bunce =

American geophysicist

- Born: April 25, 1915; Mineola, New York
- Died: December 13, 2003 (aged 88); Falmouth, Massachusetts
- Education: Smith College
- Scientific career
- Fields: Geophysics
- Workplaces: Woods Hole Oceanographic Institution

Elizabeth "Betty" Thompson Bunce (April 25, 1915 – December 13, 2003) was an American geophysicist who became the first female chief scientist of an oceanic expedition at Woods Hole Oceanographic Institution.

== Early life and education ==
Bunce was born in Mineola, New York on April 25, 1915. After graduating from Northfield School in 1933, she attended Smith College to study physical education. In 1941 she received her certificate in physical education, spending the next four years as a physical education teacher. During the summer of 1944, Bunce visited a friend working at the Woods Hole Oceanographic Institution. This began her long affiliation with the institute where she began working over summers. This research inspired her to return to Smith College for her master's degree in physics.

== Career ==
After earning her masters, Bunce worked as a physics instructor at Smith from 1949 to 1951. In July 1952 she joined Woods Hole Oceanographic Institution as a full-time research associate. In 1964 she was appointed an associate scientist, later becoming a senior scientist and eventually a scientist emeritus in 1980. Bunce served as the Acting Chair of the Geology and Geophysics several times throughout the 1970s and 1980s, becoming the first female department chair at the institution. She was also the first American female chief scientist on an oceanic expedition. Her research interests included crustal structure, marine seismology, reflection and refraction, and underwater acoustics.

Bunce was a fellow of the Geological Society of America, as well as a member of the Society of Exploration Geophysicists, the American Geophysical Union, and the American Association of Petroleum Geologists.

== Awards ==
- Smith College awarded Bunce with an Honorary Doctor of Science in 1971.
- She was honored at the Woods Hole Oceanographic Institution "Woman Pioneers in Oceanography" seminar in March 1995 for her many contributions to oceanography.
- The Bunce Fault in the Puerto Rican Trench, the deepest part of the Atlantic Ocean, was named in her honor.
