= Mineola Union Free School District =

School district in the U.S. state of New York

Address
- 121 Jackson Avenue, Mineola, NY 11501 Mineola, New York United States

District information
- Type: Public school district
- Motto: “...For a lifetime of learning”
- Grades: PK–12
- Interim Superintendent: Catherine Fishman
- Schools: 5
- NCES District ID: 3619500

Students and staff
- Students: 2,907 (2020–21)
- Teachers: 241.76 (FTE)
- Student–teacher ratio: 12.02

Other information
- Website: www.mineola.k12.ny.us

Mineola Union Free School District is a public school district based in Mineola, New York, United States. It serves Mineola, as well as certain parts of Albertson, Williston Park, Garden City Park, and Roslyn Heights.

The school district serves 2,927 students across 5 schools.

== History ==
The original high school opened in 1927, and was replaced by the current one in 1962.The old high school is now Mineola Middle School. The district was first awarded an Apple Distinguished School designation in 2013 with their middle school. Jackson Avenue School was the next to be honored in 2015, with the other schools joining in 2017. Since 2010, the district has recognized that iPad and other technology would change the way the learning environment works.

== Area served ==
=== Location and area ===
The Mineola Union Free School District serves parts of the following communities:

- Mineola
- Garden City Park
- Williston Park
- Albertson
- Roslyn Heights

== Schools ==
The Mineola Union Free School District contains the following schools:

=== High School (Grades 8-12) ===
- Mineola High School

=== Mineola Middle School (Grades 5-7) ===
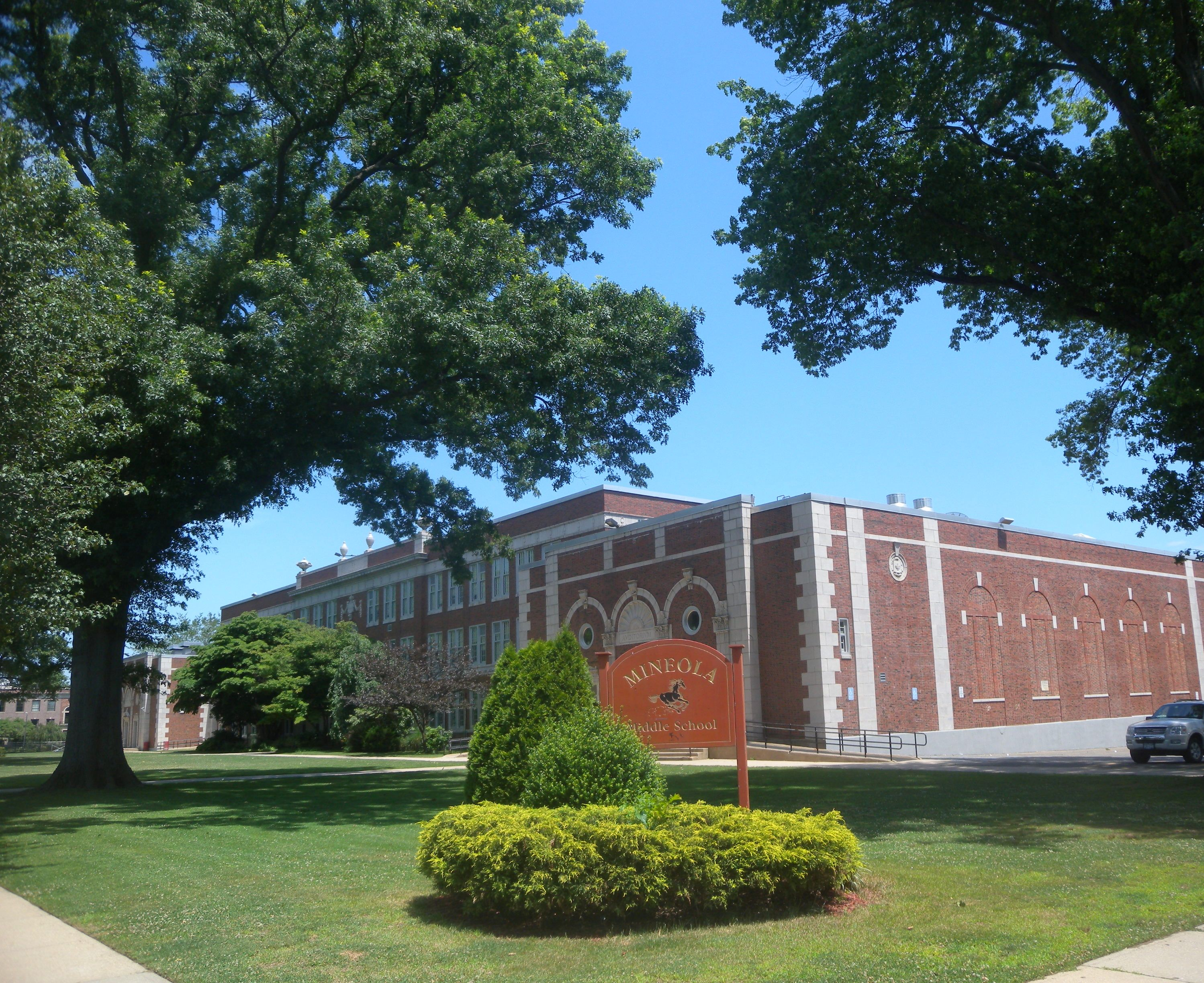
Mineola Middle School in 2012.

- Mineola Middle School

=== Elementary schools ===
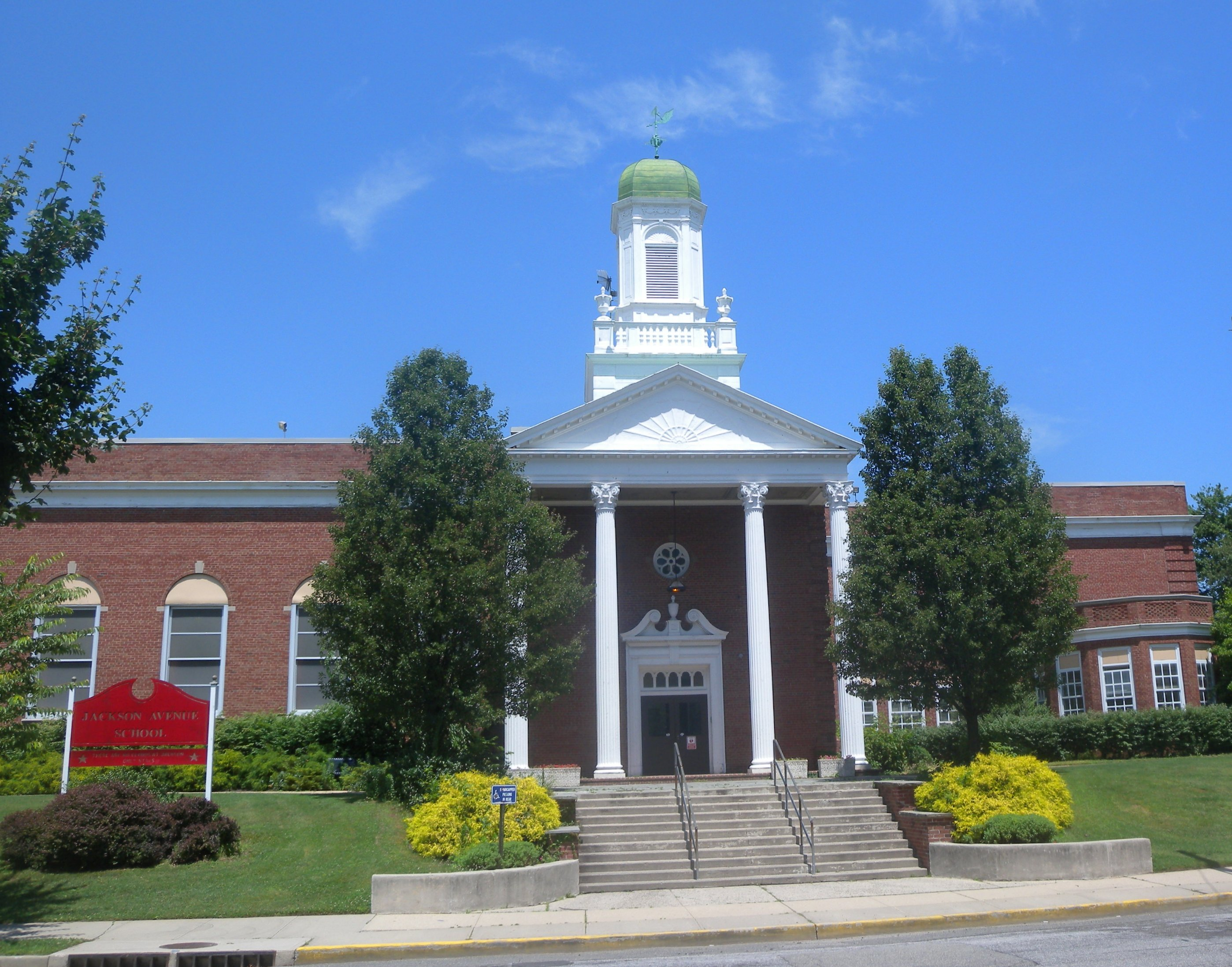
Jackson Avenue School in 2012.

- Hampton Street School (Pre-K - Grade 2)
- Jackson Avenue School (Grades 3 & 4)
- Meadow Drive School (Pre-K - Grade 2)

== See also ==
- List of school districts in New York
