= Aon Hewitt =

American consulting company

- Type: Subsidiary
- Industry: Human resource consulting Outsourcing
- Founded: October 1, 1940; 86 years ago, in Lake Forest, Illinois, United States
- Founder: Edwin "Ted" Hewitt
- Headquarters: Lincolnshire, Illinois, United States
- Key people: Kristi A. Savacool (CEO)
- Services: Human capital Management consulting
- Number of employees: ~22,000
- Parent: Aon
- Website: aon.com/human-capital-consulting

Aon Hewitt (formerly known as Hewitt Associates) was a provider of human capital and management consulting services headquartered in Lincolnshire, Illinois in the United States. From 500 offices in 120 countries, it provided consulting, outsourcing, and reinsurance brokerage services. The "Aon Hewitt" brand and legal entities have now been absorbed into the "Aon" business, leaving obsolete the names "Hewitt" and "Aon Hewitt."

Hewitt Associates was founded in 1940 and ceased to exist as an independent entity at the completion of its purchase by Aon in October 2010. Hewitt's operations were then merged with some elements of Aon's consulting arm to become a new subsidiary of the Aon Group called Aon Hewitt. In 2017, the benefits outsourcing department of Aon Hewitt was acquired by Blackstone and rebranded as Alight Solutions.

== History ==
Hewitt Associates
- Type: Private
- Industry: Professional services
- Founded: 1940; 86 years ago, in Lake Forest, Illinois, United States
- Defunct: October 1, 2010
- Fate: Acquired by Aon
- Successor: Aon
- Headquarters: Lincolnshire, Illinois, United States
- Key people: Kristi Savacool (Co-CEO) Bal Dail (Co-CEO)
- Services: Human capital and management consulting services
- Revenue: $3.2 billion in fiscal 2008
- Number of employees: ~29,000
- Parent: Aon
- Website: www.aon.com

Hewitt Associates was founded in 1940 as "Edwin Shields Hewitt and Associates" and became an American provider of human capital and management consulting services. It operated 500 offices in 120 countries providing consulting, outsourcing, and insurance brokerage services.

Hewitt ceased to exist as an independent entity at the completion of its purchase by Aon in October 2010. Hewitt's operations were merged at that time with some elements of Aon's consulting arm to become a new subsidiary of the Aon Group called Aon Hewitt.

=== 1940s–1970s ===
Edwin "Ted" Hewitt founded Edwin Shields Hewitt and Associates on October 1, 1940, as a brokerage house focusing on insurance and personal financial services. During and after World War II, Hewitt's expertise became valuable when the government instituted "pay-as-you-go" income taxes in 1943 and the U.S. cost of living increased more than 25 percent in 1945. Once the war and its rationing ended, Americans returned to work and the economy recovered. Hewitt's clients, many of whom had manufactured goods for the war effort, returned to their customary businesses.

Hewitt began offering its clients statements to track their employee benefits and had pioneered the use of financial goals for company investments. Hewitt's programs were the first of their kind to be approved by the Internal Revenue Service; they were so useful that the U.S. Department of Labor asked the firm to create forms for the welfare and pension programs of the 1950s.

By the 1960s the Hewitt firm continued to expand its pension and benefit plans, and Hewitt became the first company to design pension and benefit plans tied to a corporation's revenue and growth projections. Hewitt was the only company asked by the U.S. government to consult on the Federal Interagency Task Force from 1964 to 1968. The task force was responsible for the design and implementation of the new Employee Retirement Income Security Act.

In the next decade Hewitt began offering its clients its Benefit Index to track the performance of benefit programs–an industry first. Hewitt also offered its clients flexible investment strategies for employee benefit packages, which led to the formation of a new consulting firm, the Hewitt Investment Group, in 1974.

=== 1980s and 1990s ===
In the 1980s Hewitt researched numerous issues and began issuing its findings industry-wide on subjects such as computer use for automated benefit calculations, offering benefits to part-time employees, full versus partial hospital reimbursement, fluctuating profit-sharing percentages, mental health benefits, 401(k) programs, and rising health plan deductibles.

The use of computers had begun to take hold in larger businesses, as Hewitt found automated benefit programs had increased remarkably from 1986 to 1988. In a survey detailed in PC Week (November 6, 1989), Hewitt had surveyed 700 companies to find 71 percent had become either fully or partially automated in their administration of benefits plans, up from 48 percent two years before. Hewitt designed computerized benefit programs and software so companies could manage their benefit plans. Hewitt Technologies was created in 1988 to monitor and respond to industries changing technological needs.

By the beginning of the 1990s Hewitt had ventured abroad and offered benefit programs to corporations in the United Kingdom. The firm had brought in more than $250 million in revenues for 1990 and was ranked the fourth largest benefit management and consulting firm in the world, according to Business Insurance magazine. Yet many of Hewitt's clients were feeling the pinch of a struggling economy and inflation. As companies began looking for ways to bolster the bottom line, benefits were often the first place executives looked for a quick fix. In a time when few received raises and those who did received only cost-of-living increases, Hewitt started retooling retirement packages and healthcare benefits to keep its customers from making drastic changes. Of particular interest were retirement programs to help seniors withstand the effects of inflation. Hewitt also researched other benefit additions such as flextime scheduling, child- and elder-care benefits, and it compared HMOs (health management organizations) versus PPOs (preferred provider organizations).

By 1997 more than 100 large companies outsourced their benefit programs to Hewitt, covering about nine million worldwide employees. The company ran into controversy, however, when it secured incentives to open a new benefits management center in Orlando, Florida. Public officials decried the incentives, believing that Hewitt was favored over other firms that could have offered more jobs and revenue for the city. Despite the furore, the new office opened in Orlando in 1997, during a fiscal year (ending in September) in which Hewitt's revenues reached close to $700 million.

In 1998 Hewitt partnered with the California-based Financial Engines, an online investment firm, to offer its clients financial advice over the Internet. Hewitt clients could seek online investment advice and make changes in real-time. Such advancements, along with being the first HR industry firm to launch a corporate web site, landed Hewitt among PC Week's Top Ten Most Technologically Innovative Companies. Hewitt also continued its surveys, developing the Health Value Initiative in 1999 to measure the effectiveness and quality of more than 2,000 healthcare programs worldwide.

=== 2000–2010 ===
By early 2000 Hewitt expanded with new offices near Houston, Texas, and a new office in Kuala Lumpur, Malaysia. The company also announced the merger of its British and Irish operations with the United Kingdom's Bacon & Woodrow, a retirement and HR management consulting firm.

Hewitt briefly offered Sageo, an online service where participants could compare, choose, and enroll in benefit programs. Sageo was designed for retirees and companies with older employees, to offer this growing population the same benefits provided to Hewitt's 150 corporate clients and their 15 million worldwide employees. Hewitt hoped that Sageo's online format would not only simplify the benefits process but lower employer costs as well. Within a few months of its debut, Sageo had enrolled nearly a dozen companies representing 500,000 individuals. However, Sageo never made money and was dismantled shortly thereafter.

In 2001 Hewitt announced its intention to become a publicly traded company after nearly six decades as a private firm. Under the ticker symbol HEW on the New York Stock Exchange, Hewitt went public on June 27, 2002, with an initial offering of 11 million shares (at $19 per share). Share prices rose to $23 the following day. Hewitt put its new funds to work, paying off debt, purchasing France's Finance Arbitage, an investment consultancy firm, and spearheading expansion plans for the United Kingdom and China.

In 2003 Hewitt took over the Cork, Ireland-based Becketts, a benefits consultancy, and bought the software programs and payroll services of Cyborg Worldwide Inc. These moves, along with several others, prompted the Chicago-based Crain's Chicago Business to name Hewitt one of the area's fastest growing public firms, with fiscal revenues topping $1.9 billion for the year. In 2004 Hewitt announced the purchase/merger of Irvine, California's Exult Inc., another HR and consulting firm. The deal was valued at close to $700 million and was expected to bring in combined revenues of more than $3 billion by the following fiscal year.

For 2004 Hewitt reached revenues of $2.2 billion and the firm sustained its 43rd consecutive year of growth. Employees numbered more than 22,000 in nearly three dozen countries (including Brazil, China, France, India, Ireland, The Netherlands, Puerto Rico, Singapore, and Switzerland) serving more than 18 million employees for its corporate clients. In addition, the company was named one of America's Most Admired Companies in 2004 by Fortune magazine, ranked as one of the 100 Best Places to Work for the fourth consecutive year by Computer World, and had become the United States' largest and the world's second largest benefits outsourcing company, according to Business Insurance magazine.

By early 2005 Hewitt had won business processing outsourcing contracts, signing publisher Thomson Corporation, Sun Microsystems, hospitality leader Marriott International, beverage giant PepsiCo Inc., Wachovia Corporation, and others to a roster of more than 2,500 international clients. As the year came to a close, Hewitt had fallen a bit short of its $3 billion goal, bringing in revenues of $2.8 billion. Analysts believed the business outsourcing market would top $33 billion or more in 2006.

=== 2010–2020 ===
On July 12, 2010, Chicago-based insurance broker, Aon, announced that it had agreed to buy Hewitt Associates for $4.9 billion in cash and stock. The purchase was complete as of October 1, 2010, and Hewitt's stock ticker (HEW) was removed from the NYSE. As of October 2012, there was little mention of the Hewitt name in the Aon web sites, although most of its services continued. The AON symbol on the New York Stock Exchange belonged to Aon plc, headquartered in London rather than Chicago since January.

On October 14, 2010, Aon said 1500 to 1800 jobs would be cut.

In 2017, part of Aon Hewitt was acquired by Blackstone and rebranded as Alight Solutions.

In March 2020, Aon had agreed to buy Willis Towers Watson months after the breakdown of negotiations between the two professional services firms. The merged business would have had a gross equity valuation of $80bn at the completion of the transaction which was initially expected in the first half of 2021. In July 2021, the deal was ultimately called off after the United States Justice Department issued a lawsuit, which would have delayed the deal until November 2022.

== Growth strategy ==
Prior to 2000, acquisitions and joint ventures were with very small boutique firms. The firms were primarily defined as benefit plan actuaries and human resources consultancies.

In 2000, Hewitt began growing through larger mergers and acquisitions. The first of these was the announcement, in late 2000, of a plan to integrate its UK and Ireland business with Bacon & Woodrow, a retirement and financial management consultancy in the UK.

In June 2003, Hewitt announced the completion of the acquisition of Northern Trust Retirement Consulting, L.L.C., expanding its portfolio of outsourcing clients. Later in 2003, Hewitt acquired Cyborg Worldwide, Inc., expanding outsourcing capabilities to include payroll services.

On October 1, 2004, Hewitt completed the acquisition of Irvine, California-based Exult Inc., a company specializing in Human Resources Business Process Outsourcing or HR BPO. This move was to ensure Hewitt would remain competitive within the HR consulting and outsourcing space, in which HRBPO was a rapidly growing area.

As of early 2010, Hewitt had approximately 2,600 clients, making it the world's largest provider of multi-service HR business process outsourcing, and it claimed to be the only firm fully integrated HR outsourcing and HR consulting. Hewitt's clients included over half the Fortune 500 and a third of the Fortune Global 500. Hewitt had 86 offices in 37 countries and employed over 27,000 employees. In 2012, the company also acquired Omnipoint, a major player in the Workday implementation space, and continues to be a key implementation partner for Workday.

=== Leadership changes ===
In June 2006, it was announced that CEO and Chairman Dale L. Gifford would be stepping down. The announcement was made in the face of Hewitt's declining stock performance and market worries about the entire BPO sector, but Gifford, who had been chief executive officer since 1992, indicated the decision was his own, and that he planned to retire.

Russell P. Fradin became CEO in September 2006. On December 12, 2009, Hewitt announced that Robert A. Schriesheim would be joining the company effective January 4, 2010, as SVP and CFO from Lawson Software, where he had been serving as CFO and a board member.

Fradin continued on as the CEO of the Aon Hewitt subsidiary after Aon Corporation's purchase of Hewitt was completed in November 2010. Fradin stepped down in May 2011. In the same month, Aon announced Kristi Savacool and Baljit Bail as the new co-CEOs of the company.
