= Alight Solutions =

Information Technology and consulting company based in Chicago, Illinois

Alight, Inc.
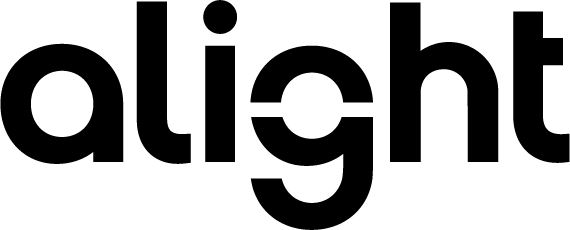
- Type: Public company
- Traded as: NYSE: ALIT (Class A); Russell 2000 component
- Industry: Professional services
- Founded: May 2017; 9 years ago
- Headquarters: Deerfield, Illinois, United States
- Number of locations: 15 (2024)
- Area served: United States, Canada
- Key people: Rohit Verma (CEO)
- Services: 401(k) retirement; Benefits consulting; Financial management; Human resources; Health benefits administration
- Revenue: ▼US$2.26 billion (2025)
- Net income: ▼ −US$3.10 billion (2025)
- Number of employees: Approx. 10,000 (2024)
- Website: alight.com

Alight Solutions is an American information technology and consulting company that provides cloud-based systems, outsourcing and consultancy related to human resource. They provide platforms and outsourcing for large companies to manage their human capital this includes health benefit administration, financial management and retirement planning.

The company is headquartered in Chicago, Illinois. The company went public on July 6, 2021, trading in the New York Stock Exchange under ALIT.

== History ==
=== Foundation ===
Alight was formed in May 2017 after the acquisition of the benefits outsourcing department of Aon Hewitt by private equity funds affiliated with Blackstone Group L.P.

=== Growth through acquisitions ===
In March 2018, Alight entered into a definitive agreement to acquire Future Knowledge, an HR advisory company in Australia and New Zealand. In July 2018, Alight acquired Compass Professional Health Services, a healthcare technology company based in Dallas, Texas.

In September 2018, India's third largest software services exporter Wipro announced a $1.5 billion, 10-year engagement with Alight Solutions. According to its contract with Alight, Wipro has been mandated to digitally transform the Illinois-headquartered company's business. In February 2019 Wipro went on to sell their Workday and Cornerstone OnDemand installations to Alight Solutions for $110 million.

On February 22, 2019, Alight announced the acquisition of Carlson Management Consulting, an Adaptive Insights implementation partner. On August 1, 2019, Employee benefits platform Hodges-Mace was acquired by Alight Solutions. On August 22, 2019, Alight Solutions announced the acquisition of NGA Human Resources, a provider of digital human resources and global payroll services.

On July 6, 2021, they had an initial public offering (IPO) on the New York Stock Exchange. In August 2024, Dave Guilmette was hired as the new CEO of the company.

On Nov 24, 2025 it was announced that Rohit Verma would be the new CEO of Alight on January 1, 2026.

== Recognition ==
Alight was certified as a Great Place to Work in October 2018. The International Association of Outsourcing Professionals (IAOP) named Alight to The Best of the Global Outsourcing 100 in May 2019. In April 2024 Fortune magazine awarded Alight 74 of 100 companies to work for.
