= Exult Inc. =

Exult, Inc.
- Company type: Public
- Traded as: NYSE: EXLT
- Industry: Business process outsourcing
- Headquarters: Irvine, California, United States

Exult Inc. was a company headquartered in Irvine, California that provided business services related to Executive Resources (ER) and Business Process Outsourcing (BPO).

== History ==
Exult was created in 1998 and originally operated under the name of BPO US, Inc. Its business model was based on the premise that big corporations could be persuaded to outsource the most mundane human-resources tasks to outside contractors.

Founded by Jim Madden, who also served as chairman and chief executive officer of Exult. Exult was initially funded by private-equity firm General Atlantic Partners.

Exult provided administrative services like payroll and benefits plans, as well as recruiting and learning and development for businesses. The company ran some of these services on intranet technology, called myHR, in which clients' employees could access general data on human resources.

In addition to human resource functions, Exult provided financial process outsourcing solutions options to its clients inclusive of accounts receivable, general ledger and finance, accounts processing, and fixed asset and procurement tools.

== Operations ==
Exult's global footprint included operations in the United States, the United Kingdom, Canada, Hong Kong, Singapore, the Netherlands, Poland, India, and Brazil.

Client service centers for Exult were located in South Shields, England; Uberlândia, Brazil; Memphis, Tennessee; Houston, Texas; Charlotte, North Carolina; Glasgow, Scotland; Toronto, Ontario, Canada; and Mumbai, India.

Stocks in Exult traded on the NYSE under the symbol (EXLT).

== Mergers and acquisitions ==
In November 1999 Exult acquired Gunn Partners Inc., which retained its brand identity and continued to operate as Exult's consulting division. In February 2002 Answerthink, Inc. purchased the Exult Process Intelligence Center (EPIC), which was founded by Gunn Partners. EPIC then became Hackett Collaborative Learning. In 2004, Exult sold Gunn Partners to Deloitte Consulting.

In June 2003 Exult purchased the international business process outsourcing (BPO) operations of PricewaterhouseCoopers (PwC) for US$17 million, cash. The acquisition added 500 new employees, ownership of PwC's e-procurement tool, and six of PwC's contracts which included Standard Chartered Bank, Equifax in the U.K., Safeway in the U.K., Tibbet & Britten, and Grupo Algar and an airline.

In 2004, Exult announced the acquisition of ReloAction a Pleasanton, California based firm specializing in the relocation of workers for large firms.

Later in 2004, Exult itself was acquired by Hewitt Associates of Lincolnshire, Illinois in an all-stock transaction valued at US$795 million. In 2010 Aon announced the acquisition of Hewitt.
