= Veritas Capital =

American private-equity firm

Veritas Capital Fund Management, L.L.C.
- Type: Private
- Founded: 1992; 34 years ago
- Founders: Robert B. McKeon
- Headquarters: 9 West 57th Street, New York City, U.S.
- Key people: Ramzi Musallam (CEO, managing partner); Hugh Evans (managing partner); Benjamin Polk (partner)
- Services: Private equity; Private credit; Banking & Financial Services
- AUM: > US$53 billion (2026)
- Number of employees: 150+ (2026)
- Website: veritascapital.com

Veritas Capital Fund Management, L.L.C. is an American private-equity firm founded in 1992 that invests in companies providing critical products and services, primarily technology-enabled products and services, to government and commercial customers worldwide. The firm's first fund closed in 1998. They closed an eighth flagship fund in 2022; in all, Veritas has approximately $45 billion of assets under management. Veritas is led by Ramzi Musallam, the firm's Chief Executive Officer and Managing Partner.

In June 2024, Veritas Capital ranked 46th in Private Equity International's PEI 300 ranking among the world's largest private equity firms.

== History ==
Veritas Capital was founded in 1992 and raised its first fund in 1998. The firm invested exclusively in companies that support governments, government-influenced markets, and commercial customers, specifically in certain sectors, such as aerospace, defense, communications, education, energy, government services, healthcare, national security, and software. Since 1998, it has raised seven funds with a total value of over $14 billion. During this time, it originated and managed over 90 acquisitions.

== Military and Defense ==
Veritas made a major play in national security with the acquisition of Raytheon Aerospace in June 2001 and Flight International in December 2002. It merged the two companies to form Vertex Aerospace LLC, and sold Vertex to L3 Technologies in October 2003.

Veritas acquired several units of DynCorp from CSC in 2004 to create DynCorp International LLC. It launched an IPO on the New York Stock Exchange in 2006, offering 25 million shares and retaining shareholder control. The firm sold DynCorp International to Cerberus Capital Management in 2010.

In 2005 it acquired MZM Corporation and changed MZM's name to Athena Innovative Solutions before selling it to CACI in 2007.

Veritas acquired the Enterprise Integration Group business unit of Lockheed Martin in 2010 and changed its name to the SI Organization. SI acquired PhaseOne Communications in 2012, Applied Communication Sciences in 2013 and QinetiQ North America's services business in 2014, after which it rebranded itself Vencore.

In 2017, Veritas acquired the government IT services division of Harris Corporation, and renamed it as Peraton. Peraton primarily contracts with the US and Canadian military.

In 2021, Veritas acquired the federal IT and mission support business of Northrop Grumman for $3.4 billion in cash. Veritas placed this purchase in its Peraton subsidiary.

In May 2021, Perspecta was acquired by Veritas for $7.1 billion and also placed under Peraton.

In September 2021, Peraton's Systems Engineering Sector (SES) was divested from Peraton to the Veritas's Vantage fund under the name Arcfield.

== Integrated Information Technology ==
By 2019 Veritas' portfolio included Abaco Systems, Inc., Alion Science and Technology Corporation, APTIM Corp., athenahealth, Inc., Cambium Learning Group, Inc., Cotiviti, Inc., Guidehouse, and OnSolve, LLC.

On or about May 25, 2021, Cubic Corporation (NYSE: CUB) announced the completion of its sale to Veritas Capital and Evergreen Coast Capital Corporation in a transaction valued at approximately $3.0 billion, including the assumption of debt.

In February 2023, Veritas Capital completed the acquisition of industry leader Wood Mackenzie, who has provided high-quality data, analytics, and insights used to power the energy, renewable and natural resource industries.

On August 6, 2024, NCR Voyix publicly announced that it had reached an agreement with Veritas Capital to sell Digital banking sector of NCR Voyix for $2.45 billion. The transaction was completed on September 30; the resulting company was named Candescent.

== Healthcare technology ==
In 2012, Veritas acquired the "health-care data business" of Thomson Reuters for $1.25 billion; the business is now called Truven Health Analytics. In 2016, it sold Truven Health Analytics Inc. to IBM for $2.6 billion.

On April 25, 2016, the firm acquired the healthcare services business unit from Verisk Analytics, Inc. for $820 million. The deal closed on June 1, 2016, and the company was renamed “Verscend Technologies, Inc.”

On April 2, 2018, the firm announced plans to buy The Value-Based Care Solutions Group from GE Healthcare for $1.05 billion. The deal closed on July 11, 2018. On October 9, 2018, it announced it was rebranding The Value-Based Care Solutions Group to Virence Health Technologies.

On June 19, 2018, Veritas-backed Verscend acquired Cotiviti Holdings, Inc., a provider of payment accuracy and analytics-driven solutions focused primarily on the healthcare industry, for $4.9 billion. The deal closed on August 27, 2018; the combined private company would operate under the Cotiviti name.

On November 12, 2018, the firm announced it had entered into a definitive agreement to acquire Watertown, Massachusetts–based athenahealth for $5.7 billion through a partnership with Evergreen Coast Capital, with plans to merge athenahealth with Virence Health Technologies; the joint company would operate under the athenahealth brand. The acquisition closed on February 11, 2019. In June 2019, the firm received “PE Deal of the Year” for its acquisition of athenahealth by the publication The Deal.

On March 10, 2020, DXC Technology announced it had reached an agreement with Veritas to purchase its U.S. State and Local Health and Human Services business for $5.0 billion. On October 1, 2020, DXC also sold its U.S. State and Local Health and Human Services business to Veritas Capital, forming Gainwell Technologies, supporting clients across U.S. states and territories in Medicaid Management Information Systems (MMIS), healthcare management, and immunization registry and eligibility services.

== Publishing ==
On February 22, 2022, a tender offer was announced by Veritas to acquire the publisher Houghton Mifflin Harcourt for $21 per share, or about $2.8 billion. The tender deadline was originally April 1, before being extended to April 6 on March 29. Before the tender date, there were over 36,000 contracts traded for the June 17 $22.5 strike price call options. Many investors purchased call options based on numerous reports from institutional investors with large stakes in the company, claiming that the $21 per share offer was undervaluing the company. On April 6, 57% of $HMHC shares were put up for tender, leading to the tender offer going through and HMH going private. Once the sale was completed, the stock of Houghton Mifflin Harcourt was delisted from Nasdaq.
