= DXC Technology =

American multinational IT services company

DXC Technology Company
- Type: Public
- Traded as: NYSE: DXC; S&P 600 component; Russell 2000 component
- Industry: Information technology consulting; Outsourcing
- Predecessors: Computer Sciences Corporation; Hewlett Packard Enterprise; Electronic Data Systems
- Founded: April 3, 2017; 9 years ago
- Headquarters: Ashburn, Virginia, U.S.
- Area served: Worldwide
- Key people: Raul Fernandez (CEO)
- Revenue: ▼US$13.7 billion (2024)
- Operating income: ▲US$332 million (2024)
- Net income: ▲US$91 million (2024)
- Total assets: ▼US$13.9 billion (2024)
- Total equity: ▼US$2.81 billion (2024)
- Number of employees: 125,000 (2024)
- Subsidiaries: Molina Medicaid Solutions; Luxoft
- Website: dxc.com
- Footnotes; Financials as of March 31, 2024.

DXC Technology Company is an American multinational information technology (IT) services and consulting company headquartered in Ashburn, Virginia.

== History ==
DXC Technology was founded on April 3, 2017, through a merger between Hewlett Packard Enterprise’s Enterprise Services business unit and Computer Sciences Corporation. The company provides business-to-business Information Technology (IT) services. It began trading on the New York Stock Exchange under the symbol DXC. At the time of its creation, DXC Technology had revenues of $25 billion, with 6,000 enterprise and public sector clients across 70 countries, and employing around 170,000 staff.

In July 2017, the company started a three-year plan to reduce the number of offices in India from 50 to 26, and reduce headcount by approximately 10,000 employees (5.9%).

The next year, DXC split off its US public sector segment to create a new company, Perspecta Inc.

In June 2019, with about 43,000 employees in India and one of its largest delivery engines for application outsourcing and software development, the company restructured its workforce to meet its new revenue profile.

Mike Salvino, the former Accenture chief group executive, was named president and CEO of DXC Technology in September 2019.

In October 2020, DXC sold its U.S. State and Local Health and Human Services business to Veritas Capital, forming Gainwell Technologies.

In February 2021, French technology services and consulting firm Atos ended talks for a potential acquisition of DXC. Atos had proposed a takeover deal valued at US$10 billion, including debt.

As of November 2021, DXC had around 130,000 employees in over 70 countries in its global innovation and delivery centres; the largest among them is India, followed by the Philippines, Central Europe, and Vietnam.

In May 2022, Salvino was appointed as the chairman of DXC's board, taking over Ian Read following his retirement in July 2022.

In October 2023, DXC was delisted from S&P 500 Index, and moved to the S&P SmallCap 600 Index.

In December 2023, DXC Technology announced that Mike Salvino was stepping down as CEO, effective immediately. Raul Fernandez, who was on the board of directors, was appointed as the president and chief executive officer of DXC Technology in February 2024.

As of November 2024, DXC employed over 125,000 in over 70 countries, including 7 cities in India.

=== Acquisitions ===
In July 2017, DXC purchased enterprise software company Tribridge and its affiliate company Concerto Cloud Services for $152 million.

The next year, the company announced additional acquisitions, including Molina Medicaid Solutions (previously part of Molina Healthcare), Argodesign and two ServiceNow partners, BusinessNow and TESM.

In January 2019, DXC Technology acquired Luxoft. The deal closed that June.

== Programs and sponsorships ==
=== Dandelion Program ===
Piloted in Adelaide, South Australia, in 2014, the DXC Dandelion Program has grown to over 100 employees in Australia, working with more than 240 organizations in 71 countries to acquire sustainable employment for individuals with autism. In June 2021, DXC piloted the Dandelion Program in the UK.

=== Sports ===
The company sponsored Team Penske with 2016 Series Champion and 2019 Indianapolis 500 winner Simon Pagenaud, and in 2018, became title sponsor of IndyCar Series race DXC Technology 600. DXC is also a partner of Australian Rugby Union team Brumbies. In 2022, the company became the new sleeve sponsor for English football club Manchester United. In May 2023, the company signed a multi-year partnership with Scuderia Ferrari starting from the 2023 Miami Grand Prix onwards.

== See also ==
- List of IT consulting firms
