= Perspecta Inc. =

American technology company

- Industry: Cybersecurity; Defense; Government Services
- Founded: 2018
- Defunct: 2021
- Successor: Peraton
- Key people: Mac Curtis (President and CEO); John Kavanaugh (CFO); Tammy Heller (CHR)
- Revenue: $4.5 billion (2020)
- Website: perspecta.com

Perspecta Inc. was an American government services company based in Chantilly, Virginia. The company was acquired by Peraton in 2021.

== History ==
Perspecta was formed in 2018 from the merger of DXC Technology's U.S. Public Sector spin-off with Vencore, Inc. and KeyPoint Government Solutions. In June Veritas Capital became an investor in the company, acquiring a stake of 14.5%.

In 2019, the company acquired Knight Point Systems for $250 million. In the same year, Perspecta won an $824 million contract with the National Geospatial Intelligence Agency and a $657 million extension on its IT services contract for the Navy.

In February 2021, Perspecta announced that the company has received a potential five-year, $38 million contract award to continue supporting the Defense Manpower Data Center (DMDC) with a mission-critical program for contractor management for the Department of Defense (DOD). The company will also work to inform DOD decision makers about the status of personnel, training and security related to humanitarian and peacekeeping missions. Perspecta is planning to provide cloud migration, software development, quality assurance, 24/7 help desk support and training. In the same year the company signed a contract with the U.S. Department of Defense, valued at $437 million.

In May 2021, shareholders of Perspecta voted to adopt a merger agreement, receiving $29.35 per share. The company was acquired by Peraton, owned by Veritas Capital, for a total of $7.1 billion.

== Corporate affairs ==
At the time of the company merger, Perspecta employed approximately 14,000 people and generated annual revenues of USD4.5 billion (2020). The company was led by CEO and President Mac Curtis, who didn't transfer to Peraton after the sale.
